= Timeline of Buenos Aires =

This is a timeline of the history of the city of Buenos Aires, Argentina.

== Prior to 19th century ==
- 1536 – First foundation of the city by Pedro de Mendoza.
- 1542 – City attacked by indigenous people and settlers abandon it, moving to Asunción.
- 1580 – Second foundation of the city around fort built by Juan de Garay.
- 1591 – Dominican monastery established.
- 1604 – San Francisco monastery established.
- 1611 – Men's Hospital founded.
- 1620 – Town becomes capital of Buenos Aires Province.
- 1671 – Cathedral inaugurated.
- 1711 – Cabildo built.
- 1716 – Granted the royal motto Most Noble and Loyal ("Muy Noble y muy Leal")
- 1720 – Recoleta church built.
- 1722 – Completion of Saint Ignatius Church
- 1727 – San Miguel church founded.
- 1743 – Women's Hospital established.
- 1744 – Las Monjas convent founded.
- 1749 – San Juan convent established.
- 1752 – Cathedral built.
- 1755 – Female Orphan School established.
- 1763 – Anglo-Portuguese invasion, part of the Seven Years' War, repelled by Viceroy Cevallos.
- 1768 – Merced church built.
- 1776 – City becomes capital of Viceroyalty of the Río de la Plata.
- 1778 – "Free trade regulations" in effect.
- 1779 – Foundling Asylum established.
- 1794 – Consulado (merchant guild) established.

== 19th century ==
=== 1800s-1840s ===
- 1801 - Telégrafo Mercantil newspaper begins publication.
- 1806 - British briefly in power.
- 1810
  - 18–25 May: May Revolution.
  - State Library established.
- 1811 – Pirámide de Mayo monument built on the Plaza de Mayo.
- 1815 – Academy of Jurisprudence founded.
- 1821 – University of Buenos Aires founded.
- 1822
  - Academy of Music founded.
  - Street names changed.
  - Northern Cemetery established.
- 1823 – Museum of Buenos Ayres, Sociedad de Beneficencia, and Philharmonic Association founded.
- 1829 – British Library established (approximate date).
- 1832 – English Cemetery established.
- 1833 – Victoria Theatre built.
- 1838
  - 28 March: French blockade of the Río de la Plata begins.
  - Scotch Church built.
- 1840 – French blockade of the Río de la Plata ends.
- 1841 – Foreign Club established.
- 1845 – Anglo-French blockade of the Río de la Plata begins.
- 1847 – Lutheran Church built.

=== 1850s–1890s ===
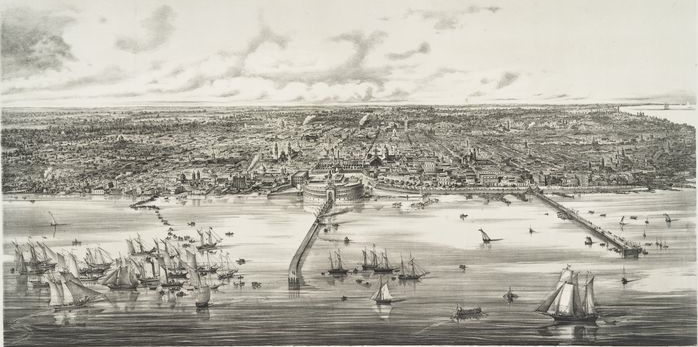
Buenos Aires, ca.1860

- 1850 – Anglo-French blockade of the Río de la Plata ends.
- 1852
  - Board of Health, Faculty of Medicine, and Club del Progreso founded.
  - Yellow fever epidemic.
- 1853
  - City becomes capital of State of Buenos Aires.
  - Germania club founded.
- 1854 – Buenos Aires Stock Exchange, Society of Natural History of the Plate, and Gymnastic Club founded.
- 1855 – Custom house built.
- 1856
  - Mercado del Plata built.
  - Irish Convent of Sisters of Mercy established.
- 1857
  - Teatro Colón opens.
  - Deaf and Dumb Institute founded.
  - Buenos Aires Western Railway inaugurated.
- 1858
  - Café Tortoni in business.
  - Poor Asylum, School of Catedral al Sur, and Maua Bank established.
  - School of medicine built.
  - Yellow fever epidemic.
- 1859 – British Hospital and Convalecencia built.
- 1860
  - Plaza del Retiro laid out.
  - Catedral al Norte (school) and Club del Plata founded.
  - Santa Catalina church built.
- 1861
  - City becomes part of Argentine Confederation again.
  - Plaza del Parque public garden laid out.
  - Teutonia club founded.
  - Mercado del Comercio and Episcopal palace built.
- 1862
  - Buenos Aires Great Southern Railway opened.
  - Plaza Libertad laid out.
  - Archbishop's Palace built.
  - French Hospital and Irish Hospital established.
- 1863
  - Congress-hall and Italian Hospital built.
  - London and River Plate Bank established.
  - Tram service starts.
- 1864
  - Franco Argentine Theatre in business.
  - Lorea market, German Singing Academy, and Concordia club established.
  - Buenos Aires Cricket & Rugby Club opened.
- 1865
  - Constitución railway station opens.
  - Coliseum concert-hall built.
  - Kranken-verein and Heimath club founded.
- 1866 – Archepiscopal see and Mercado de Independencia established.
- 1867
  - Cholera epidemic.
  - German Hospital Society, Mercado del Norte, and Thalia club founded.
- 1868
  - Congregación Israelita Argentina founded.
  - Sanitary Institute opens.
- 1869
  - La Prensa newspaper begins publication.
  - Population: 177,767.
- 1870 – Yellow fever epidemic.
- 1871
  - Yellow fever epidemic.
  - City fire department established.
- 1873 – A la Ciudad de Londres department store in business.
- 1875 – Parque Tres de Febrero inaugurated.
- 1876 – Sociedad Estímulo de Bellas Artes (art society) and Buenos Aires Orchestral Society organized.
- 1877
  - National Penitentiary inaugurated.
  - Café de Hansen in business.
- 1879
  - Teatro Politeama (Buenos Aires) (theatre) opens.
  - Rivadavia Library founded.
- 1880 - City separated from Buenos Aires Province; Municipalidad de la Ciudad de Buenos Aires established.
- 1882
  - Once railway station opens.
  - National Theatre built.
  - South American Continental Exhibition held.
- 1887
  - Belgrano and Flores become part of city.
  - Constitución railway station rebuilt.
- 1888
  - By Law 2089, the national government of Argentina expanded the City of Buenos Aires by annexing the towns of Belgrano, Flores, and parts of General San Martín Partido, such as today's Villa Devoto.
  - Buenos Aires Zoo established.
  - Pizzurno Palace built.
- 1890 - National Historical Museum opens.
- 1891 – Rivera Indarte Theatre opens.
- 1893 – Buenos Aires City Hall built.
- 1894
  - Palacio de Aguas Corrientes built.
  - Musical Mutual Society organized.
- 1895
  - Museo Nacional de Bellas Artes opens.
  - Population: 663,854.
- 1897 – Puerto Madero constructed.
- 1898
  - Buenos Aires Botanical Garden inaugurated.
  - Casa Rosada re-built.

== 20th century ==
=== 1900s–1940s ===
- 1901 – Club Atlético River Plate formed.
- 1904
  - Monument to Giuseppe Garibaldi inaugurated.
  - Population: 950,891.
- 1905
  - Club Atlético Boca Juniors formed.
  - Population: 1,025,653.
- 1906 – Congress hall built.
- 1908 – Avenida Theatre opens.
- 1909 – San Martín Palace built.
- 1910
  - Exposición Internacional del Centenario held.
  - Customs House, Palace of Justice, and Congressional Plaza inaugurated.
- 1911 – Hotel de Inmigrantes built.
- 1912 – Cine Atlas Belgrano opens.
- 1913
  - Buenos Aires Underground begins operating.
  - Diario Crítica newspaper begins publication.
- 1914
  - Harrods Buenos Aires in business.
  - Population: 1,575,814.
- 1915 – Retiro railway station opens.
- 1916 – Buenos Aires Stock Exchange built.
- 1917 – Confitería El Molino in business.
- 1919
  - January: Tragic Week conflict.
  - Teatro Gran Splendid opens.
- 1921 – Cervantes Theatre opens.
- 1922 – Cine Catalunya opens.
- 1923 – Palacio Barolo built.
- 1925 – Puerto Nuevo opens.
- 1936
  - Kavanagh Building constructed.
  - Maldonado Stream tubed (approximate date).
  - Obelisco built.
- 1937 – Teatro Gran Rex opens.
- 1938 – Estadio Monumental opens.
- 1945 – 17 October: Labor demonstration.
- 1946 – Buenos Aires Philharmonic founded.
- 1947 – Population: 2,981,043 city; 4,603,035 urban agglomeration.
- 1948
  - Aeroparque Jorge Newbery opens.
  - Buenos Aires Great Southern Railway & Buenos Aires Western Railway closed.
- 1949 – Ministro Pistarini International Airport built.

=== 1950s–1990s ===
- 1950 – Alas Building constructed.
- 1955
  - 16 June: Bombing of Plaza de Mayo.
  - Revolución Libertadora.
- 1957 – Federico Lacroze railway station opens.
- 1958 – Justo José de Urquiza monument inaugurated.
- 1962 – 11 June: Villa Soldati level crossing train accident.
- 1967 – Buenos Aires Japanese Gardens open.
- 1968 – Galileo Galilei planetarium opens.
- 1971 – Florida Street pedestrianized.
- 1972 – Bombing of Sheraton Hotel.
- 1973 – 20 June: Peronist shooting near Ezeiza Airport.
- 1974 – Population: 2,976,000 city; 8,925,000 urban agglomeration.
- 1975
  - Buenos Aires International Book Fair begins.
  - Bombing of theatre.
- 1976
  - 24 March: Coup d'état.
  - 2 April: Osvaldo Cacciatore becomes mayor.
- 1977 – 30 April: Demonstrations by Mothers of the Plaza de Mayo begin.
- 1978 – Argentine Council for International Relations founded.
- 1979
  - 11 December: 1979 Copa América football tournament held.
  - Caseros Prison built.
- 1980 – Centro Cultural Recoleta inaugurated.
- 1982 – June: Catholic Pope John Paul II visits city.
- 1987
  - April: Catholic Pope John Paul II visits city.
  - 12 July: 1987 Copa América Final football tournament held.
- 1988 – Patio Bullrich shopping centre opens.
- 1991
  - Galerías Pacífico shopping centre opens.
  - Population: 2,960,976 city; 10,686,163 urban agglomeration.
- 1992
  - 17 March: Bombing of Israeli embassy.
  - National Library building inaugurated.
- 1994 – 18 July: Bombing of Argentine Israelite Mutual Association building.
- 1996
  - Autonomous City of Buenos Aires established per 1994 amendment of the Argentine Constitution.
  - 30 June: Mayoral election takes place.
- 1999
  - Buenos Aires International Festival of Independent Cinema begins.
  - Abasto de Buenos Aires shopping mall opens.
- 2000
  - King Fahd Islamic Cultural Center inaugurated.
  - El Ateneo Grand Splendid bookshop in business.
  - Aníbal Ibarra becomes Chief of Government of city.

== 21st century ==
=== 2000s ===
- 2001
  - September: Latin American Art Museum of Buenos Aires inaugurated.
  - BAFWEEK and Creamfields BA music festival begin.
  - Eloísa Cartonera founded.
  - December: Economic protest.
- 2002
  - June: Economic protest.
  - Quilmes Rock music festival and Buenos Aires Jazz Festival begin.
- 2004 – 30 December: Cromañón nightclub fire.
- 2005
  - Appetite (art gallery) opens.
  - El Faro Towers built.
- 2006 – March: Aníbal Ibarra deposed; Jorge Telerman becomes Chief of Government of city.
- 2007 – December: Mauricio Macri becomes Chief of Government of city.
- 2008
  - September: Repsol-YPF Tower built.
  - October: Fortabat Art Collection opens.
- 2009
  - Le Parc Figueroa Alcorta and Mulieris Towers built.
  - Metropolitan Police department established.

=== 2010s ===
- 2010
  - Municipal bicycle-sharing system established.
  - Population: 2,891,082.
- 2011
  - 24 July: 2011 Copa América final football tournament held.
  - 31 May: Metrobus begins operating.
  - City named World Book Capital by UNESCO.
- 2012
  - 22 February: Train crash.
  - 4 April: F2 2012 Buenos Aires tornado
- 2013
  - March: Jorge Mario Bergoglio, Cardinal, Archbishop of Buenos Aires, is elected as Pope Francis, succeeding the retired Pope Benedict XVI
  - April: Flooding.
  - Computer Museum of Argentina opens.
- 2015 – 3 June: The feminist movement Ni una menos organizes its first massive demonstrations against gender-based violence, popularising the campaign throughout Argentina and several Latin American countries.
- 2016 – Population: 13,879,707 (urban agglomeration).
- 2017 – Alvear Tower completed as the tallest building in Argentina.
- 2018 – 2018 Summer Youth Olympics held.

=== 2020s ===
- 2020 – March: First COVID-19 case.
- 2022 – Population: 16,700,000 (metro).
- 2023 – A specialized exhibition recognised by the Bureau International des Expositions will be held.

== See also ==
- Buenos Aires history
- History of Buenos Aires
- Barrios and Communes of Buenos Aires
- List of mayors and chiefs of government of Buenos Aires
- Landmarks in Buenos Aires
- Timeline of Argentine history

== Bibliography ==
=== Published in the 18th–19th centuries ===
- Jedidiah Morse (1797), "Buenos Ayres", The American Gazetteer, Boston: S. Hall, and Thomas & Andrews
- Emeric Essex Vidal (1820), Picturesque illustrations of Buenos Ayres and Monte Video, London: R. Ackermann, OCLC 6287966, OL 6939031M
- Josiah Conder (1830), "Buenos Ayres", The Modern Traveller, London: J.Duncan
- David Brewster, ed. (1830). "Buenos Ayres". Edinburgh Encyclopædia. Edinburgh: William Blackwood.
- Michael George Mulhall; E.T. Mulhall (1869), "City of Buenos Ayres (etc.)", Handbook of the River Plate, Buenos Ayres: Standard Printing Office
- Ernst Nolte (1882). The Stranger's Guide for Buenos Aires. Buenos Aires: German Library.
- Archibald Wilberforce, ed. (1893). "Buenos Ayres". Capitals of the Globe. NY: Peter Fenelon Collier. hdl:2027/mdp.39015061863513.

=== Published in the 20th century ===
- Manuel Bilbao (1902), Buenos Aires (in Spanish), Buenos Aires: J.A. Alsina, OL 24423913M
- Statistical Annuary of the City of Buenos Aires. Buenos Aires: Compania Sud-Americana de Billetes de Banco. 1907.
- Arthur Ruhl (1908). "City of Good Airs". Scribner's Magazine. NY: 105 v. hdl:2027/mdp.39076001655666.
- Mitchell's Standard Guide to Buenos Aires, Buenos Aires: Mitchell's Book Store, 1909, OL 7167609M
- Lamoureux, Andrew Jackson (1910). "Buenos Aires (city)" . Encyclopædia Britannica. Vol. 4 (11th ed.). pp. 752–754.
- A. Stuart Pennington (1910), "The Capital", The Argentine Republic, London: Stanley Paul & Co.
- Charles Warren Currier (1911), "(Buenos Aires)", Lands of the Southern Cross: a Visit to South America, Washington, DC: Spanish-American Publication Society
- United States Bureau of Foreign and Domestic Commerce (1914), "Buenos Aires", Trade Directory of South America for the Promotion of American Export Trade, Washington DC: Government Printing Office, OCLC 5821807
- Henry Stephens (1915), "Buenos Aires", South American Travels, New York: Knickerbocker Press, OCLC 6588111
- Annie Smith Peck (1916), "(Buenos Aires)", The South American Tour, New York: G.H. Doran, OCLC 4541554
- Gordon Ross (1917), "Mondevideo and Buenos Aires", Argentina and Uruguay, London: Methuen
- Ernst B. Filsinger (1922), "Buenos Aires", Commercial Travelers' Guide to Latin America, Washington, DC: Govt. Print. Office
- W. A. Robson, ed. (1954). "Buenos Aires". Great Cities of the World: their Government, Politics and Planning. Routledge. ISBN 978-1-135-67247-8.
- J. R. Scobie. (1972) "Buenos Aires as a commercial-bureaucratic city, 1880-1919: characteristics of a city's orientation." Amer. Historical Rev. 77, 4: 1035–1073.
- Alonso, Paula. 1993. "Politics and Elections in Buenos Aires, 1890–1898: The Performance of the Radical Party." Journal of Latin American Studies 25 (3): 465–487.
- Jose Moya. Cousins and Strangers: Spanish Immigrants in Buenos Aires, 1850–1930. Berkeley: University of California Press, 1998

=== Published in the 21st century ===
- Matthew B. Karush (2003). "National Identity in the Sports Pages: Football and the Mass Media in 1920s Buenos Aires". The Americas. 60 (1): 11–32. doi:10.1353/tam.2003.0073. JSTOR 3654752. S2CID 144462904.
- Donna J. Guy (2004). "Women's Organizations and Jewish Orphanages in Buenos Aires, 1918-1955". Jewish History. 18 (1): 75–93. doi:10.1023/B:JEHI.0000005737.07142.ab. JSTOR 20100924. S2CID 159828141.
- Subverting the spaces of invitation? Local politics and participatory budgeting in post-crisis Buenos Aires, London: Crisis States Research Centre, 2005 – via International Relations and Security Network
- David Marley (2005), "Buenos Aires", Historic Cities of the Americas, Santa Barbara, California: ABC-CLIO, p. 651+, ISBN 1-57607-027-1
- Lyman L. Johnson; Zephyr Frank (2006). "Cities and Wealth in the South Atlantic: Buenos Aires and Rio de Janeiro before 1860". Comparative Studies in Society and History. 48 (3): 634–668. doi:10.1017/s0010417506000259. JSTOR 3879439. S2CID 144781582.
- Craig Epplin (2007). "New Media, Cardboard, and Community in Contemporary Buenos Aires". Hispanic Review. 75 (4): 385–398. doi:10.1353/hir.2007.0033. JSTOR 27668813. S2CID 162202775.
- Filipe Campante; Edward Glaeser (2009), Yet Another Tale of Two Cities: Buenos Aires and Chicago, Cambridge, Massachusetts: National Bureau of Economic Research
- Viviana L. Grieco (2009). "Socializing the King's Debt: Local and Atlantic Financial Transactions of the Merchants of Buenos Aires, 1793–1808". The Americas. 65 (3): 321–350. doi:10.1353/tam.0.0100. JSTOR 25488140. S2CID 153346955.
- Susan Hallstead-Dabove (2009). "Disease and immorality: the problem of fashionable dress in Buenos Aires, 1862-1990". Latin American Literary Review. 37 (73): 90–117. JSTOR 41478056.
- Diego Armus (2011), The Ailing City: Health, Tuberculosis, and Culture in Buenos Aires, 1870–1950, Durham, North Carolina: Duke University Press, ISBN 978-0-8223-4999-0
- Kristen McCleary (2012). "Inflaming the Fears of Theatergoers: How Fires Shaped the Public Sphere in Buenos Aires, Argentina, 1880-1910". In Greg Bankoff; et al. (eds.). Flammable Cities: Urban Conflagration and the Making of the Modern World. USA: University of Wisconsin Press. pp. 254–272. ISBN 978-0-299-28383-4.
