= List of tallest buildings in Buenos Aires =

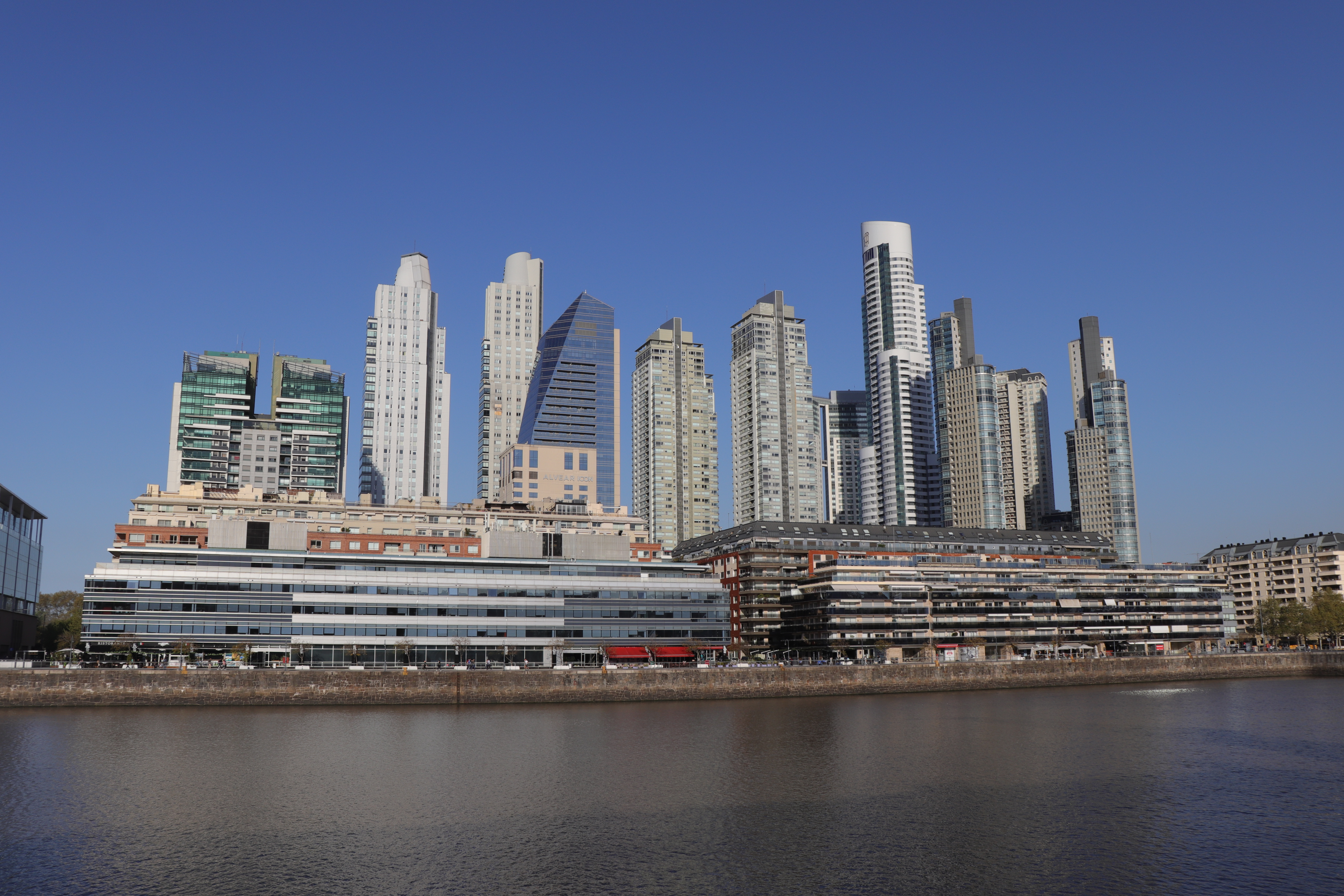
Puerto Madero skyline

This list ranks high-rises in the Argentine capital of Buenos Aires. The tallest structure in the city is the Alvear Tower, which rises 239 metres (784 ft) and was completed in 2017.

Most of the city's skyscrapers are located in the Puerto Madero barrio, one of the city wards that make up Buenos Aires' microcentro. Recent years have seen an increase in high-rises in the city; the tallest building completed before 2000 is the Le Parc Tower, the ninth-tallest as of 2023.

== Tallest buildings ==
| Rank | Name | Image | Height (m) | Floors | Year | Notes |
|---|---|---|---|---|---|---|
| 1 | Alvear Tower | | 235 | 54 | 2017 | |
| 2 | Harbour Tower | | 192 | 53 | 2026 | |
| 3 | Torre Cavia | | 172.8 | 48 | 2009 | |
| 4 | Renoir II | | 171 | 52 | 2015 | |
| 5 | Mulieris Tower I | | 161.3 | 44 | 2009 | Tallest building in Buenos Aires from 2008 until 2009, along with the South Tower. |
| 6 | Mulieris Tower II | | 161.3 | 44 | 2009 | |
| 7 | El Faro I | | 160 | 46 | 2003 | Tallest building in Buenos Aires from 2002 until 2008, along with El Faro II. |
| 8 | El Faro II | | 160 | 46 | 2005 | |
| 9 | Repsol-YPF Tower | | 160 | 36 | 2007 | Tallest building in Buenos Aires from 2007 until 2008, along with El Faro I and El Faro II. |
| 10 | Le Parc Tower | | 158 | 51 | 1995 | Tallest building in Buenos Aires from 1993 until 2002. |
| 11 | Château Puerto Madero | | 156 | 48 | 2009 | |
| 12 | BBVA Tower | | 155 | 33 | 2016 | |
| 13 | Galicia Central Tower | | 145 | 33 | 2005 | |
| 14 | Bellini Tower | | 145 | 37 | 2008 | |
| 15 | Le Parc Puerto Madero Towers | | 144 | 43 | 2007 | |
| 16 | Mirabilia Towers | | 142 | 45 | 2007 | |
| 17 | Libertador 4444 | | 142 | 46 | 1993 | |
| 18 | Alas Building | | 141 | 41 | 1950 | Tallest building in Buenos Aires from 1955 until 1993. |
| 19 | Bulnes Tower | | 140 | 37 | 1999 | |
| 20 | Ruggieri Tower | | 140 | 37 | 1999 | |
| 21 | BankBoston Tower | | 140 | 33 | 2001 | |
| 22 | Renoir I | | 135.4 | 41 | 2008 | |
| 23 | Torres del Yacht | | 135 | 45 | 2014 | |
| 24 | Promenade Palermo | | 135 | 33 | 2007 | |
| 25 | Palermo One | | 135 | 34 | 2007 | |
| 26 | Château Libertador Residence | | 133 | 40 | 2008 | |
| 27 | Madero Office Tower | | 130.5 | 31 | 2011 | |
| 28 | Alvear Icon Hotel | | 130 | 32 | 2017 | Tallest hotel in Buenos Aires. |
| 29 | Torre Banco Macro | | 130 | 30 | 2017 | |
| 30 | Mirabilia Towers | | 129 | 45 | 2007 | |
| 31 | 200 Della Paolera | | 125 | 33 | 2020 | |
| 32 | Torre Alem Plaza | | 121 | 32 | 1996 | |
| 33 | Kavanagh Building | | 120 | 30 | 1936 | |
| 34 | Torre Alcorta | | 120 | 29 | 2009 | |
| 35 | Bulnes Tower | | 118.8 | 37 | 1997 | |
| 36 | Ruggieri Tower | | 118.8 | 37 | 2000 | |

== See also ==
- List of tallest buildings in Argentina
