= List of tallest buildings in Argentina =

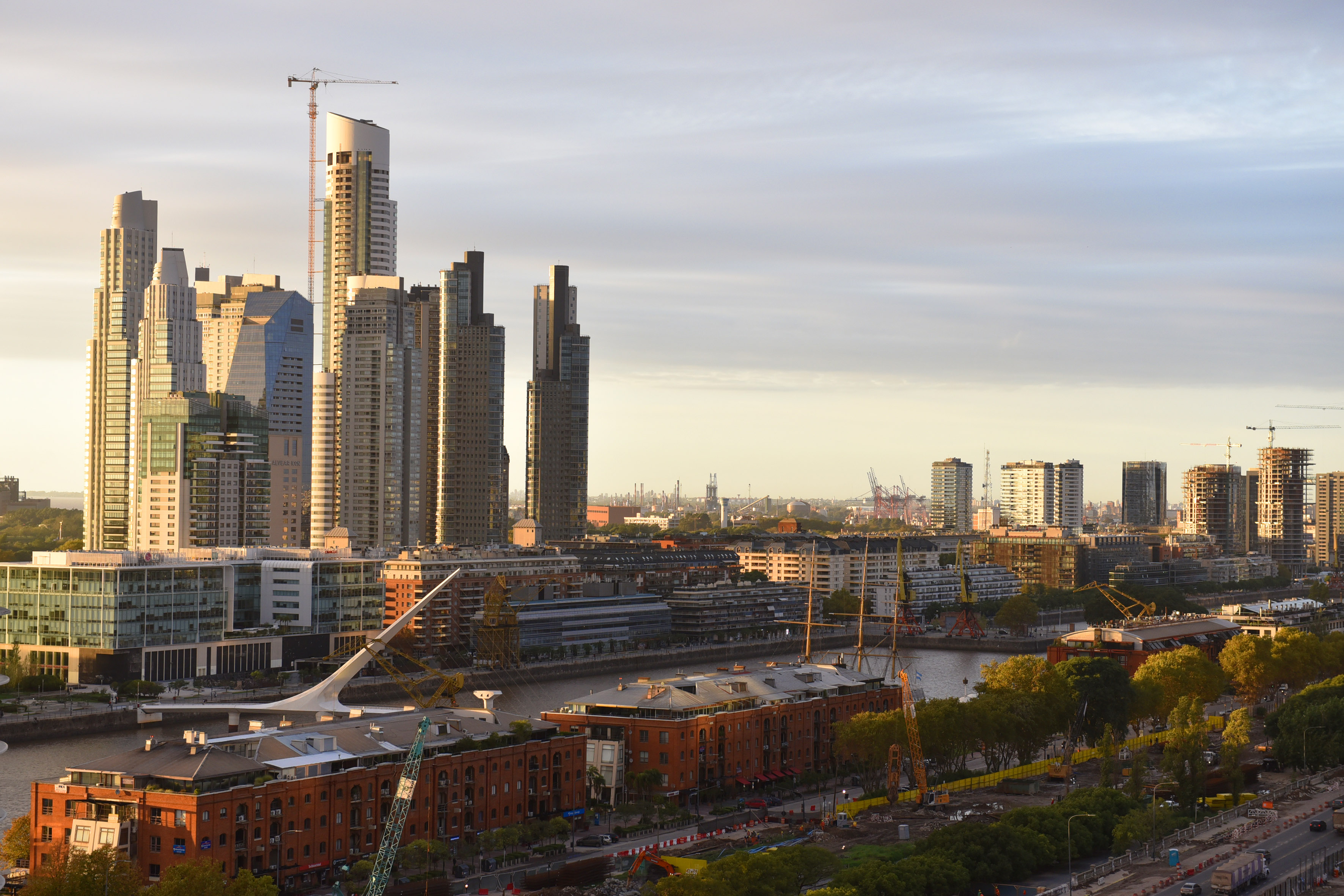
Puerto Madero skyline, Buenos Aires

The tallest buildings in Argentina are primarily residential and most of them were completed after 2000, with some notable exceptions being the Kavanagh Building, an Art Deco skyscraper completed in 1936, and the Alas Building, commissioned by President Juan Perón in 1950 and completed in the late 1950s.

Almost all of the country's high-rise buildings are located in Buenos Aires, the Argentine capital city and a major metropolitan area in South America. Within Buenos Aires, the Dock 3 of Puerto Madero has been the site for most of Argentina's tallest skyscrapers. Tall buildings have also emerged at the Dock 1, where the 192-metre (649 ft) tall Harbour Tower is currently under construction, set to be completed in 2024 as the second tallest building in Argentina.

== Completed ==
This list ranks completed buildings in Argentina that stand at least 120 metres (394 ft) tall, based on standard height measurement. This includes spires and architectural details but does not include antenna masts. An equal sign (=) following a rank indicates the same height between two or more buildings. The "Year" column indicates the year in which a building was completed.

Was the tallest building in Argentina upon completion

Rank	Name	Image	Location	Height m (ft)	Floors	Year	Notes
1	Alvear Tower		Buenos Aires; 34°36′44.5″S 58°21′37.2″W	235 (770)	54	2017	
2	Torre Cavia		Buenos Aires; 34°34′32.6″S 58°24′18″W	172 (567)	44	2009	
3	Renoir II		Buenos Aires; 34°36′36″S 58°21′42.6″W	171 (562)	52	2015	
4=	Mulieris Towers, North Tower		Buenos Aires; 34°36′46″S 58°21′40″W	161 (530)	45	2009	Tallest building in Buenos Aires and Argentina from 2008 until 2009, along with the South Tower.
4=	Mulieris Towers, South Tower		Buenos Aires; 34°36′46″S 58°21′40″W	161 (530)	45	2009	
6=	El Faro I		Buenos Aires; 34°34′47″S 58°21′40.1″W	160 (525)	46	2003	Tallest building in Buenos Aires and Argentina from 2002 until 2008, along with El Faro II.
6=	El Faro II		Buenos Aires; 34°34′47″S 58°21′40.1″W	160 (525)	46	2005	
6=	YPF Tower		Buenos Aires; 34°36′20″S 58°21′45″W	160 (525)	36	2008	Tallest building in Buenos Aires and Argentina from 2007 until 2008, along with El Faro I and El Faro II.
9	Le Parc Tower		Buenos Aires; 34°34′30.6″S 58°25′17.2″W	158 (518)	51	1994	Tallest building in Buenos Aires and Argentina from 1993 until 2002.
10	Château Puerto Madero		Buenos Aires; 34°36′46.7″S 58°21′36.5″W	156 (511)	50	2010	
11	BBVA Tower		Buenos Aires; 34°35′52.45″S 58°22′12.48″W	155 (508)	33	2016	
12	Galicia Central Tower		Buenos Aires; 34°36′20.5″S 58°22′21.5″W	145 (476)	33	2007	
13=	Torre del Río		Buenos Aires; 34°36′40.7″S 58°21′37.7″W	144 (471)	43	2005	
13=	Torre del Parque		Buenos Aires; 34°36′40″S 58°21′39.6″W	144 (471)	43	2006	
13=	Torre del Boulevard		Buenos Aires; 34°36′41″S 58°21′41.4″W	144 (471)	43	2007	
16	Mirabilia Palermo II		Buenos Aires; 34°34′56.5″S 58°25′54.7″W	142 (466)	46	2008	
17=	Alas Building		Buenos Aires; 34°35′57″S 58°22′14.1″W	141 (462)	42	1955	Tallest building in Buenos Aires and Argentina from 1955 until 1993.
17=	Alto Palermo Plaza		Buenos Aires; 34°35′08.8″S 58°24′37.5″W	141 (462)	35	1995	
17=	Alto Palermo Park		Buenos Aires; 34°35′07.9″S 58°24′39.5″W	141 (462)	35	1997	
17=	Maui I		Rosario; 32°55′40.6″S 60°39′24″W	141 (462)	47	2014	Tallest building in Argentina outside of Buenos Aires City.
21	Madero Office		Buenos Aires; 34°35′54.8″S 58°21′52.6″W	140 (459)	27	2010	
22	Mirabilia Palermo I		Buenos Aires; 34°34′56.5″S 58°25′52.9″W	139 (456)	45	2008	
23=	BankBoston Tower		Buenos Aires; 34°35′40.7″S 58°22′17.6″W	137 (449)	35	2001	
25=	Dolfines Guaraní I		Rosario; 32°55′37.4″S 60°39′32.7″W	137 (449)	45	2010	
25=	Dolfines Guaraní II		Rosario; 32°55′38.3″S 60°39′29.8″W	137 (449)	45	2010	
26	Bellini Esmeralda Plaza San Martín		Buenos Aires; 34°35′50.94″S 58°22′43.78″W	136 (448)	45	2016	
27=	Yacht Tower I		Buenos Aires; 34°36′14″S 58°21′47.4″W	135 (443)	45	2014	
17=	Yacht Tower II		Buenos Aires; 34°36′16″S 58°21′46.7″W	135 (443)	45	2014	
29=	Renoir I		Buenos Aires; 34°36′36″S 58°21′42.5″W	135 (442)	41	2008	
29=	Libertador 4444		Buenos Aires; 34°34′03.3″S 58°25′52.7″W	135 (442)	45	1994	
29=	955 Belgrano Office		Buenos Aires; 34°36′45.6″S 58°22′47.8″W	135 (442)	30	2014	
32	Château Libertador Residence		Buenos Aires; 34°32′52.6″S 58°27′23.7″W	133 (436)	40	2009	
33=	Torre Banco Macro		Buenos Aires; 34°35′38.96″S 58°22′18.34″W	130 (426)	30	2017	
33=	Alvear Icon Hotel		Buenos Aires; 34°36′38.07″S 58°21′41.66″W	130 (426)	32	2017	Tallest hotel in Buenos Aires and Argentina.
35=	Capitalinas I		Córdoba; 31°24′25.68″S 64°11′26.94″W	127 (415)	37	N/D	Tallest building in Córdoba Province, along with Capitalinas II.
35=	Capitalinas II		Córdoba; 31°24′25.68″S 64°11′26.94″W	127 (415)	37	2019	
37=	200 Della Paolera		Buenos Aires; 34°35′40.78″S 58°22′14.63″W	125 (410)	33	2020	
37=	Demetrio Elíades Building		Mar del Plata; 38°00′31.6″S 57°32′17″W	125 (410)	40	1969	Tallest building in Mar del Plata and Buenos Aires Province.
37=	Aqualina Tower		Rosario; 32°57′03.3″S 60°37′44″W	125 (410)	41	2009	
40	San Martín 344		Buenos Aires; 34°36′13.7″S 58°22′27.1″W	122 (400)	29	2001	
41=	Centennial Tower 1		Buenos Aires; 34°32′28.9″S 58°27′50.9″W	121 (397)	37	2004	
41=	Carlos Pellegrini Building		Buenos Aires; 34°35′43.7″S 58°22′17.7″W	121 (397)	31	1974	
41=	Torre Alem Plaza		Buenos Aires; 34°35′51.4″S 58°22′15.5″W	121 (397)	32	1996	
44=	Kavanagh Building		Buenos Aires; 34°35′43.5″S 58°22′28.8″W	120 (394)	30	1936	At the time of construction, it was the tallest building in Latin America and the tallest reinforced concrete structure in the world. It was declared a Historic Civil Engineering Landmark by the American Society of Civil Engineers in 1994 and a National Historic Monument by the Argentine government in 1999. In the year of its completion, the building obtained the Municipal Award for Collective Houses and Facades and three years later its facade received a similar award from the American Institute of Architects.
44=	Libertador 380		Buenos Aires; 34°35′25.6″S 58°22′46″W	120 (394)	35	1985	
44=	Torre Alcorta		Buenos Aires; 34°34′31.6″S 58°24′16″W	120 (394)	29	2009	
44=	Quartier Boulevard		Buenos Aires; 34°34′54.5″S 58°25′50.8″W	120 (394)	37	2008	
44=	Caballito Nuevo 1		Buenos Aires; 36°36′42.4″S 58°26′38.1″W	120 (394)	34	2010	
44=	Caballito Nuevo 2		Buenos Aires; 36°36′44.1″S 58°26′38.7″W	120 (394)	34	2011	

== Under construction ==
This lists buildings that are under construction in Argentina and are planned to rise at least 120 metres (394 ft).

Indicates buildings that have been topped out.

Name	Location	Height m (ft)	Floors	Year (est.)	Notes
Harbour Tower	Buenos Aires; 34°37′11.8″S 58°21′35.4″W	192 (629)	53	2025	Will be the second tallest skyscraper in Argentina upon completion.
Avenida Cordoba 120	Buenos Aires; 34°35′55.2″S 58°22′12.7″W	153 (502)	35	2025	
Torre Bella	Buenos Aires	150 (492)	47	2024	
Quantum Libertador 1	Buenos Aires; 34°32′42.9″S 58°27′23.6″W	127 (416)	40	2024	
Odeón Tower	Buenos Aires; 34°36′13.8″S 58°22′39.9″W	125 (410)	32	N/D	
L'Avenue Libertador	Buenos Aires	122 (400)	34	2024	
Torre Huergo 475	Buenos Aires	120 (394)	37	2025	
Torres Costanera Sur, Hilton Garden Inn	Corrientes	120 (394)	35	2024	

== See also ==
- List of tallest buildings in Buenos Aires
- List of tallest buildings in South America
