= Harbour Tower =

Skyscraper in Buenos Aires

- Harbour Tower in May 2026

General information
- Status: Completed
- Type: Residential
- Architectural style: Postmodernist
- Location: Buenos Aires, Argentina, Julieta Lanteri 1775, Dique 1, Puerto Madero
- Coordinates: 34.61951°S 58.35969°W
- Construction started: September 2016
- Completed: 2026
- Opening: March 2027

Height
- Roof: 192 m (630 ft)

Technical details
- Structural system: Concrete
- Floor count: 53
- Floor area: 50,539 m^{2} (544,000 sq ft)
- Lifts/elevators: 10

Design and construction
- Architects: Carlos Ott; Urgell-Penedo-Urgell
- Developer: GNV Group
- Main contractor: Constructora Sudamericana

Website
- harbourtower.com.ar

The Harbour Tower is a residential skyscraper in the Puerto Madero district of Buenos Aires, Argentina. Topped out in 2026 and standing at 192 m (630 ft) tall with 53 floors, the tower will be the second-tallest building in Argentina upon opening.

== History ==
On September 13, 2016, president of the real estate and urban development firm GNV Group, Alejandro Ginevra, the Uruguayan-Canadian architect Carlos Ott, and several other public officials laid the foundation stone of the project as they announced the strategy of the construction. The tower is part of the Puerto Madero district. The investment costs of the entire project rose to a total of 750 million dollars, with 300 million used for planning and another 450 million allocated for the execution of the project, making it the most expensive residential property in Argentina. Along with the Harbour Tower, the lower-height Osten Towers will also be components of the residential district.

In 2019, after the construction suffered several delays due to project changes, the Caputo company completed the foundation 50 metres (160 ft) underground and put the construction of the rest of the tower out to tender, with Constructora Sudamericana engineering company taking charge. Also in July 2019, an agreement was reached with Marriott International that the tower would have W Hotels chain suites operating as part of the residential complex.

== Architecture ==
The building is located at the corner of Lola Mora and Julieta Lanteri boulevards, facing the plaza of Dique 1 subdistrict of Puerto Madero within the Madero Harbour mixed-use development. Its location ensures open views of the river from the first floors and panoramic views of Puerto Madero and the city from the middle of the tower. Designed by the renowned Uruguayan architect Carlos Ott, who sought to create an icon of avant-garde architecture, the project is being managed by Estudio Urgell-Penedo-Urgell architecture firm.

The tower's main functionality is residential housing, consisting of a total of 217 apartment units with 1,800 m^{2} (19,400 sq ft) of leisure areas, with some two-room units on the lower levels. The volume of the construction outlines an irregular layout of rectangular motives forming a postmodernist sculpture. Exterior panelling features floor-to-ceiling glass-vitrated facades with a total surface of 21,000 m^{2} (226,000 sq ft) of glasswork which were installed in 24 months. Each level of the tower measures three-meters in height. Topped out and architecturally completed in 2026, it will be the second tallest tower in Buenos Aires and in Argentina upon opening, after the Alvear Tower. The inauguration was initially scheduled for the second half of 2026 but was changed for March 2027 due to unit sales process.

== Construction chronology ==
The tower in December 2024

The tower in March 2025

== See also ==
- List of tallest buildings in Argentina
- List of tallest buildings in Buenos Aires
- List of tallest buildings in South America
