= El Faro Towers =

Residential skyscrapers in Buenos Aires, Argentina

- Torres El Faro
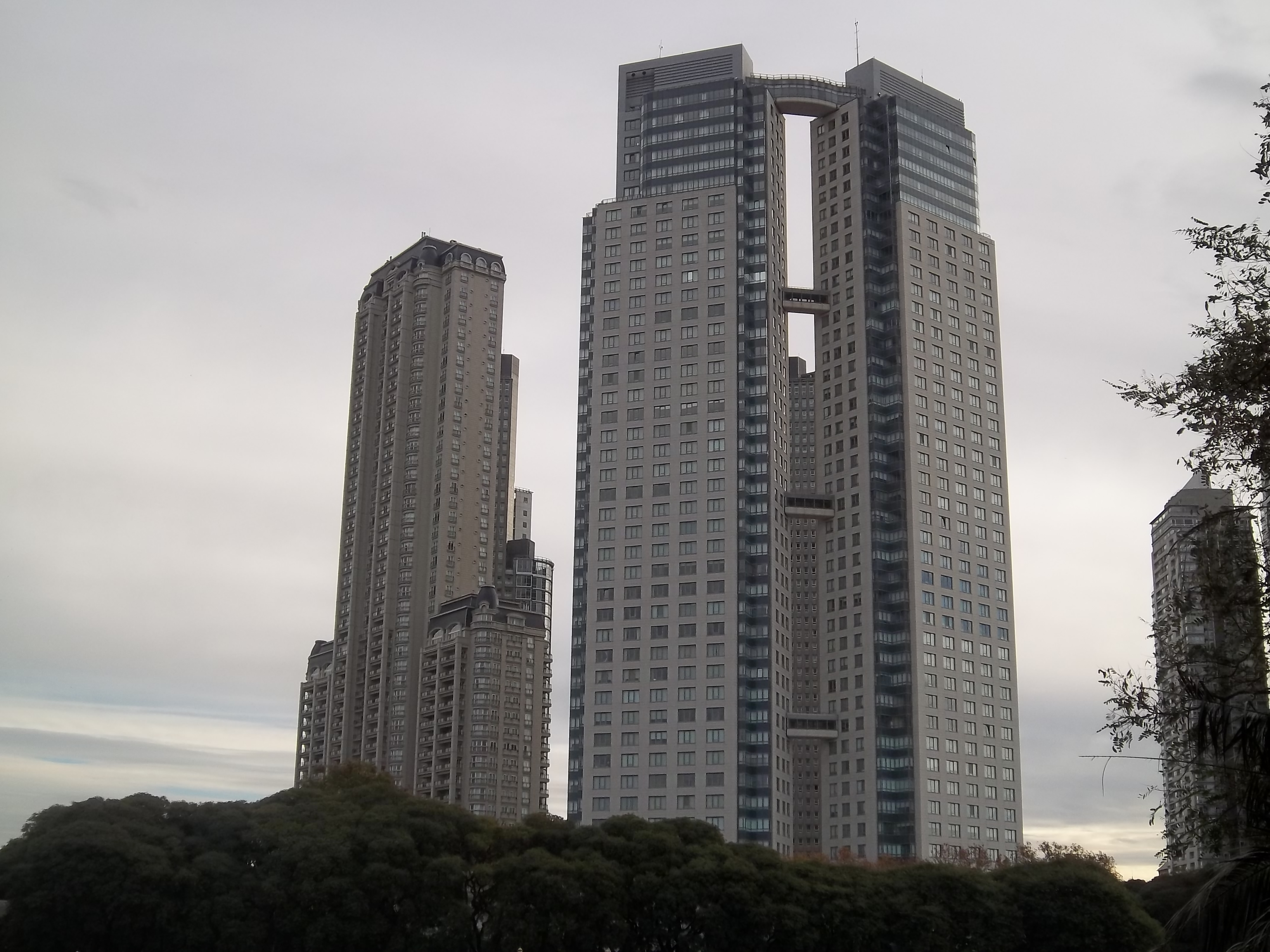

- Location within Argentina

General information
- Status: Completed
- Type: Residential
- Location: Puerto Madero, Buenos Aires
- Coordinates: 34°36′44.3″S 58°21′34″W
- Construction started: 2001 (I), 2003 (II)
- Completed: 2003 (I), 2005 (II)

Height
- Antenna spire: 185 m (607 ft)
- Roof: 160 m (520 ft)
- Top floor: 160 m (520 ft)

Technical details
- Floor count: 46
- Floor area: 57,190 m^{2} (615,600 ft^{2})

Design and construction
- Architects: Berardo Dujovne; Silvia Hirsh

The El Faro Towers (Spanish: Torres El Faro "Lighthouse Towers"), also known as El Faro I/II, when referring to the complex individually, or El Faro Complex, when referring to the pair as a whole, are a highrise residential complex of two, twin interconnected skyscrapers located in the neighborhood of Puerto Madero, in Buenos Aires, the capital and largest city of Argentina. The El Faro Towers are made of glass, most specially used for the skyscraper's windows, and reinforced concrete. Although the two towers did not commence their construction at the same time, the first and second skyscrapers' construction ceased in 2003 and 2005, respectively. The twin skyscrapers were the tallest structures in Buenos Aires, and Argentina from 2003 to 2009. The towers have a height of 160 m (520 ft).

== History ==
=== Concept and construction ===
The Lighthouse (Spanish: Faro) project was first proposed in 1999, and coincided with a burgeoning interest in redeveloping the dilapidated Puerto Madero docklands on the part of developers. The project was initially designed to include two towers with a height of 170 m (560 ft) each, with 48 floors distributed among them. The towers were to be connected by several aerial bridges at four levels. The development was approved in late 2000, and the construction of first began in 2001, although not all the plans were really fulfilled, such as the towers having a height of 160 m (520 ft) instead of the proposed height of 170 m (560 ft) and the towers having a floor count of 46 instead of 48.

The first tower's construction was completed in 2003, and all units therein were sold by the time construction started on the second tower. While there were several alternative proposals from groups dedicated to the protection of the nearby Buenos Aires Ecological Reserve, objections were also raised over the prior substitution of Act 123 for Act 452, which would have permitted a lesser degree of environmental impact for the project's approval. The second tower was completed in the early months in 2005 and promptly sold out, thus concluding the project. These became the highest in Buenos Aires and Argentina, though the structures were narrowly surpassed in height by the nearby Mulieris towers and the Repsol-YPF tower (both in Puerto Madero) upon these latter's compilation in 2008 (they were, in turn, surpassed by Torre Cavia, part of the Le Parc Figueroa Alcorta complex, in 2009).

== Geography ==
The El Faro Towers are located in the neighborhood of Puerto Madero, in Buenos Aires, the capital and largest city of Argentina. The twin skyscrapers is surrounded by numerous attractions in the area, including several restaurants, a cathedral, a park, several markets and an antique market, a subway, a bookstore and several other stores found nearby, several residential and commercial buildings, since the El Faro Towers themselves are a part of a residential neighborhood, a notable river with a complete set of docks and ferry piers and a natural reserve not far from the skyscrapers.

== Structure and features ==
The El Faro Towers have a total height of 160 m (520 ft) and an area of 57,190 m^{2} (615,600 ft^{2}). The twin skyscrapers were built using reinforced concrete for general support and the towers' walls. The pair of skyscrapers uses glass for the towers' symmetrically designed windows. Aluminum is also used. The two skyscrapers are linked and intertwined together by four sky bridges. The complex houses a total of 160 apartments, outdoor pools, spa, sauna, gyms, tennis court, solarium, two underground parking structures for owners, residents and guests, and other ancillary facilities. A reading and relaxation room is also set up on the top sky bridge between the two buildings.

List of tallest buildings in Argentina
Next Shortest Repsol-YPF Tower; 160	Next Tallest Mulieris Towers; 161
Heights are to highest architectural element.

== Gallery ==
Click on the thumbnail to enlarge.

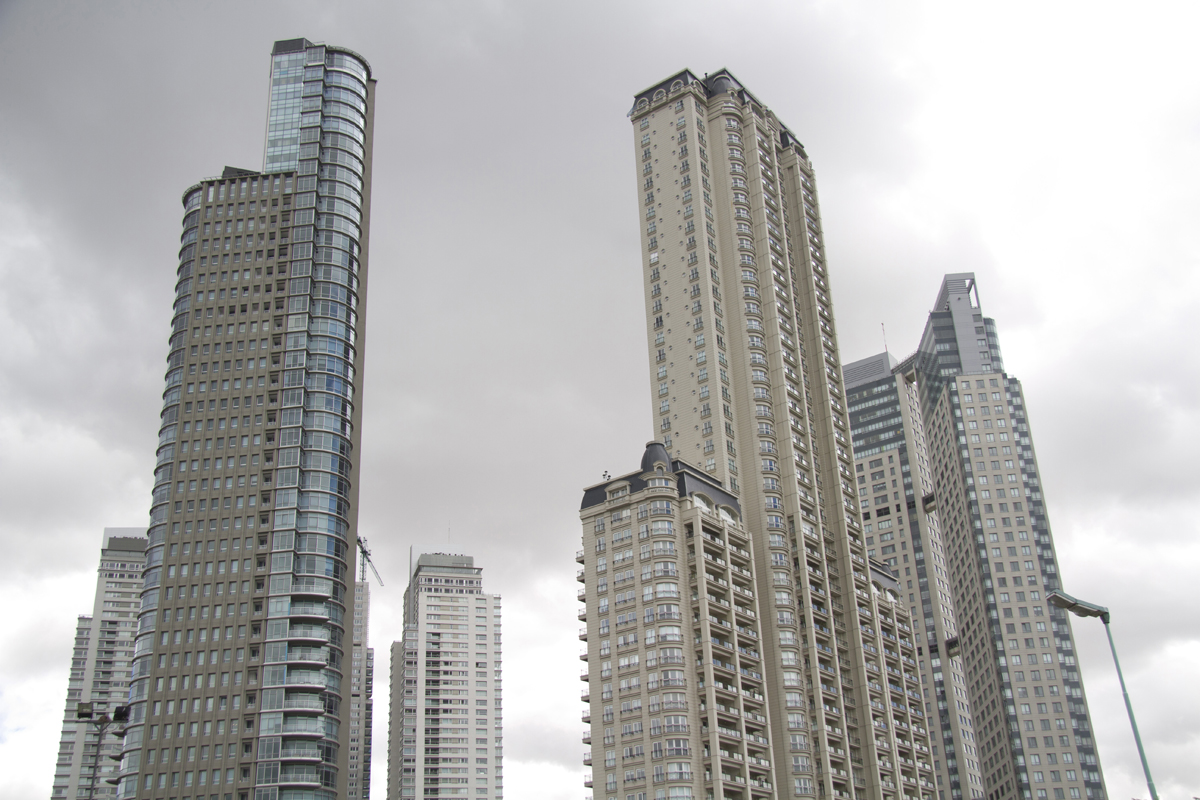
A photo showing most of the neighborhood of Puerto Madero's known highrise, with the El Faro Towers (back right) in the background.

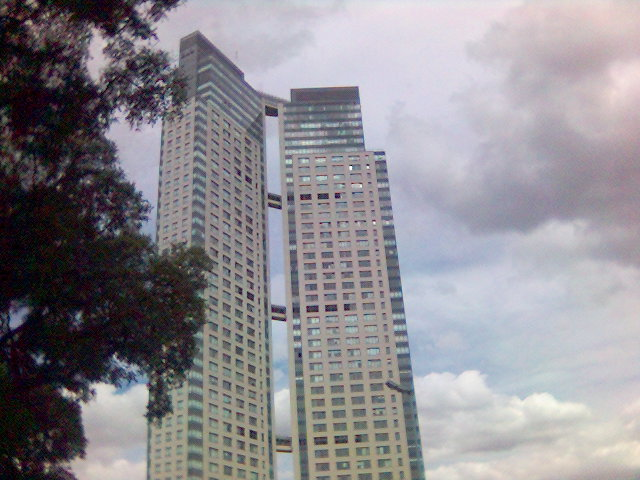
Front view of the El Faro Towers, shot from the river near the two skyscrapers.

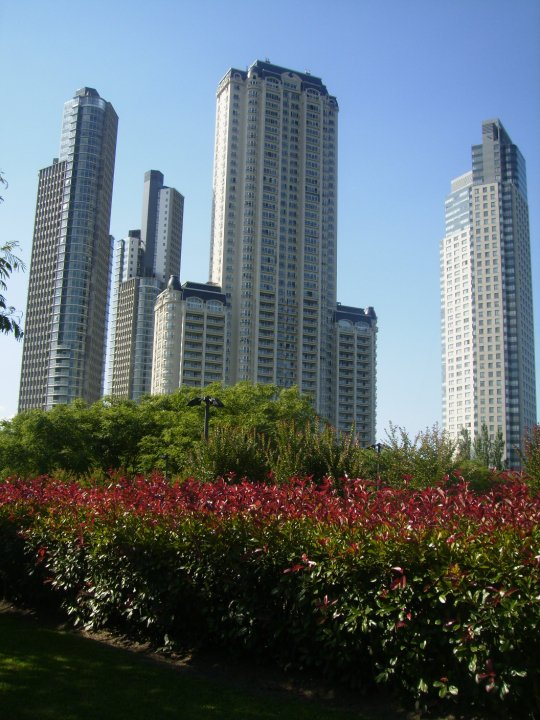
El Faro Towers (right), with several other highrise skyscrapers such as the Château Tower (foreground) and the Mulieris towers (left).

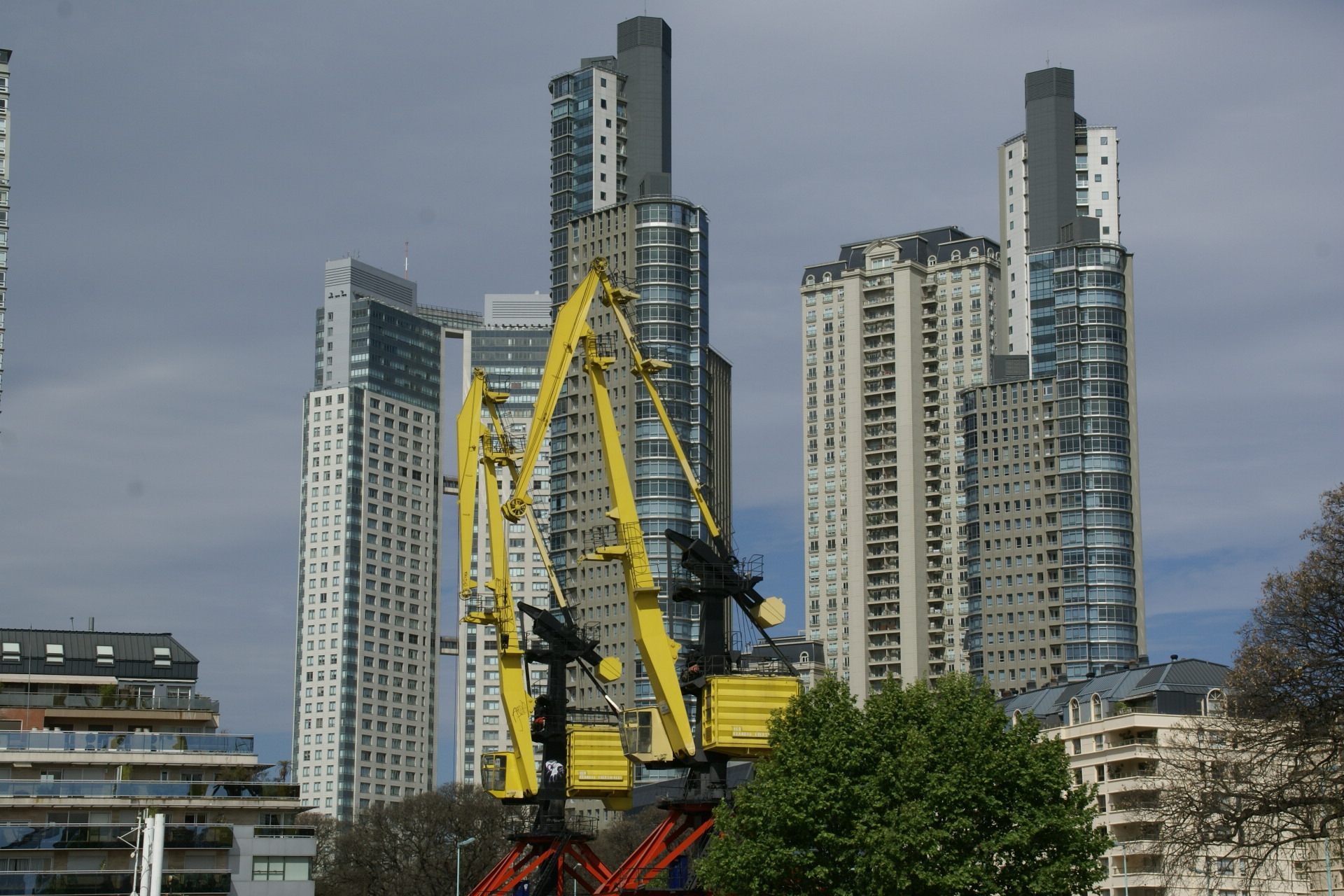
Construction (foreground) ongoing near the skyscrapers' area, with the El Faro Towers (back left) in the background.

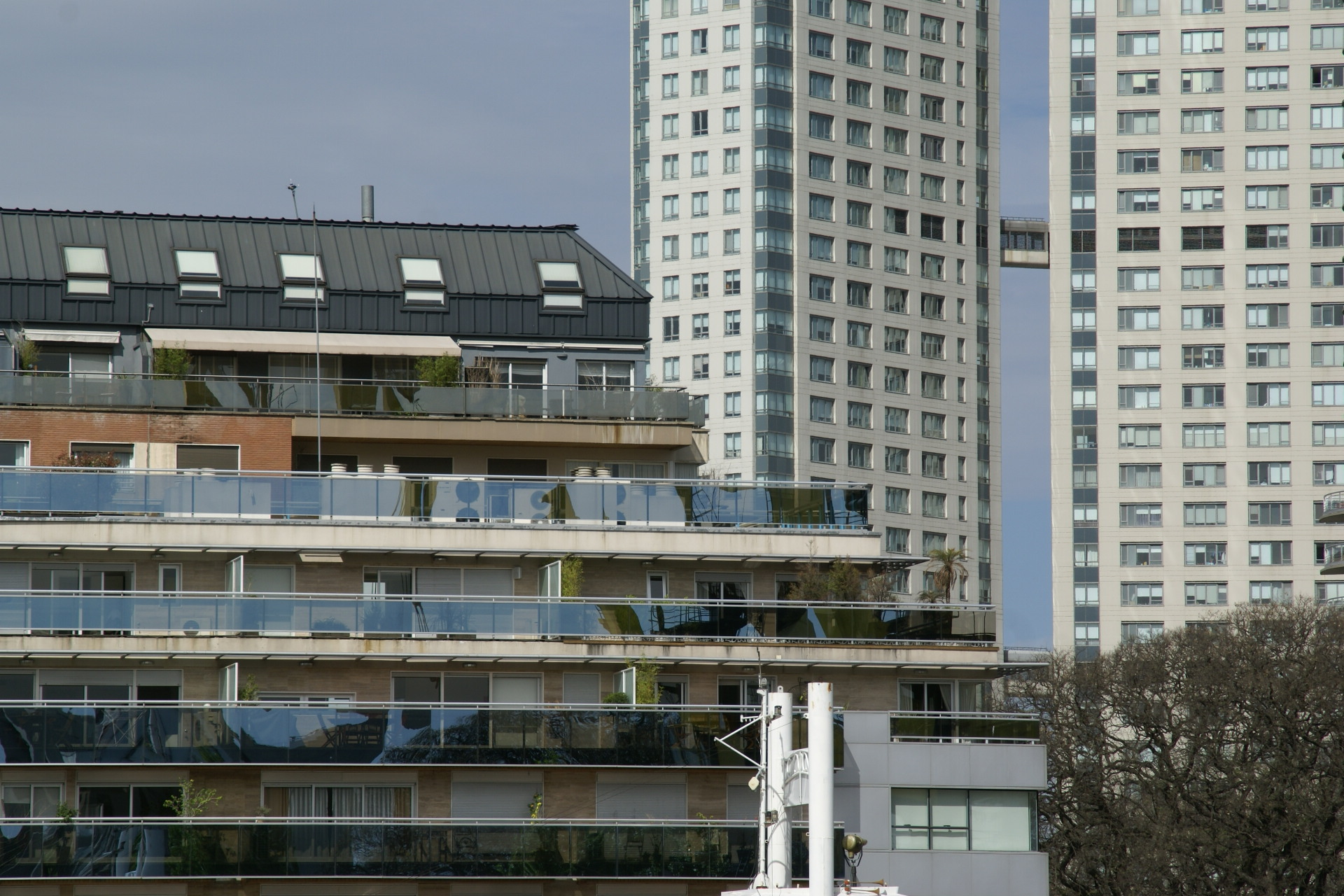
An apartment (foreground) at the foot of the El Faro Towers (back right).

== See also ==
- Torre Cavia
- Torre del Café
- Torre de Herveo
