= Torres del Yacht =

Skyscraper in Buenos Aires

General information
- Status: Completed
- Type: Residential
- Location: Buenos Aires, Argentina, Juana Manso 550, Puerto Madero
- Coordinates: 34.60360°S 58.36323°W
- Construction started: 2010
- Completed: 2014
- Owner: Sociedad de Inversiones

Height
- Roof: 135 m (443 ft)

Technical details
- Structural system: Concrete
- Floor count: 45

Design and construction
- Architects: Fernandez Prieto & Asociados; MSGSSS
- Developer: Fernandez Prieto Desarrollos Inmobiliarios
- Structural engineer: AHF
- Main contractor: Edintar Construcciones

Torres del Yacht is a residential skyscraper complex in the Puerto Madero district of Buenos Aires, Argentina. Built between 2010 and 2014, the complex consists of two twin towers standing at 135 m (443 ft) tall with 45 floors each.

== History ==
Torres del Yacht is a complex of two 45-story towers, with apartments ranging from 60 to 110 m^{2} (1,180 sq ft). The three basement levels are designated for parking, and the ground floor will feature a base encompassing commercial spaces, heated swimming pools, a multipurpose room, saunas, a solarium, and a gym. Located in the Dique 4 subdistrict, the development is surrounded by the Yacht Club, the Hilton Buenos Aires, the Fortabat Museum, and the Buenos Aires Ecological Reserve.

It reached its final height during the month of December 2009, and was inaugurated in April of the following year.

The main ornamental feature of the buildings will be two plazas with trees, located on a reinforced concrete structure in each tower, at the level of the first residential floor, as both have arcades that extend up to the seventh floor of apartments. The towers feature a void in their central axis as well as a wind tunnel facade design development. The original project also included landscaping and planting trees on the rooftop, but this idea was later scrapped. The towers have a total usable surface of 70,000 m^{2} (753,000 sq ft) and a total of 216 units.

== Gallery ==
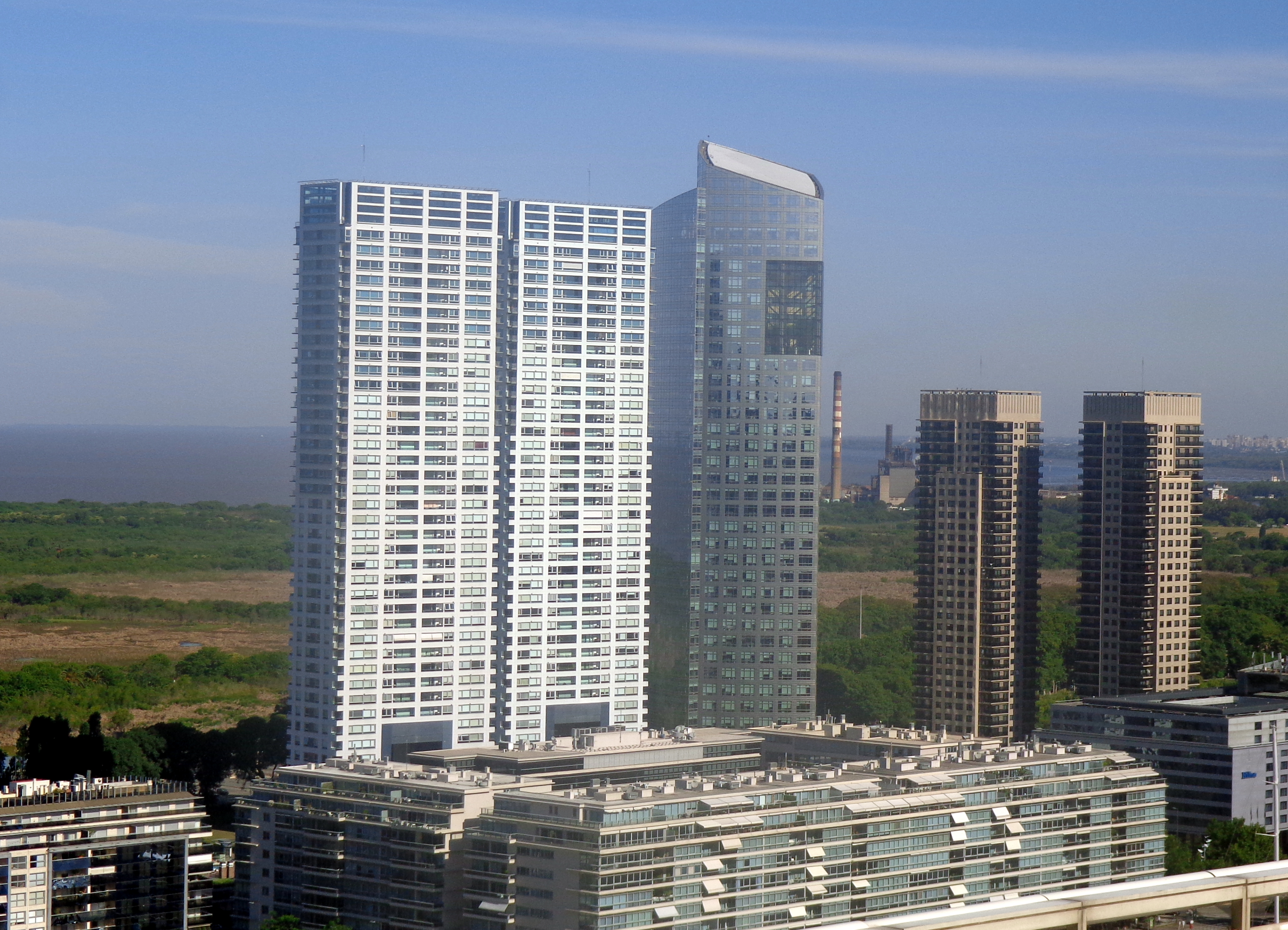
The towers next to the YPF Tower

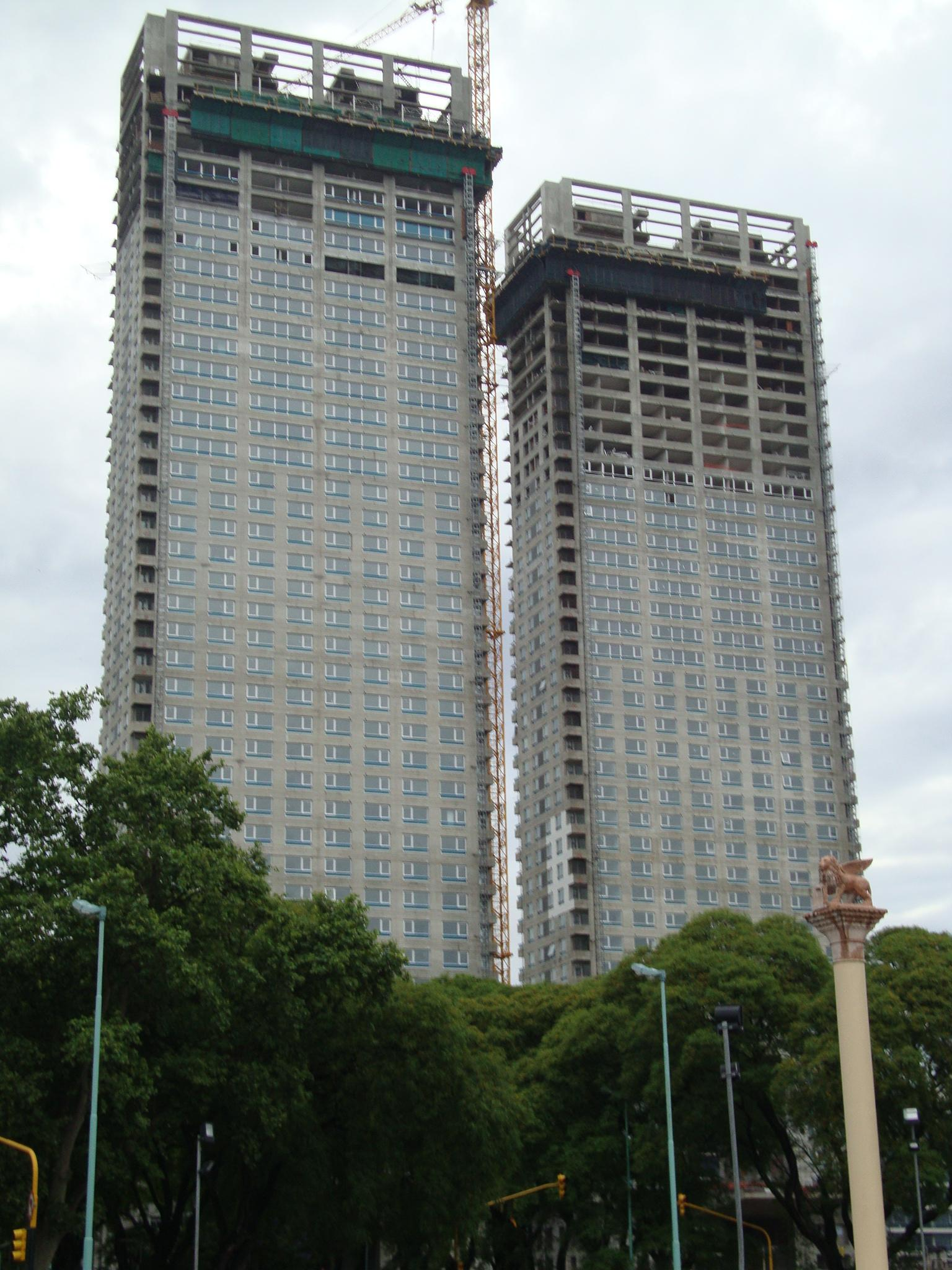
The towers under construction in 2009

== See also ==
- List of tallest buildings in Argentina
- List of tallest buildings in Buenos Aires
- List of tallest buildings in South America
