= Torre Aqualina =

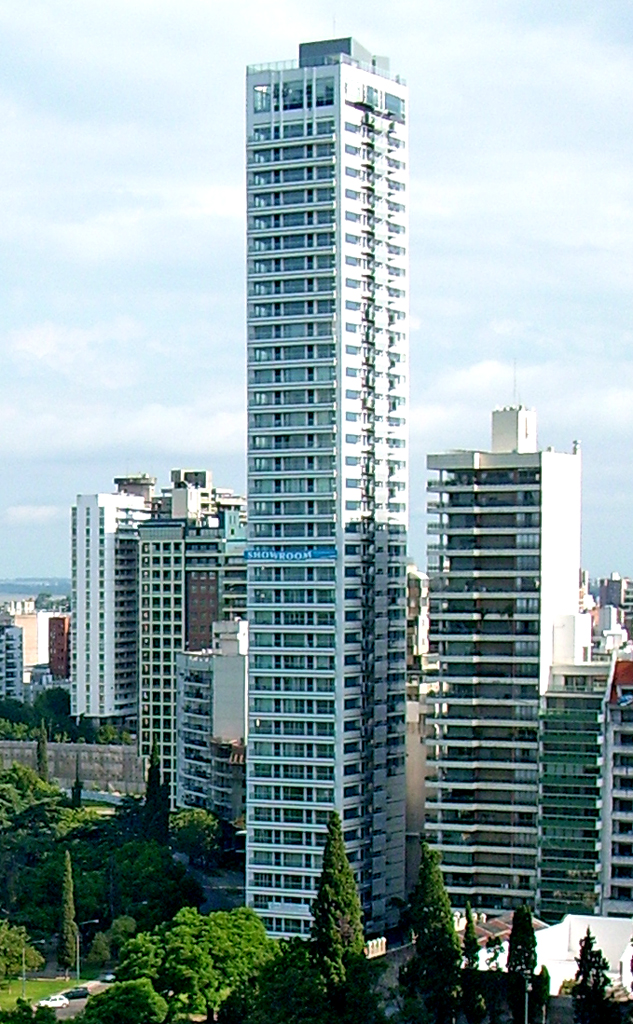

- Location within Argentina

General information
- Location: Rosario, Argentina
- Coordinates: 32.9508°S 60.6288°W
- Construction started: 2005
- Completed: 2009

Height
- Roof: 125 m (410 ft)

Technical details
- Floor count: 41

Design and construction
- Architects: Mario Roberto Álvarez & Asoc.

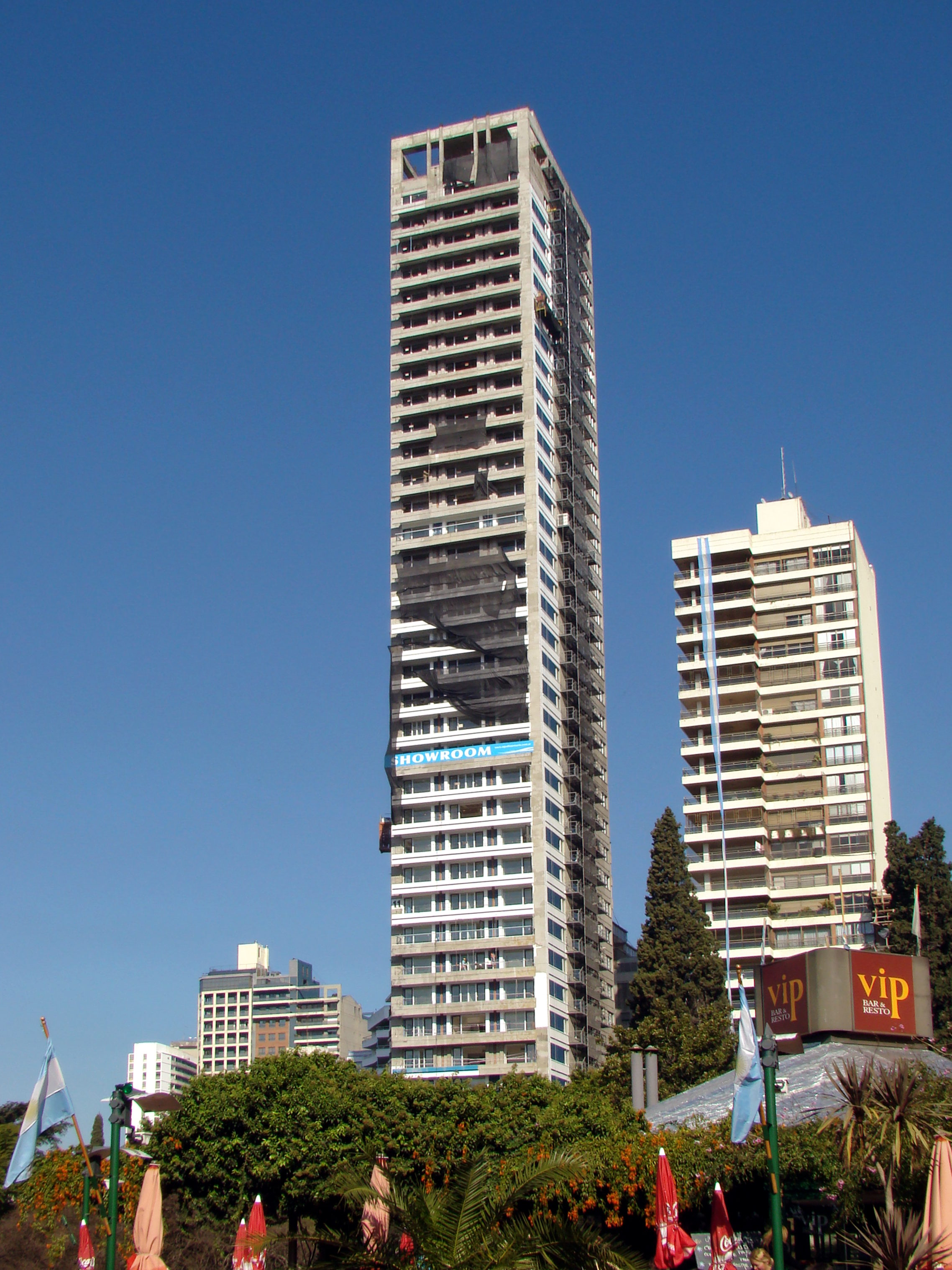
Torre Aqualina, under construction (June 2008)

Torre Aqualina (Spanish, Aqualina Tower) is a high-rise residential building completed in 2009 in Rosario, province of Santa Fe, Argentina. It is located on the corner of San Luis and Alem Streets, in Barrio Martín, a few blocks south of the National Flag Memorial.

The tower is 125 m (410 ft) high, and includes 40 stories devoted to luxury apartments, and 2 basement floors, with a total area of 14,700 m². The apartments feature views of the city center and the Paraná River.

The Torre Aqualina was completed in late 2009, and was until the completion of the Dolfines Guaraní towers, the tallest building in Rosario, as well as in Argentina outside the city of Buenos Aires.

== Design and construction ==
Torre Aqualina was designed by Mario Roberto Álvarez, a Buenos Aires-born architect who also designed (among others) the Le Parc tower (the tallest residential building in Argentina), the seat of the Rosario branch of the Banco de la Nación Argentina, the intelligent building of the Rosario Board of Trade, and the airports of Neuquén and Córdoba.

The building was developed by the Rosario-based firm OP Developers, and the construction contract was awarded to Constructora Sudamericana.

== Criticism ==
Since the project was first presented, in 2003, Aqualina has been criticized by the citizens in its neighbourhood. The builders have assured that the building will harmonize with its environment. During the construction of the tower, two judicial rulings (similar to injunctions) were interposed to stop the works, reacting to demands that an environmental study was needed to assess the impact of the tower on the surroundings. In 2005, an accusation was also filed against the Municipality of Rosario because it had let the works proceed in spite of these rulings. The case went up the judicial ladder until, in May 2007, the Supreme Court of Justice of Santa Fe Province ruled that an environmental impact study of Aqualina was not necessary.
