= Kavanagh Building =

Skyscraper in Buenos Aires, Argentina

- Edificio Kavanagh (Spanish)
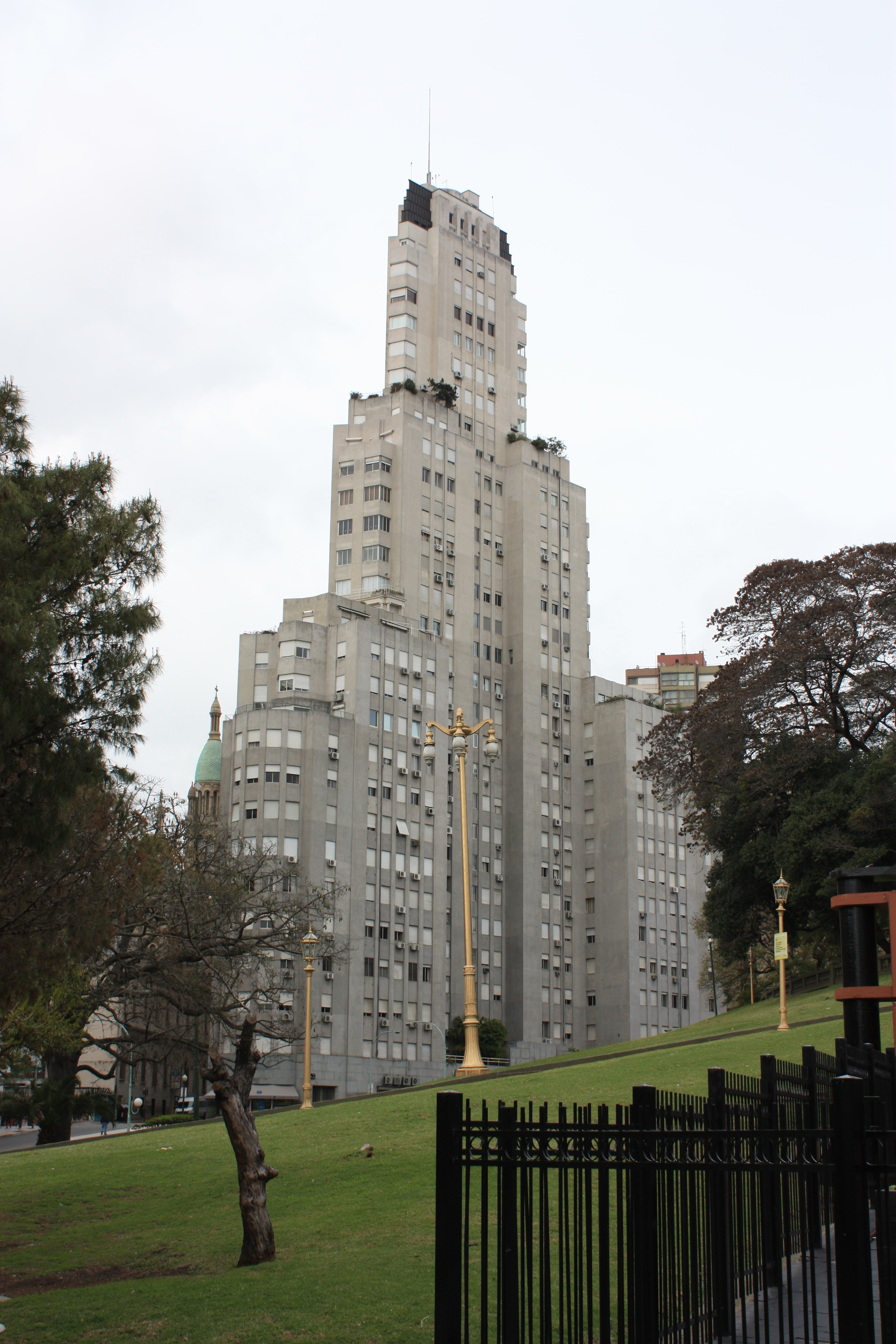
- Kavanagh Building seen from Plaza San Martín
- Interactive map of the Kavanagh Building area

Record height
- Tallest in South America from 1936 to 1947^{[I]}
- Preceded by: Martinelli Building
- Surpassed by: Altino Arantes Building

General information
- Type: Residential
- Location: Florida 1065; Retiro, Buenos Aires; Argentina
- Coordinates: 34°35′43.5″S 58°22′28.8″W
- Construction started: 1934
- Completed: 1936
- Opening: 2 January 1936

Height
- Top floor: 120 m (390 ft)

Technical details
- Floor count: 31
- Floor area: 28,000 m^{2} (300,000 sq ft), on 2,400 m^{2} (26,000 sq ft)
- Lifts/elevators: 12

Design and construction
- Architects: Gregorio Sánchez, Ernesto Lagos, and Luis María de la Torre
- Main contractor: Rodolfo Cervini

National Historic Monument of Argentina
- Designated: 1999

The Kavanagh Building (Spanish: Edificio Kavanagh) is a residential skyscraper in Retiro, Buenos Aires, Argentina. Designed in 1934 by architects Gregorio Sánchez, Ernesto Lagos and Luis María de la Torre, it is considered a pinnacle of modernist architecture. At the time of its inauguration in 1936, the Kavanagh was the tallest building in Latin America surpassing the Palacio Salvo built in Montevideo, Uruguay in 1928, as well as the tallest building in the world with a reinforced concrete structure.

It is considered one of the quintessential buildings of Buenos Aires. A 2013 Clarín survey of 600 people who are not architects or builders found that the Kavanagh is the building most liked by porteños. The Kavanagh Building was declared a Historic Civil Engineering Landmark by the American Society of Civil Engineers in 1994 and a National Historic Monument of Argentina in 1999.

== Location ==
The Kavanagh Building is located at 1065 Florida Street in the barrio of Retiro, overlooking Plaza San Martín.

== History ==
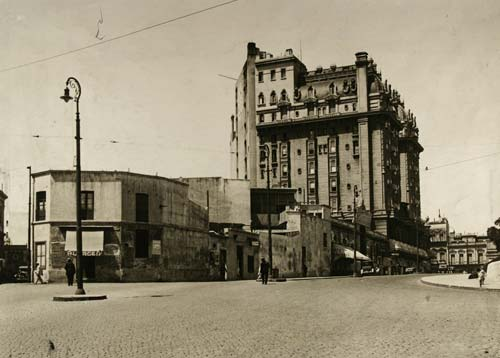
View of the houses where the Kavanagh would later be built, 1926

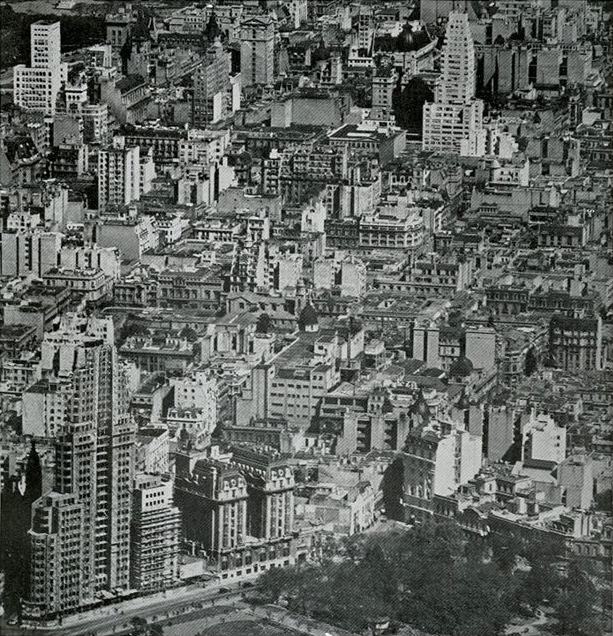
The center of Buenos Aires in 1936, with the Kavanagh Building in the lower left corner

It was designed in 1934, by local architects Gregorio Sánchez, Ernesto Lagos and Luis María de la Torre, built by the constructor and engineer Rodolfo Cervini, and inaugurated in 1936. Standing at a height of 120 meters, the building is characterised by the austerity of its lines, the lack of external ornamentation, and its large prismatic volumes. It was declared a Historic Civil Engineering Landmark by the American Society of Civil Engineers in 1994 and a National Historic Monument by the Argentine government in 1999. In the year of its completion the building obtained the Municipal Award for Collective Houses and Facades (Premio Municipal de Casa Colectiva y de Fachada), and three years later its façade received a similar award from the American Institute of Architects.

It was commissioned in 1934 by Corina Kavanagh, a millionaire of Irish descent who sold two ranches at the age of 39 to erect her own skyscraper. Construction took 14 months. The building has a towering form, with symmetrical setbacks and gradual surface reductions. It was created from the outside in. The structure was designed to be as slender as possible, in order to avoid unnecessary weight, and influenced by city planning regulations. The design combines Modernism and Art Deco with a Rationalist approach, and is considered the apex of early Modernism in Argentina.

The building of the concrete structure was awarded to the Empresa Argentina de Cemento Armado, E.A.C.A. of engineers Garbarini, Meuer and Gorostiaga. The tender was made based on a preliminary project prepared by structural engineer Carlos Laucher. The final design of the structure was executed by the Technical Office of E.A.C.A., led by Eng. Fernando Schwarz, responsible for the design and calculations of the highest concrete skeleton in the world. At the time soil mechanics—used to calculate the bearing capacity of the ground—was in its infancy, and there were limited tools to calculate wind resistance.

It was at the time the highest skyscraper in Latin America. As the apartments in the new building were aimed at the affluent upper middle classes, no expense was spared in its construction. All 105 apartments contained the latest in technological advances, including central air conditioning, twelve Otis elevators, and state-of-the-art plumbing. Upper-floor apartments have terrace gardens with views of the river, parks and the city.

Corina Kavanagh lived there for many years in an apartment occupying the entire 14th floor. There is a legend that says that the shape of the building was designed as revenge: Kavanagh's daughter fell in love with a son of the wealthy and aristocratic Anchorena family. The Anchorenas, who lived in a palace on the other side of Plaza San Martín today known as the San Martín Palace and had built a church that they could see from their palace, disapproved of the engagement. In revenge, Kavanagh required that her building block the Anchorena family's view of their church.

== Architecture ==
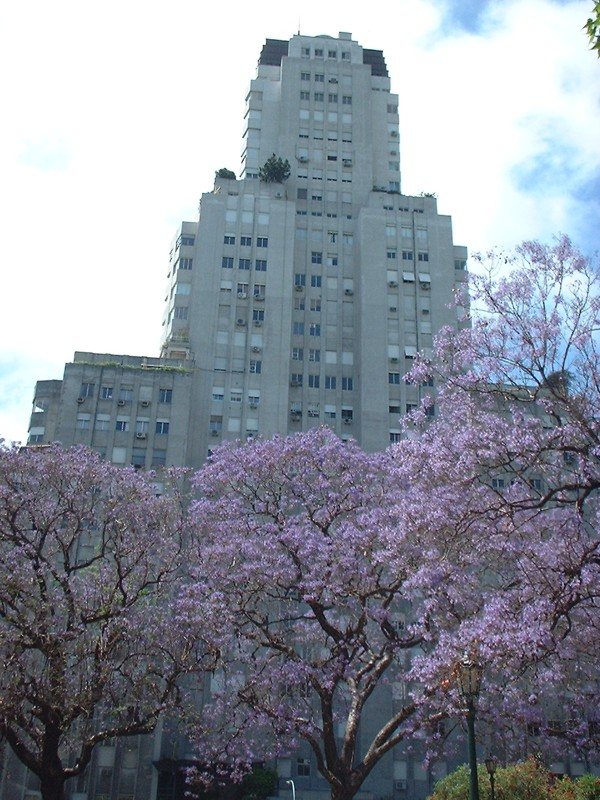
The Kavanagh Building, with jacaranda trees in full bloom

The Kavanagh Building is considered a leading example of International Style architecture, known locally as rationalism or modern movement. The building is sometimes classified as Art Deco due to the similarity of both styles. La Nación's Fabio Grementieri called it a "masterful synthesis of rationalism and Art Deco, of renewal and tradition, of Paris and New York." Rationalism was introduced in Buenos Aires by intellectual Victoria Ocampo with the modernist house she commissioned from architect Alejandro Bustillo, built in Barrio Parque in 1929 and characterized by "simple cubic shapes, white walls and neat proportions". Its contrast with the Belle Époque-style houses of the rest of the neighborhood, popular among the city's upper classes, led to critical reviews. Nevertheless, Ocampo's house proved to be very influential as the rationalist style gained popularity during the 1930s. It was used in hospitals, movie theaters and three high-rise buildings: the Kavanagh, Comega and Safico buildings. These early skyscrapers are characterized by the ziggurat-like approach of their design, mandated by a municipal regulation analogous to New York City's 1916 Zoning Resolution, which had been adopted to stop tall buildings from preventing light and air from reaching the streets below. The Kavanagh Building showcases the growing influence of American architecture in the region at the time, caused by the political confrontation in Europe and technological transformations.

== See also ==
- List of Art Deco architecture
- List of firsts in architecture
- List of tallest buildings in Argentina
- List of tallest buildings in Buenos Aires
