= L'Avenue Libertador =

Skyscraper in Rio de Janeiro, Brazil

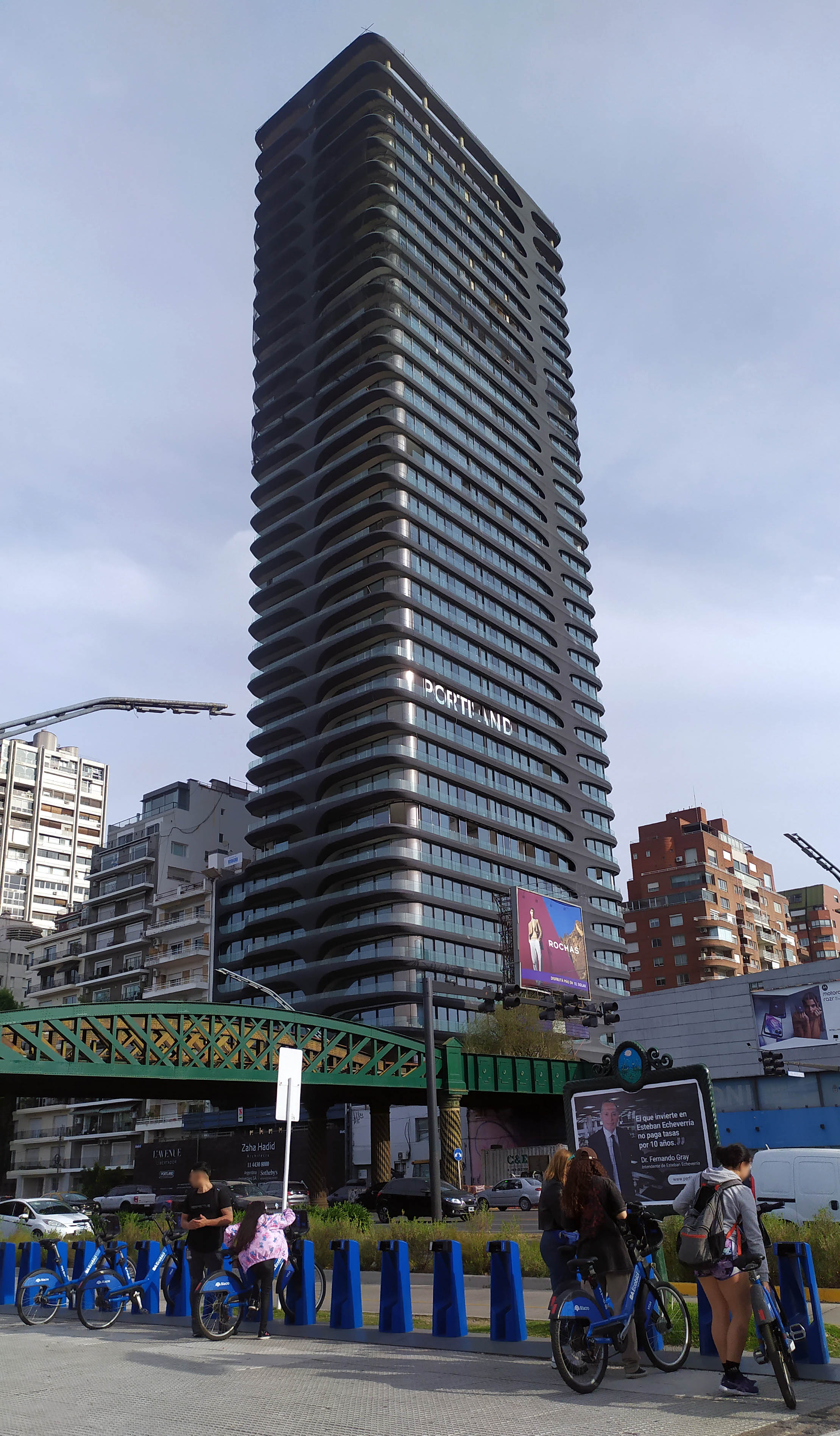
- L'Avenue Libertador in 2024

General information
- Location: Buenos Aires, Argentina
- Coordinates: 34.571993°S 58.422561°W

Height
- Height: 123 m (404 ft)

L'Avenue Libertador is a residential skyscraper in Buenos Aires, Argentina.

== History ==
The skyscraper, developed by Grupo Portland starting in 2018, was designed by the architectural firm Zaha Hadid Architects, represented the firm's first completed project in Latin America.

== Description ==
The luxury residential building is located at the corner between Avenida del Libertador and Avenida Intendente Bullrich in the Palermo district of Buenos Aires. The tower reaches a height of 123 meters and has 36 floors. The project is distinguished by its sculptural volumes and by the façade featuring curvilinear and asymmetrical balconies, elements typical of Hadid's architectural language.

== See also ==
- List of tallest buildings in Buenos Aires
