= Dolfines Guaraní =

Residential towers

Coordinates: 32°55′38″S 60°39′30″W

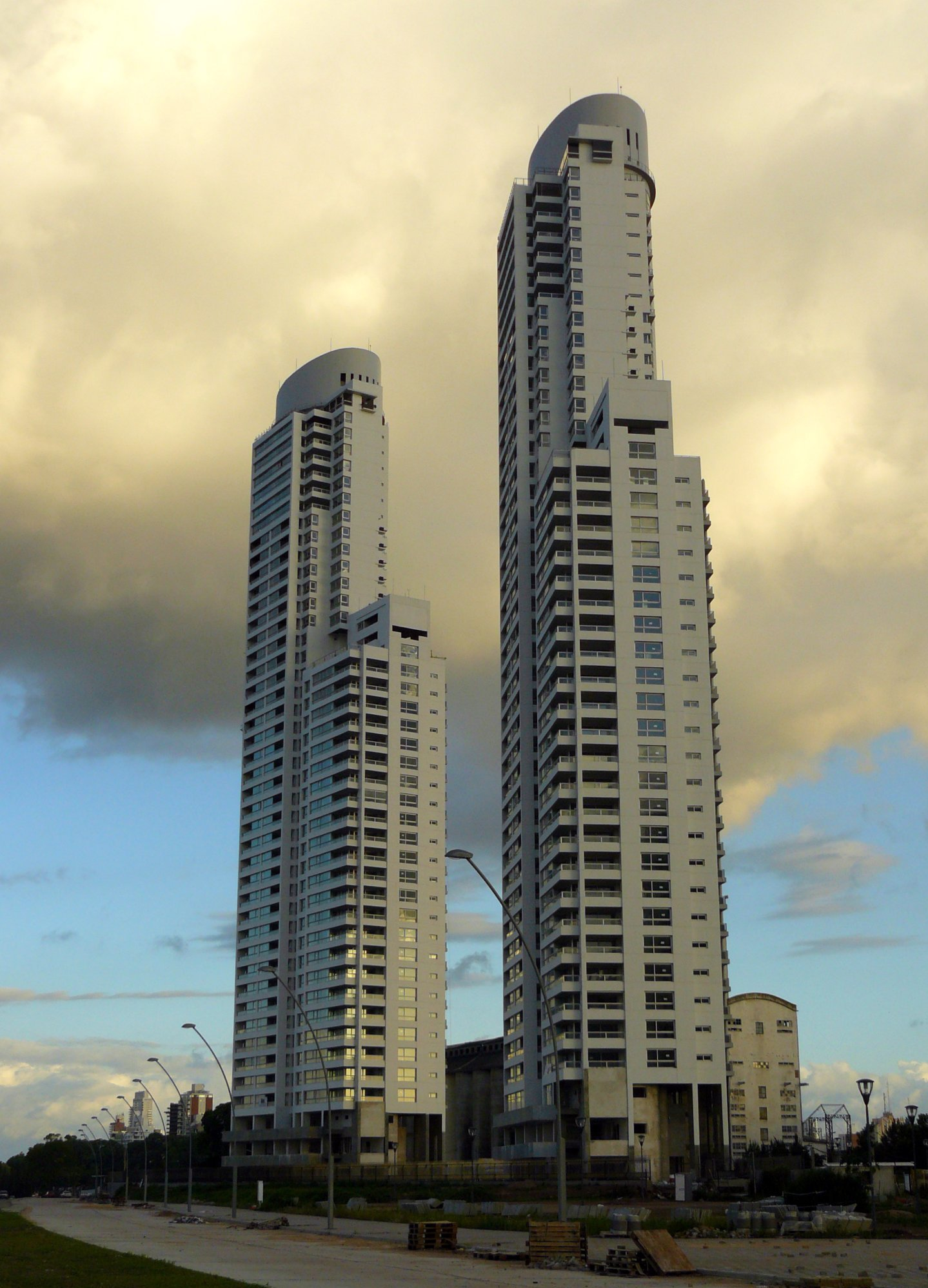
Dolfines Guaraní complex, January 2010

The Dolfines Guaraní complex is a pair of high-rise luxury apartment buildings in Rosario, Santa Fe, Argentina.

Completed in 2011, the development comprises twin towers (Dolfines Guaraní 1 and 2), with 46 floors, 136.5 metres (448 ft) high. Upon completion, they became the tallest buildings in the country outside of Buenos Aires.

The towers are located on the area known as Puerto Norte, facing the Paraná River.

List of tallest buildings in Argentina
Next Shortest Renoir Tower I 135m	Next Tallest BankBoston Tower; 140 m
Heights are to highest architectural element.
