= Le Parc Figueroa Alcorta =

Residential complex in Buenos Aires, Argentina

Le Parc Figueroa Alcorta complex
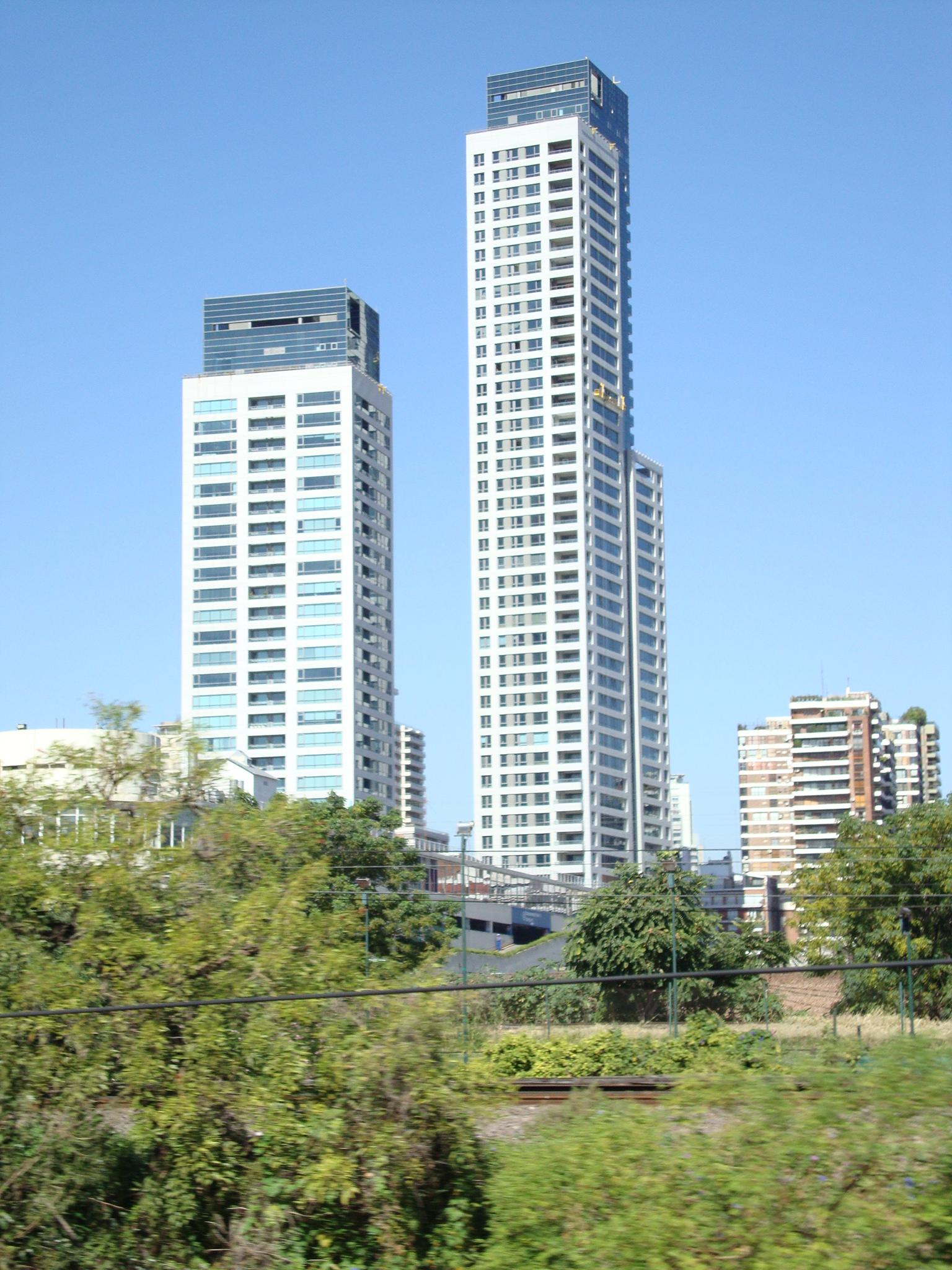
- Interactive map of the Le Parc Figueroa Alcorta complex area

Record height
- Surpassed by: Torre Renoir II

General information
- Location: Buenos Aires, Argentina
- Coordinates: 34°34′32.6″S 58°24′18″W
- Construction started: 2006
- Completed: 2009

Height
- Height: 172.8 and 120 m (567 and 394 ft)

Technical details
- Floor count: 45 and 29

Design and construction
- Architect: Estudio Aisenson

Le Parc Figueroa Alcorta is a residential complex comprising the Alcorta and Cavia towers. The tallest one (Cavia) is 173 m (568 ft) tall, and the Alcorta tower is 120 m (390 ft) tall.

== History ==
The towers were designed by the Lanuzzi studio and are under construction in the Palermo neighborhood of Buenos Aires, Argentina. The residential complex is the third of its type the Raghsa Group of Buenos Aires is developing in the city, after Le Parc Residential Tower (1995) and Le Parc Puerto Madero (2006). Raghsa has developed numerous commercial real estate projects in Buenos Aires, as well.

This complex is one in a series of such developments announced in major Argentine cities since the Argentine economy began to recover in 2003 from a serious financial crisis. Following their successful development of three residential towers in their Le Parc Puerto Madero project, Raghsa announced in 2006 the construction of two premier residential buildings on Buenos Aires' upscale Figueroa Alcorta Avenue.

The tallest tower in the complex, Cavia, was originally planned to be the tallest building in Buenos Aires, surpassing the previous proposed record-holder: Renoir II in Puerto Madero, with 171 m (561 ft). Following this announcement, however, DYPSA, the developers of the Renoir complex, decided to add one more level and extend Renoir II's height to 175 m (574 ft). Should DYPSA complete Renoir II to these specifications, the Cavia Tower will be the tallest building in Buenos Aires for just one year. Le Parc Figueroa Alcorta broke ground on the intersection of the Figueroa Alcorta Avenue and Cavia Street. in 2006, joining the development of numerous competing projects, many of them scheduled for completion on or before 2010, the year of the Argentine Bicentennial.

== See also ==
- List of tallest buildings in South America
- List of tallest buildings in Argentina
