= Le Parc Puerto Madero =

Skyscraper in Buenos Aires

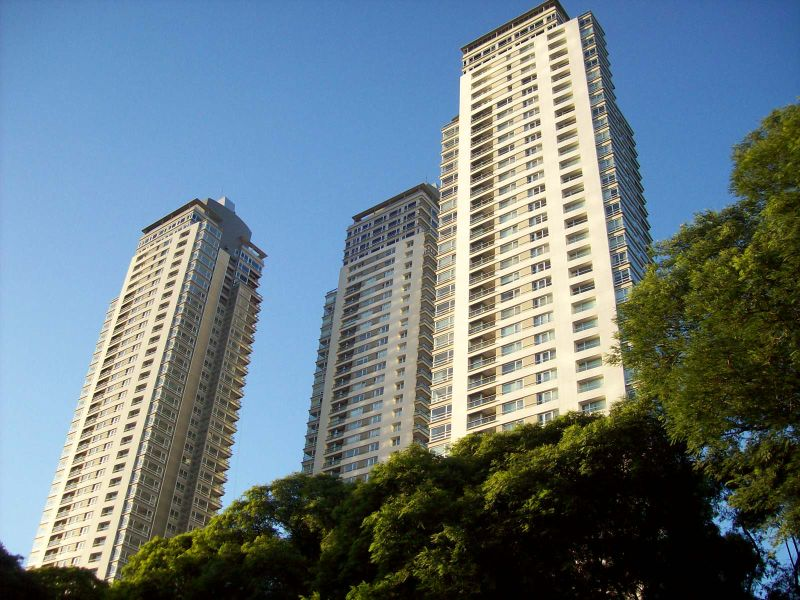
- Interactive map of the Le Parc Puerto Madero area

General information
- Status: Completed
- Type: Residential
- Location: Buenos Aires, Argentina, Puerto Madero C1107, Buenos Aires
- Coordinates: 34.61123°S 58.36097°W
- Construction started: 2004
- Completed: 2007 (Torre del Boulevard); 2006 (Torre del Parque); 2005 (Torre del Río)
- Owner: Raghsa Sociedad Anónima

Height
- Roof: 144 m (472 ft) (all towers)

Technical details
- Structural system: Concrete
- Floor count: 43
- Floor area: 86,400 m^{2} (930,000 sq ft)

Design and construction
- Architects: Estudio Aisenson; Vidaris, Inc. (façade)
- Developer: Tizado
- Main contractor: Ingeplan S.A.

Le Parc Puerto Madero is a residential building complex in Buenos Aires, Argentina. The complex comprises three identical skyscraper buildings (Torre del Boulevard, Torre del Parque and Torre del Río) standing at 144 m (472 ft) tall with 43 floors each, completed between 2005 and 2007. The three towers share the thirteenth position in the top of the tallest buildings in Argentina.

== History ==
=== Architecture ===
The Boulevard and the Rio towers are located towards the Azucena Villaflor Boulevard, while the del Parque tower is situated slightly between the latter two, offset towards the interior of the lot, creating a large access patio surrounded by the three bodies. With identical floor plans, each building contains four apartments with either 80 m^{2} (861 sq ft) or 130 m^{2} (1,400 sq ft) usable areas between floor one and 37. Between floor 37 and 40, each building displays two larger apartment units with 180 m^{2} (1,940 sq ft) each. Levels 41 and 42 contain penthouse apartments of 300 m^{2} (3,230 sq ft).

In the area, the original plan called for 'clusters of towers', but it was opted to create a complex containing three tall buildings for luxury apartments, each with its own services. These buildings are arranged around a spacious entrance plaza and surrounded by a large park covering the entire property, in line with the competition's guidelines and subsequent regulations. Conceptually, the complex is organized around three main longitudinal terraced areas characterized by dominant materials.

For the exterior carpentry, an aluminum carpentry line based on the Royal S 50 N System from the company Schüco Internacional KG was adapted, whose profiles were extruded by MDT Aluminio y Vidrio Argentina, complying with the high quality standards required by the German company.

== See also ==
- List of tallest buildings in Argentina
- List of tallest buildings in Buenos Aires
- List of tallest buildings in South America

== Gallery ==
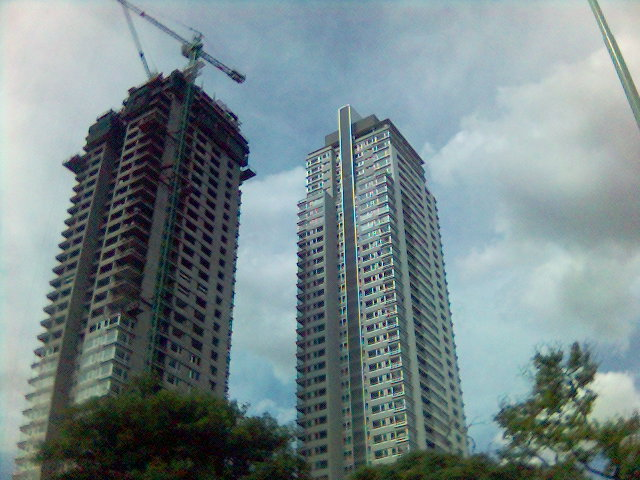
Torre del Parque under construction in 2006

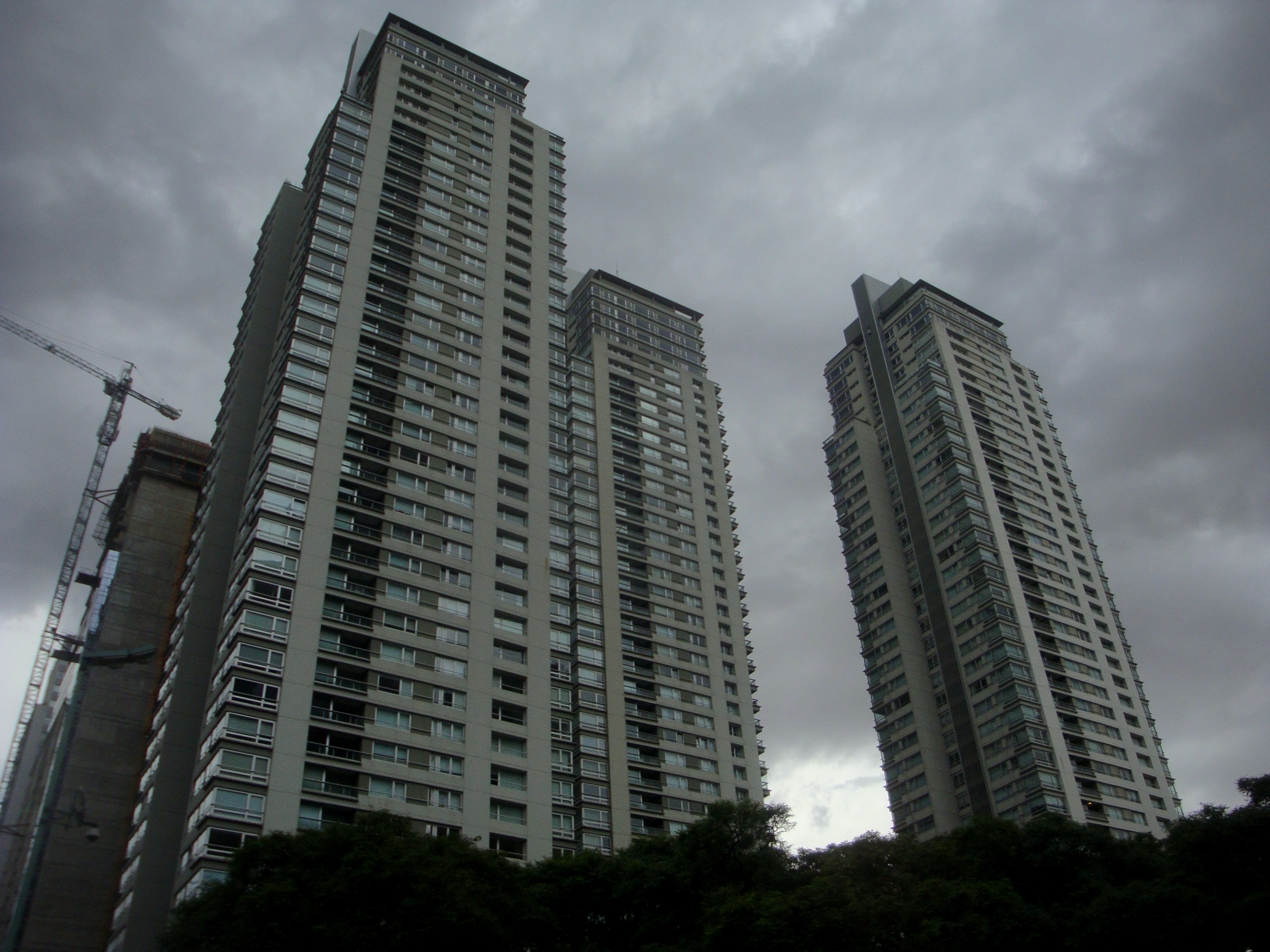
The three towers in 2013
