= List of firsts in architecture =

== Buildings firsts sorted by date built ==
- Oriel Chambers, the first building to feature a metal-framed glass curtain wall. Built in 1864.
- Equitable Life Building (Manhattan), first office building to use passenger elevators. Completed in 1870.
- Home Insurance Building, widely considered to be the first true skyscraper due to its use of a structural steel frame. Built in 1884.
- Pioneer Building, was the tallest building west of Chicago, surpassing St. Paul's previous tallest, the Globe Building when it was completed in 1889. Also early home of Minnesota's first newspaper, now known as the Pioneer Press, and home of the world's first telephone answering service, implemented in 1927
- Hamilton Building, first building in Portland designed in the Classical Revival style, completed in 1893
- Missouri State Teachers Association Building, first building in the United States built specifically to house a state teachers association built in 1927
- Roy G. Cullen Building, first building on a campus of higher education in the United States with air conditioning, built in 1938
- Man Yee Building, first building in Hong Kong with escalators, built in 1957.
- Greystone Manor, the first condominium in the Continental United States was built in Salt Lake City, Utahn by attorney Keith B. Romney built In 1960
- P2 (panel building), type of residential panel building found in former East Germany, first building of this type was built in 1961
- Turning Torso, the first twisted skyscraper in the world, built in 2005.

== Architect firsts ==
- John S. Chase, in 1952, became the first African American to enroll and graduate from the University of Texas at Austin School of Architecture and later became the first African American male licensed to practice Architecture in the state of Texas. In addition, he was also the first African American admitted to the Texas Society of Architects and the Houston Chapter of the American Institute of Architects (AIA). In 1970 John S. Chase became the first African American Architect to serve on the United States Commission on Fine Arts and in 1970, he co-founded the National Organization of Minority Architects (NOMA), (along with 12 other black architects).
