= Alas Building =

Coordinates: 34°35′57″S 58°22′14.1″W

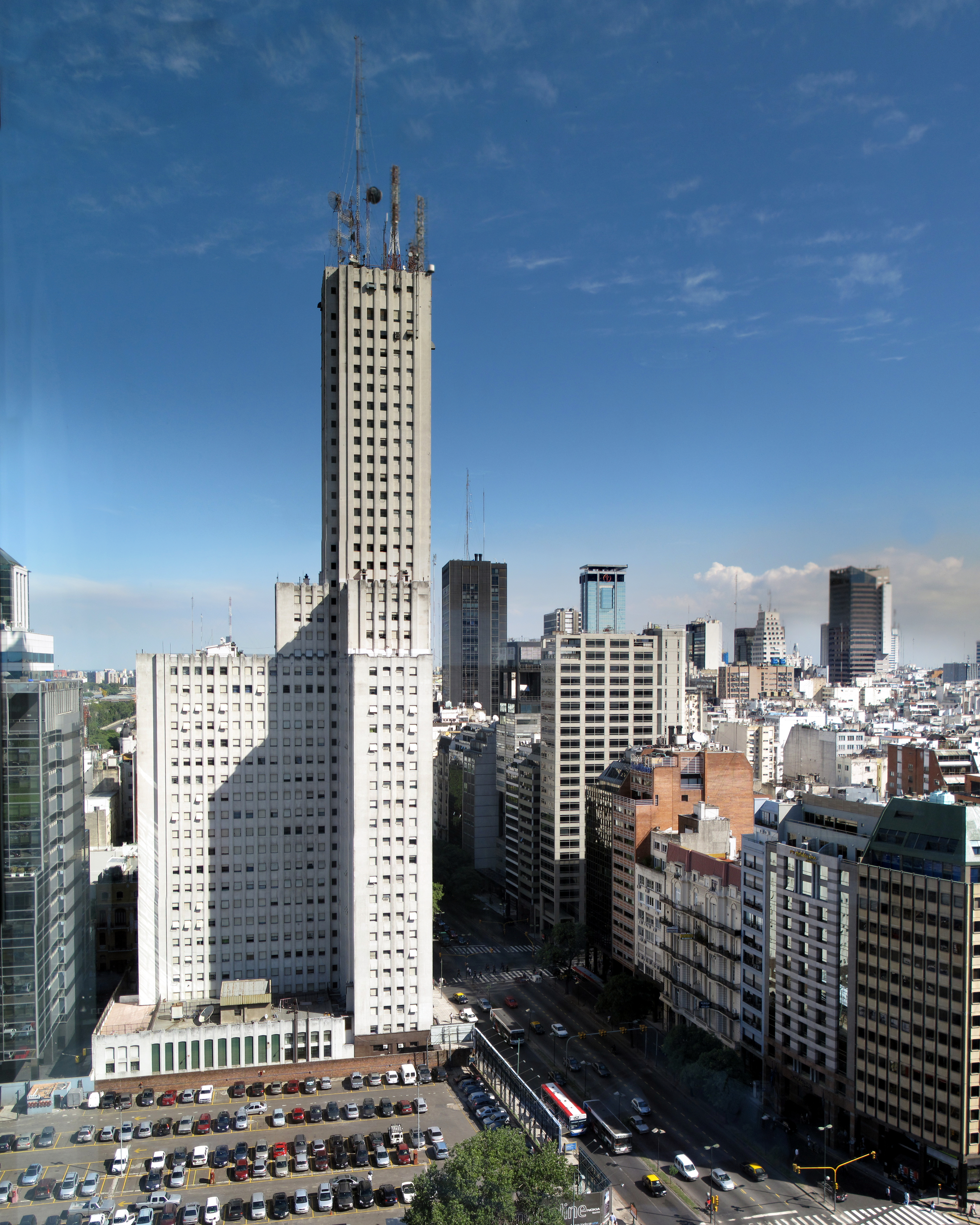
- Interactive map of the Alas Building area

General information
- Status: Completed
- Type: Office; Residential
- Location: Buenos Aires, Argentina
- Construction started: 1951
- Completed: 1957

Height
- Antenna spire: 185 m (607 ft)
- Roof: 141 m (463 ft)

Technical details
- Floor count: 42
- Floor area: 99,000 m^{2} (1,070,000 sq ft)

Design and construction
- Developer: Agrupación de Trabajadores Latinoamericanos Sindicalizados S.A. (ATLAS)

The Alas Building (Spanish: Edificio Alas) is a Rationalist residential and office building in the San Nicolás section of Buenos Aires, Argentina. It is 141 metres (463 ft) high with 41 floors. Alas was the tallest building in Buenos Aires between 1955 and 1995, when it was surpassed by the Le Parc tower. It has long been part of the skyline of Buenos Aires. As of 2009, it was the 20th tallest building in Argentina.

The building was commissioned in 1950 by President Juan Perón for the Association of Unionized Latin American Workers (ATLAS, S.A.). He ordered that plans include an underground bunker for use in case of war or a coup d'état. Perón, however, did not seek refuge there during the 16 June 1955 bombing of Plaza de Mayo by the Argentine Navy. The building was transferred to the Argentine Air Force after the 1955 coup and renamed ALAS ("wings") and the bunker was later converted into Argentine Public Television studios. These were relocated to Figueroa Alcorta Avenue in 1978. Two underground floors are occupied by parking spaces, a gym, the boiler room, bike racks and other amenities.
