= Alvear Tower =

Skyscraper in Buenos Aires, Argentina

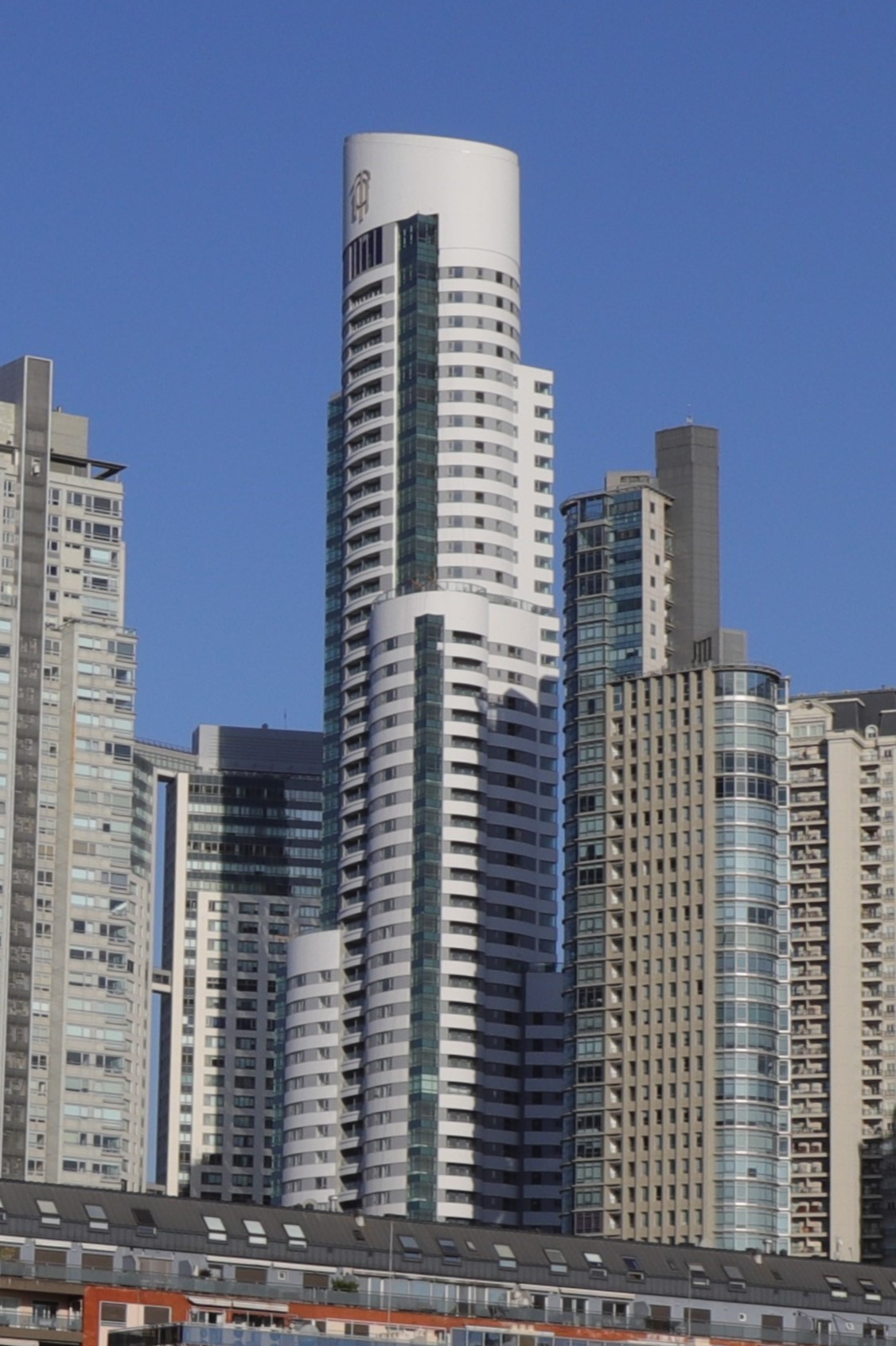
- The Alvear Tower in 2023

General information
- Status: Completed
- Location: Azucena Villaflor 559; Buenos Aires, Argentina
- Coordinates: 34°36′44″S 58°21′37″W
- Construction started: March 2012
- Completed: 2017

Height
- Antenna spire: 239 m (784 ft)
- Roof: 235 m (771 ft)
- Top floor: 230.4 m (756 ft)

Technical details
- Floor count: 54
- Floor area: 70,000 m^{2} (753,000 sq ft)
- Lifts/elevators: 21

Design and construction
- Architect: Pfeifer-Zurdo

Website
- alveartower.com

The Alvear Tower is a residential and hotel skyscraper on Azucena Villaflor Avenue, east of Dock Two in the upscale Puerto Madero section of Buenos Aires. The skyscraper is the tallest building in Argentina.

A mixed-use development, the 54-story, 70,000 m^{2} (753,000 sq ft) building includes 175 condominiums totalling 34,000 m^{2} (366,000 sq ft), as well as a five star hotel. The building's residential floor plans are notable for their variety—ranging from 100 m (330 ft) to 500 m (1,600 ft)—, as well as their 3.3 m (11 ft) ceilings.

== Construction ==
Development took place on a 7,000 m^{2} (75,300 sq ft) lot sold by Grupo Château (the local builders of the neighboring Château Puerto Madero Residence) for US$35 million to Madrid-based developer Rayet for the construction of the Hotel Único Buenos Aires. Originally scheduled to open at the end of 2010, the Hotel Único project was canceled. Rayet sold the lot to Anglo-Argentine developer, David Sutton, the proprietor of the Alvear Palace Hotel, on 5 March 2010.

The construction of the Alvear Tower started in March 2012 and was completed in 2017. The skyscraper is budgeted at US$130 million.

== See also ==
- List of tallest buildings in Argentina
- List of tallest buildings in South America
