= Renoir Towers =

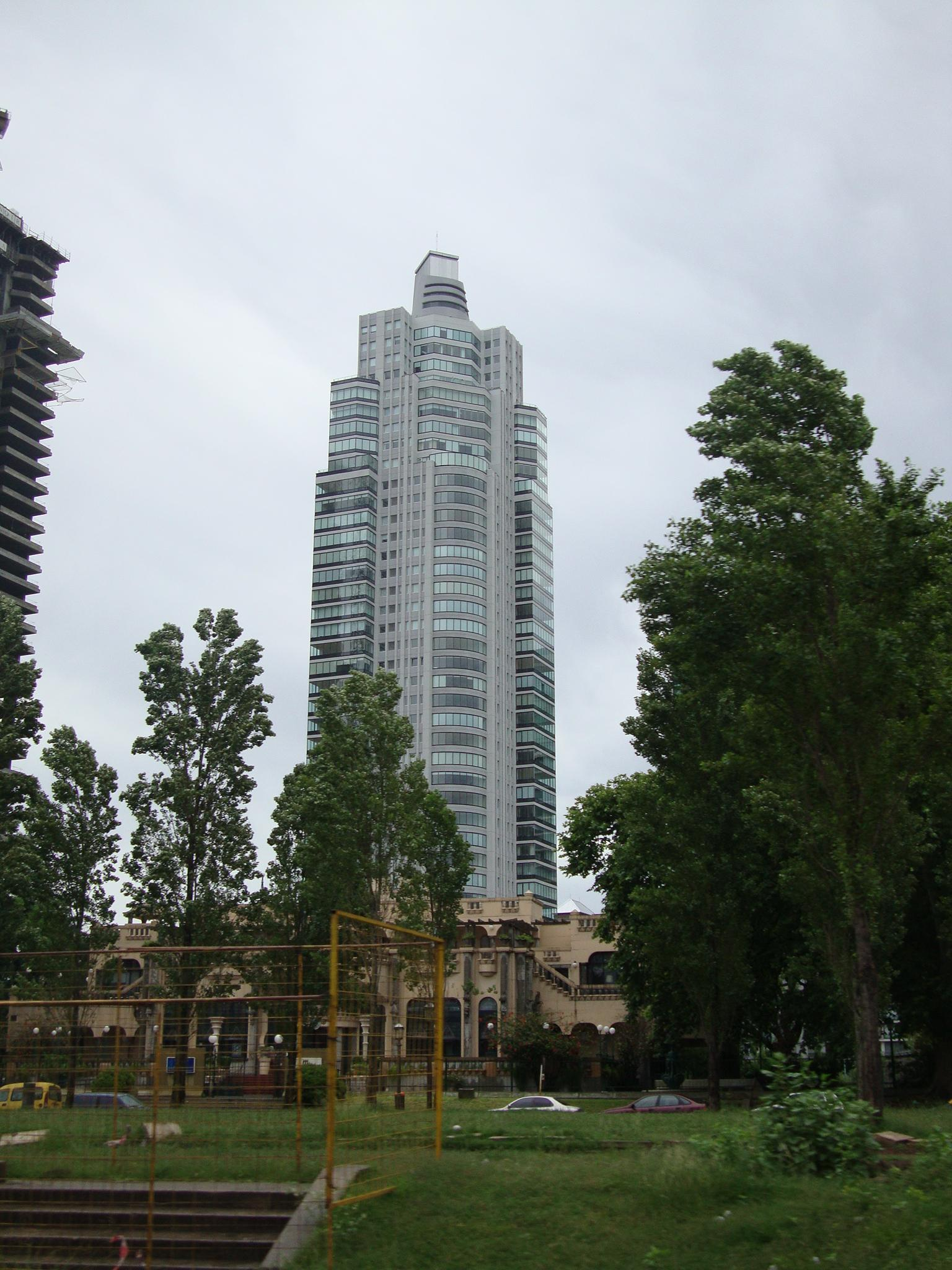
- Renoir Towers: Renoir One
- Interactive map of the Renoir Towers area

General information
- Type: Residential
- Location: Puerto Madero, Buenos Aires, Argentina
- Coordinates: 34°36′37″S 58°21′40″W
- Construction started: October 2, 2007
- Completed: 2013; 13 years ago

Height
- Roof: 175m and 136m

Technical details
- Floor count: 51 and 41

Design and construction
- Architects: Robirosa, Beccar, Varela, Pasinato arquitectos
- Developer: DYPSA
- Main contractor: Constructora Sudamericana S.A

The Renoir Towers (Renoir Residences Height) are two residential towers in the Puerto Madero neighborhood of Buenos Aires, Argentina.

The Renoir One Tower is 136 m (446 ft) tall and has 41 floors and The Renoir Two Tower is 175 m (574 ft) tall with 51 floors. The complex was actually planned to be the tallest towers in Puerto Madero and Buenos Aires; but in 2007, work began on the Cavia Tower (from the Le Parc Figueroa Alcorta complex), which became the tallest skyscraper in the city upon completion in 2008.

DYPSA, the project's developers, modified the height of the Renoir Two building, extending it from 171m to 175 m, making the latter tower the tallest in the city upon its 2011 completion.

== Third tower ==
DYPSA had confirmed that a third tower, intended to be a hotel of the Alvear chain and with a different design, would be built in a third lot acquired by the company nearby. However, after the 2008 financial crisis, these plans were scrapped and the project was inaugurated in 2013 with the two completed towers.
