= Mulieris Towers =

Twin towers in Buenos Aires, Argentina

- Torres Mulieris
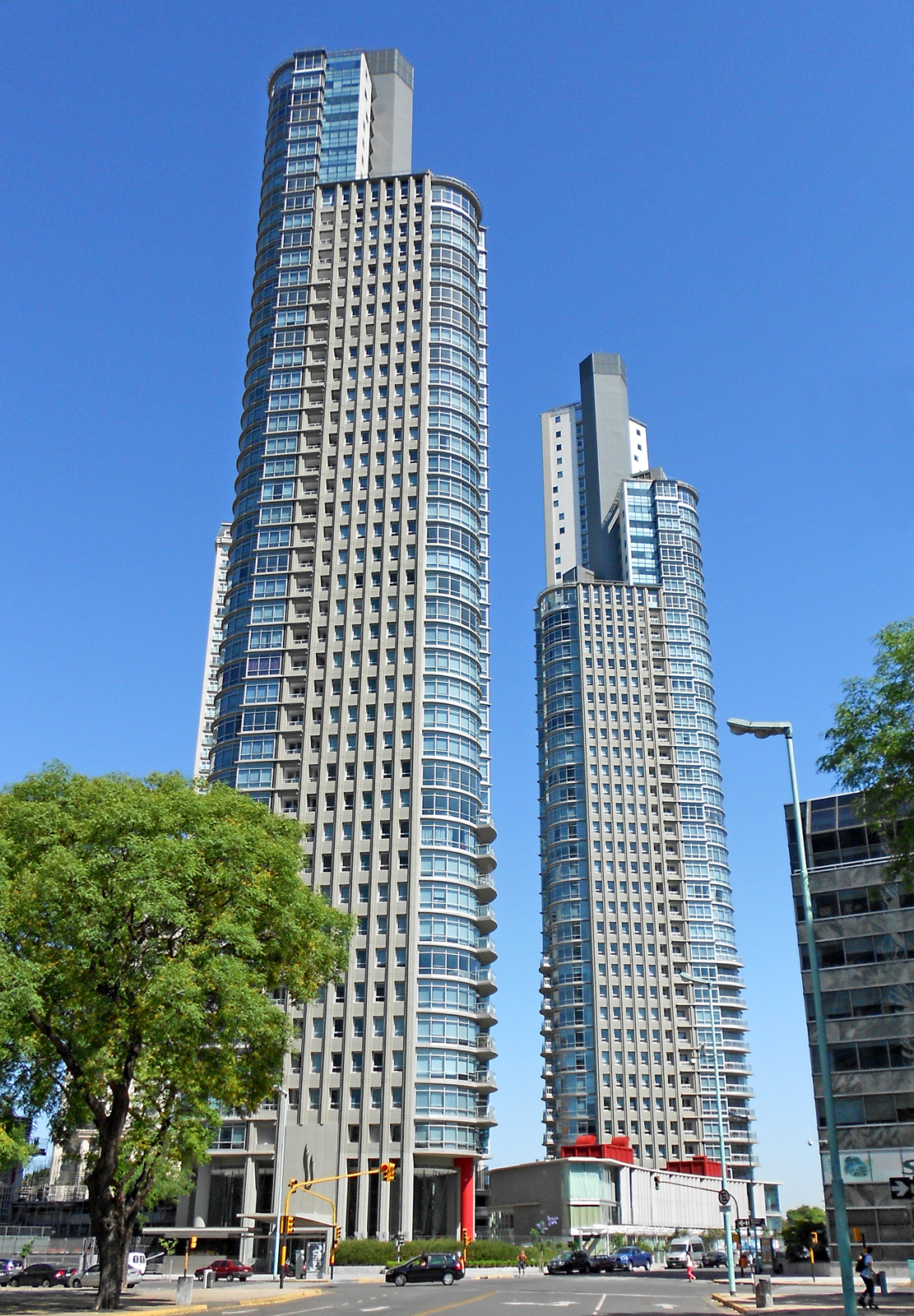
- Interactive map of the Mulieris Towers area

General information
- Status: Completed
- Type: Residential
- Location: Puerto Madero, Buenos Aires, Argentina
- Coordinates: 34°36′46″S 58°21′40″W
- Opening: 2009

Height
- Roof: 161 m

Technical details
- Floor count: 45
- Floor area: 64,800 m^{2} (698,000 sq ft)

Design and construction
- Architect: M/SG/S/S/S
- Developer: Creaurban

Mulieris Towers are two skyscrapers located in the Puerto Madero neighborhood of Buenos Aires, Argentina; each tower rises 161 metres and has 45 floors.

Developed by Creaurban, a unit of the Macri Group, the two residential buildings were built on an area of 6,792 m^{2} and completed in 2009, becoming the fourth-tallest buildings in Argentina. The project's name comes from the Latin mulieris, meaning 'women'.

== See also ==
- List of tallest buildings in Argentina
