= Torre Chateau de Puerto Madero =

Torre Château (Château Tower of Puerto Madero)
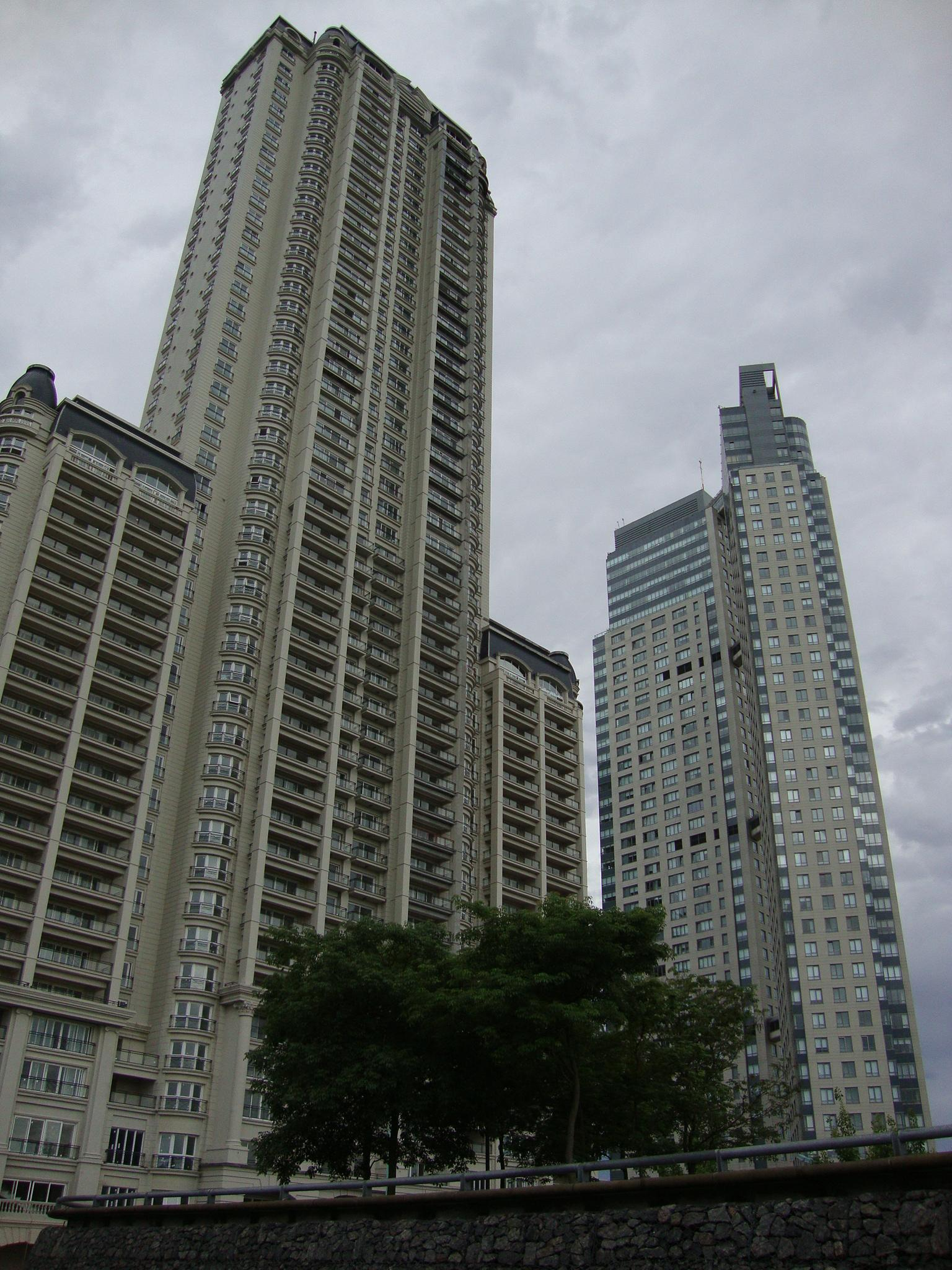
- The Château Tower (left)
- Interactive map of the Torre Château (Château Tower of Puerto Madero) area

General information
- Status: Completed
- Type: Residential
- Location: Azucena Villaflor de Vicenti 300 (1 T); Puerto Madero, Buenos Aires
- Coordinates: 34°36′47″S 58°21′37″W
- Opening: 2010

Height
- Roof: 155.7 m (511 ft)

Technical details
- Floor count: 48
- Floor area: 60,000 m^{2} (650,000 sq ft)

Design and construction
- Developer: Grupo Château; Obras Civiles y Sergio Grosskopf

Torre Château de Puerto Madero is a high-rise residential complex located in the neighborhood of Puerto Madero in Buenos Aires, Argentina.

The development began with the 2006 purchase of two, 7,000 m^{2} (74,000 ft^{2}) lots in the Puerto Madero section by the Château Group, and was originally intended to include two, 48-story residential towers. The group sold the northern lot to the Madrid-based Rayet Group in 2007, however, and instead built the planned second high-rise on Avenida del Libertador (in the Núñez district).

Work on the neo-Second Empire architecture building began promptly, and by early 2009, 75% of its 190 units had been sold; among the premier real estate developments in the city, the sale price ranged from US$330 to US$470 per square foot.
