= Le Parc Tower =

High-rise building in Buenos Aires, Argentina

Coordinates: 34°34′30.6″S 58°25′17.2″W

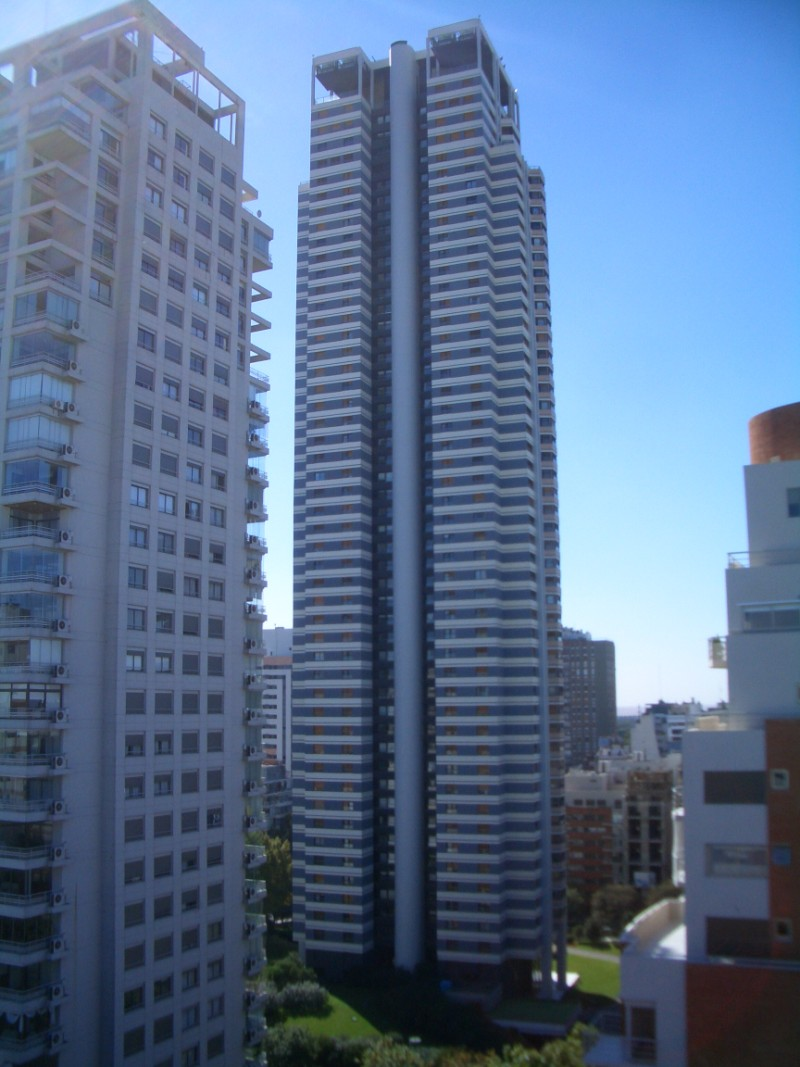
Le Parc Residential Tower

Le Parc Tower is a high-rise building located at the block bounded by Avenida Cerviño, Gody Cruz, Demaria and Fray Justo Santamaria de Oro in the neighborhood of Palermo in Buenos Aires, Argentina.

This luxury residential structure developed between 1991 and 1995 by RAGHSA SA was designed by Mario Roberto Álvarez and Associates. 51 floors and 158 meters (518 feet) tall, it was the tallest residential building in the country between its completion in 1995 and the completion of the first of two El Faro Towers in 2003.
