= YPF Tower =

Office skyscraper in Buenos Aires, Argentina

Coordinates: 34°36′19.6″S 58°21′44.8″W

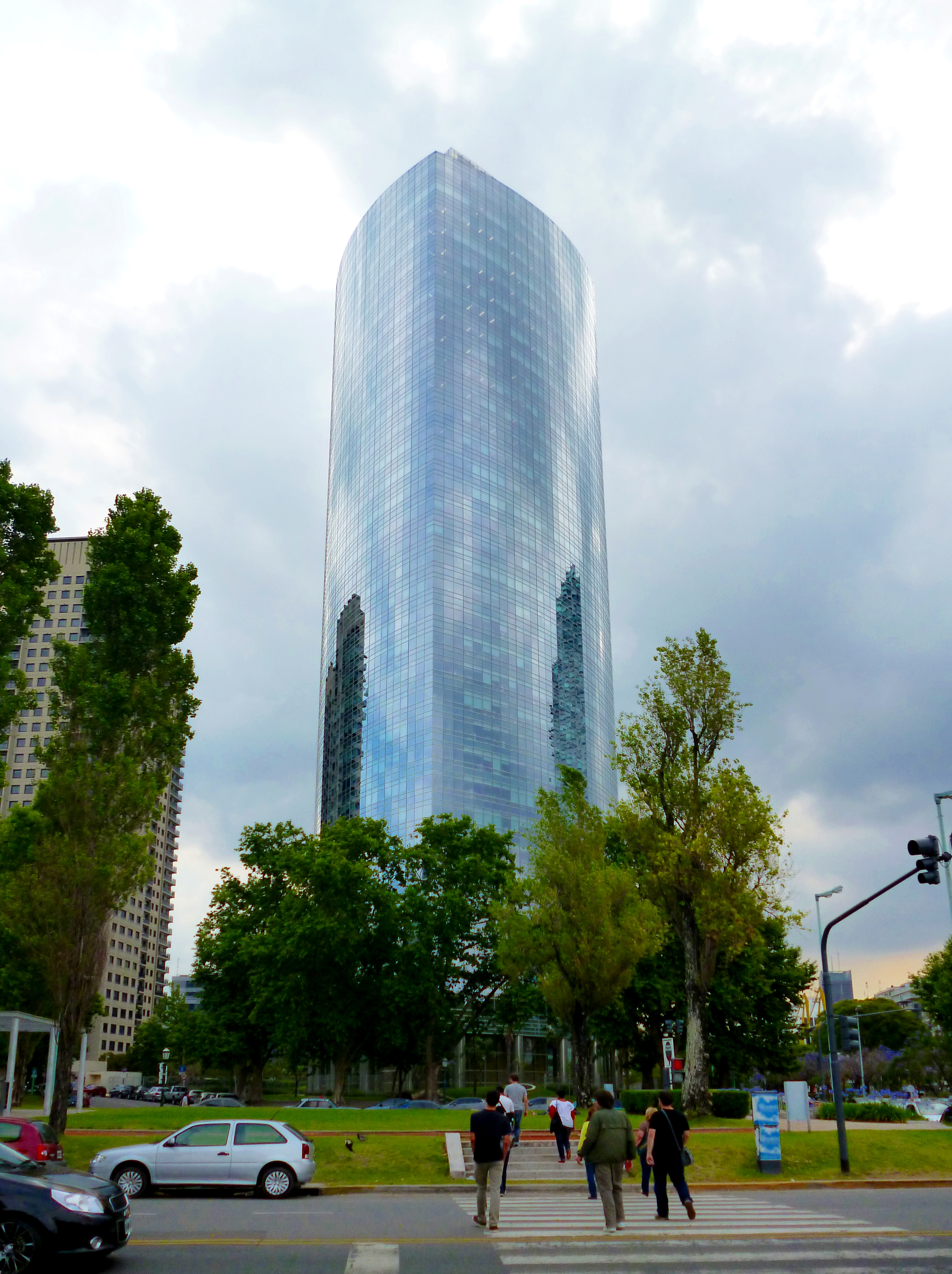

General information
- Status: Completed
- Type: Office
- Location: Macacha Güemes y J. Manso (Parcela 5 L -1y2) Puerto Madero, Buenos Aires, Argentina
- Construction started: 2006
- Inaugurated: August 2008

Height
- Height: 160 m (525 ft)

Technical details
- Floor count: 44
- Floor area: 75,000 m^{2} (810,000 sq ft)

Design and construction
- Architect: César Pelli
- Developer: YPF
- Main contractor: CRIBA

YPF Tower is a corporate high-rise building designed by internationally recognized architect César Pelli and is the headquarters of Argentine national oil company YPF. Construction began in 2005, in the Puerto Madero barrio (district) of Buenos Aires, Argentina and the office building was completed in September 2008. The building is 160 metres (520 ft) tall and has 44 floors. It was, upon completion in 2008, the tallest office building in Argentina, and the third tallest overall. The building is located on the corner of Macacha Güemes and Juana Manso streets, in the Puerto Madero ward.

The building's construction cost an estimated US$134 million. The main contractor in its construction was CRIBA, a leading local contractor founded in 1952 by Alberto Tarasido.

On May 25, 2012, 21 days after the nationalization of YPF by the government of Cristina Fernandez de Kirchner, the YPF Tower was lit in the colors of the Argentine flag as a political statement to commemorate 202 years of self-governance.

As of 2021, following years of hardship, YPF was seeking US$400 million for its sale.
