= Microcentro =

Microcentro may refer to:

- San Nicolás, Buenos Aires
- Buenos Aires Central Business District
