= Buenos Aires Central Business District =

- Unofficial barrio
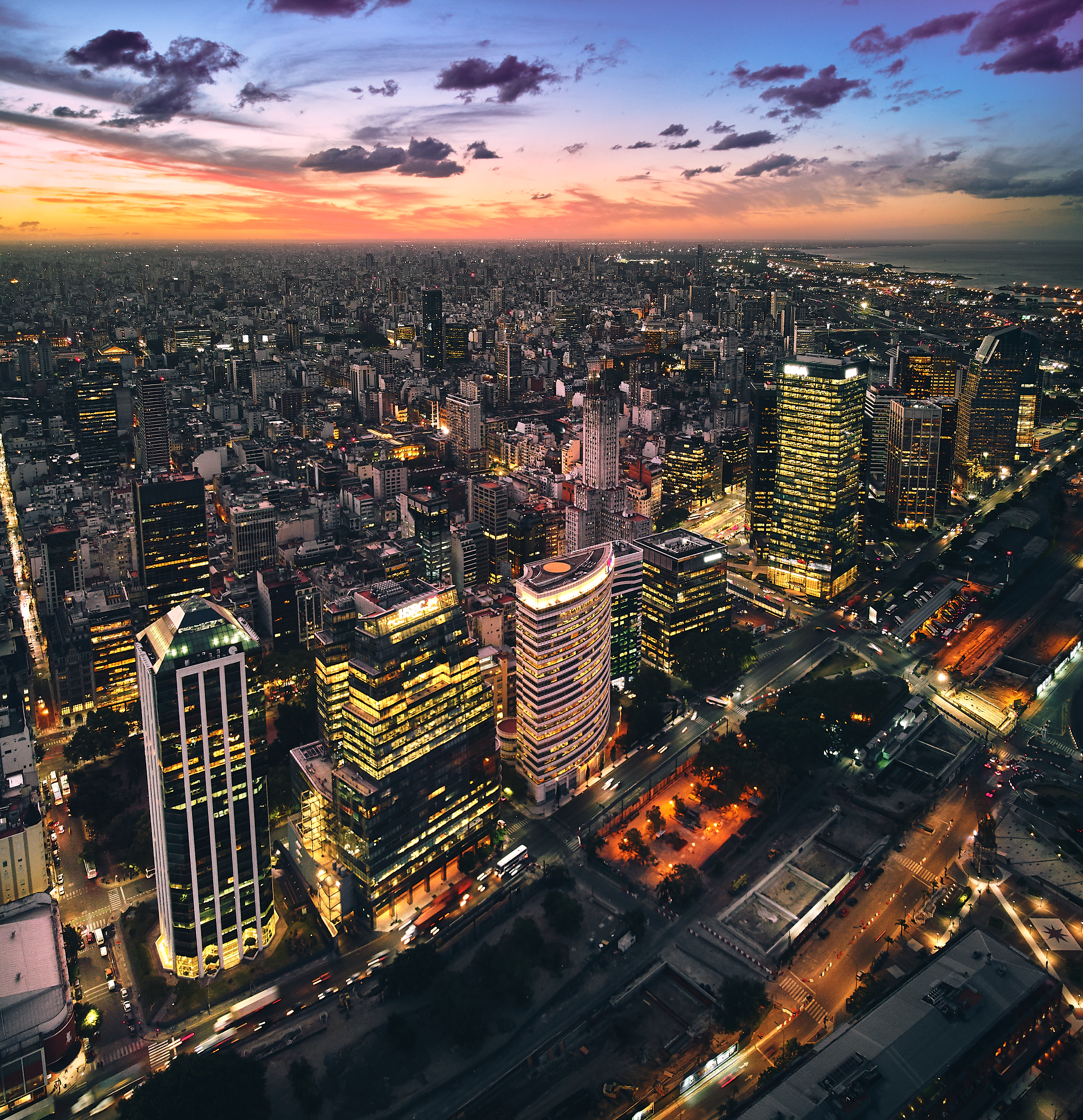
- Aerial view of Buenos Aires' central business district

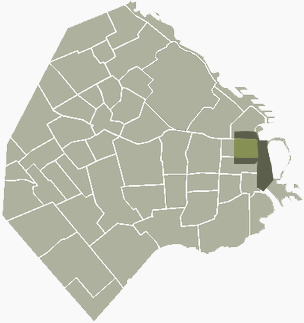
- Location of the CBD (light and dark green) and the Microcenter (light green) within Buenos Aires.
- Coordinates: 34°36′14″S 58°22′14″W
- Country: Argentina
- Autonomous City: Buenos Aires
- Comuna: C1

Population
  - Total: 20,000
- Time zone: UTC-3 (ART)

The Buenos Aires Central Business District is the main commercial centre of Buenos Aires, Argentina, though not an official city ward. While the barrios of Puerto Madero and Retiro house important business complexes and modern high-rise architecture, the area traditionally known as Microcentro (Spanish: Microcenter) is located within San Nicolás and Monserrat, roughly coinciding with the area around the historic center of the Plaza de Mayo. The Microcentro has a wide concentration of offices, service companies and banks, and a large circulation of pedestrians on working days. Another name given to this unofficial barrio is La City, which refers more precisely to an even smaller sector within the Microcentro, where almost all the banking headquarters of the country are concentrated.

== Overview ==
The area was the site of the first European settlement in what later became Buenos Aires. Its south–north axis runs along Leandro Alem Avenue, from Belgrano Avenue in the south to Retiro railway station in the north, and its east–west axis runs from the Buenos Aires Ecological Reserve to Ninth of July Avenue. The district is centered around the San Nicolás ward, and includes the northern section of Montserrat, the section of Retiro south of Santa Fe Avenue, and the section of Puerto Madero west of the Buenos Aires Docklands.

The district is the financial, corporate, and cultural hub of Buenos Aires, and of Argentina. The economy of Buenos Aires was the 13th largest among the world's cities in 2006 at US$245 billion in purchasing power parity, which, based on the population of that year, translates into US21,500 per capita. The Buenos Aires Human Development Index (0.925 in 1998) is likewise high by international standards. The Port of Buenos Aires is one of the busiest in South America; navigable rivers by way of the Río de la Plata connect the port to northeastern Argentina, Brazil, Uruguay and Paraguay. As a result, it serves as the distribution hub for a vast area of the south-eastern region of the South American continent. Tax collection related to the port has caused many political problems in the past.

== Geography ==
Buenos Aires CBD lies in the Pampa region, except some zones like the Buenos Aires Ecological Reserve, the Boca Juniors (football) Club "sports city", Jorge Newbery Airport, the Puerto Madero neighborhood and the main port itself. These latter were all built on reclaimed land along the coast of the Rio de la Plata (the world's largest estuary).

The region was formerly crossed by different creeks and lagoons, some of which were refilled and other tubed. Among the most important creeks are: Maldonado, Vega, Medrano, Cildañez and White. In 1908 many creeks were channeled and rectified, as floods were damaging the city's infrastructure. Starting in 1919, most creeks were enclosed. Notably, the Maldonado was tubed in 1954, and currently runs below Juan B. Justo Avenue (north of this district).

Facing the Río de la Plata estuary, the frontage remained flood-prone, and in 1846, Governor Juan Manuel de Rosas had a contention wall six blocks long built along the existing promenade. An English Argentine investor, Edward Taylor, opened a pier along the promenade in 1855, and the flood-control walls were extended northwards to Recoleta, and south to San Telmo, in subsequent works completed in 1865.

A sudden economic and population boom led the new President of Argentina, Julio Roca, to commission the development in 1881 of an ambitious port to supplement the recently developed facilities at La Boca, in Buenos Aires's southside. Approved by the Argentine Congress in 1882 and financed by the prominent London-based Barings Bank (the chief underwriter of Argentine bonds and investment, at the time), the project required the reclaiming of over 200 hectares (500 acres) of underwater land and was accompanied by the widening of the promenade into what became Leandro Alem Avenue.

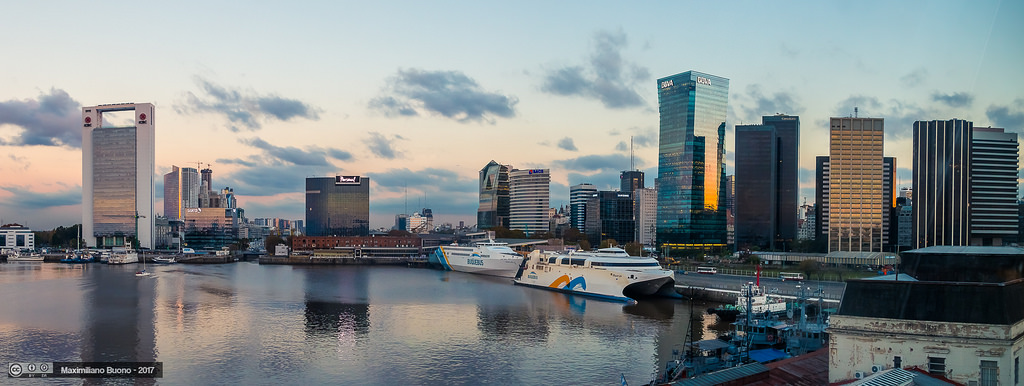
Panoramic view of the Buenos Aires Central Business District in Retiro, also known as Catalinas Norte.

== Architecture ==
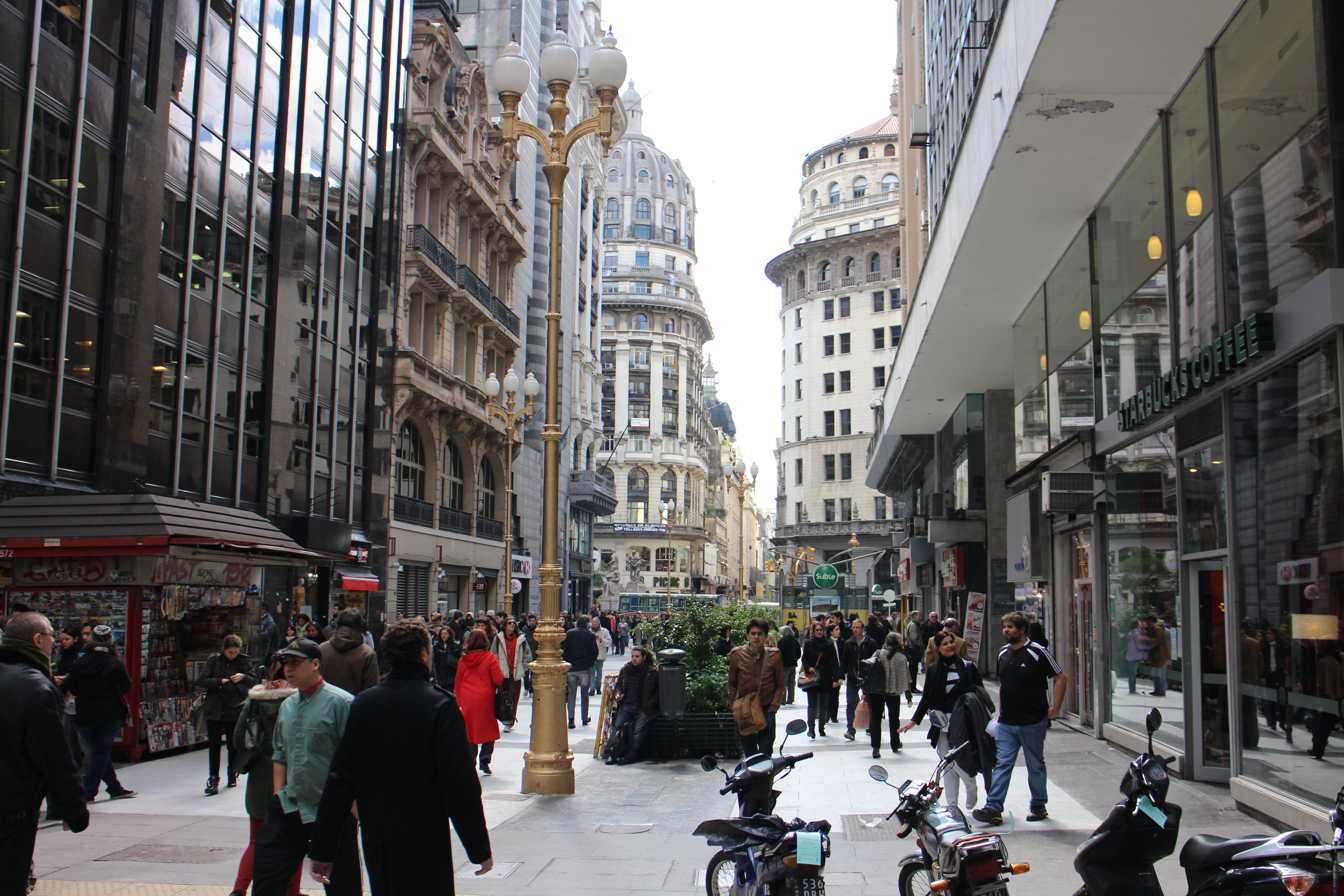
Near the corner of Florida street and the Diagonal Norte thoroughfare, featuring several styles of architecture.

Italian and French influences increased after the overthrow of strongman Juan Manuel de Rosas in 1852, and particularly upon the advent of the modernizing Generation of 1880. French architecture inspired the area's redevelopment during the beginning of the 20th century, and eclectic designs that drew from Beaux-Arts, French Academy, and Second Empire architecture were reflected by numerous historic buildings in this districts from the era, notably the headquarters for La Prensa, City Hall, the City Legislature, Buenos Aires Customs, Palace of Justice, the National Congress, the Teatro Colón, the Buenos Aires Stock Exchange, the Buenos Aires Central Post Office, and along most of the Avenida de Mayo and Diagonal Norte Avenue. Some of the most prominent contributors to the district's architecture from the era included Francesco Tamburini, Vittorio Meano, Julio Dormal, Virginio Colombo, Juan Antonio Buschiazzo, Mario Palanti, and Francisco Gianotti. Later significant additions include those by Alejandro Christophersen, Alejandro Bustillo (most notably the National Bank), Andrés Kalnay, Eduardo Le Monnier, and Francisco Salamone.

The Alas Building, commissioned by Juan Perón and built in the early 1950s, was the tallest in Argentina until 1995, and was one of numerous commercial structures built in the Rationalist style in this area during that time. Since the 1960s, newer, high-technology buildings were designed in the district by Argentine architects Clorindo Testa, Santiago Sánchez Elía, César Pelli, and Mario Roberto Álvarez, by firms such as SEPRA Arquitectos and MSGSSS, and by Uruguayan architect Rafael Viñoly. Some of the more notable commercial developments completed since then have included the Catalinas Norte office park, Torre Bouchard, Bouchard Plaza, Galicia Tower, the Repsol-YPF Tower, the Banco Macro Tower, and the BBVA Tower.

== Districts ==
=== San Nicolás ===
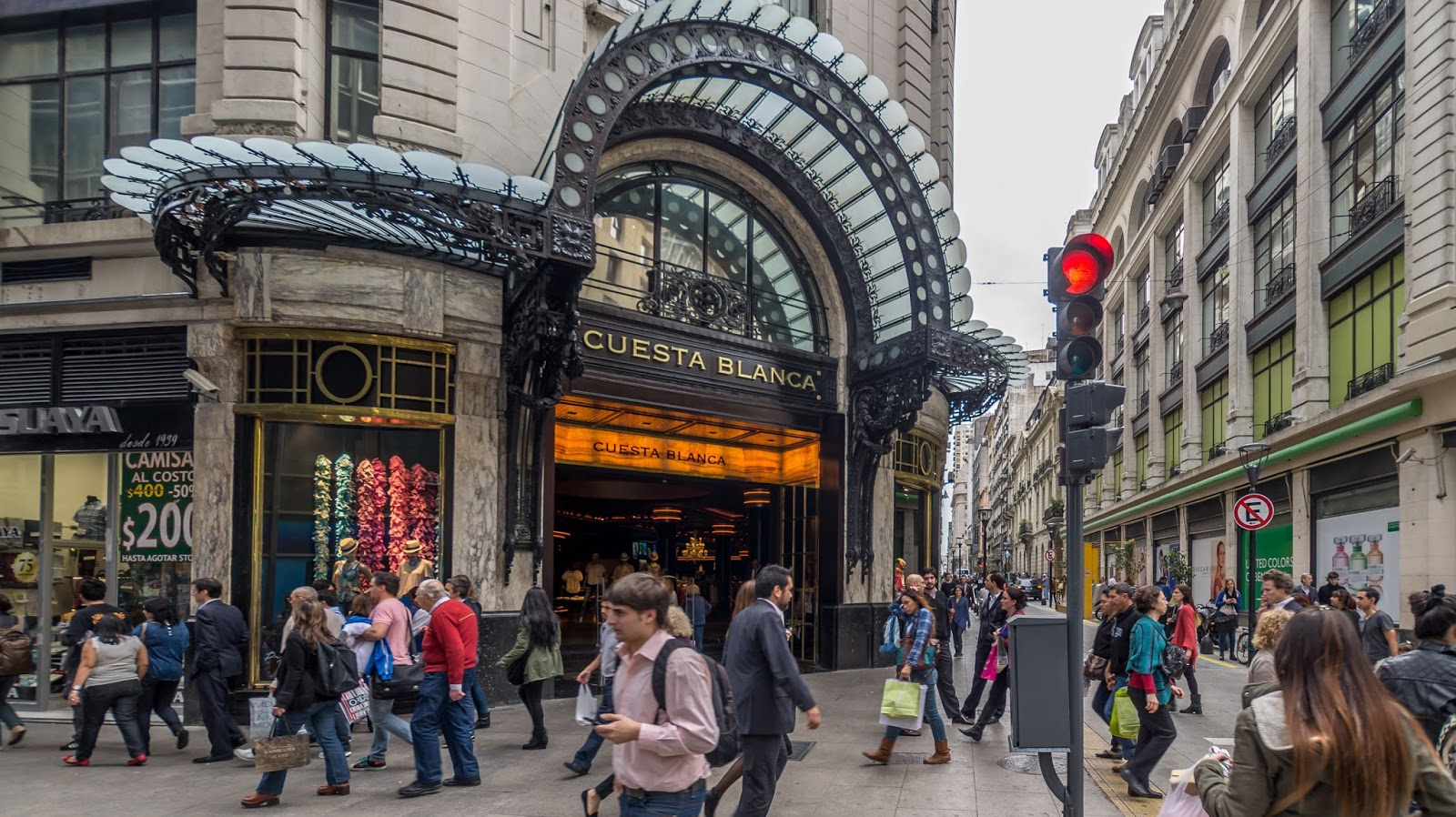
A representative image of pedestrians at the Microcentro

San Nicolás is one of the districts that shares most of the city and national government structure with neighboring Montserrat, and is home of the business district's financial center. It's seldom referred to as San Nicolás, but usually as The Center ("City Centre"), and the part east of the 9 de Julio Avenue is called Microcentro ("Micro-centre").

The growing importance of the area as a financial center was highlighted by the 1854 establishment of the Buenos Aires Stock Exchange. San Nicolás remains the financial center of Argentina, something underscored by the presence of the Central Bank and the National Bank, Argentina's largest. The rapid development of the Argentine economy after 1875 made itself evident in San Nicolás with the reclaiming of riverfront land by businessmen Francisco Seeber and Eduardo Madero, and the shore hitherto popular among washerwomen became the Paseo de Julio (today Leandro Alem Avenue).

The construction of Corrientes and Nueve de Julio Avenues in the 1930s further modernized San Nicolás, which had hitherto been limited in its development by its colonial grid of narrow streets. Florida Street, most of which is in San Nicolás, is the city's best-known pedestrianized street. Its most discernible landmark is the Galerías Pacífico shopping arcade.

The district is home to the Argentine Supreme Court, the Buenos Aires Metropolitan Cathedral, the Colón Opera House, headquarters of numerous leading Argentine firms, including Aerolíneas Argentinas, the Bank of the City of Buenos Aires, La Nación, Bunge y Born, Pérez Companc, the Macri Group, and most of the Buenos Aires Stock Exchange leaders, as well as the local offices of a number of international companies, such as BankBoston, BBVA, Citibank, Deutsche Bank, HSBC, IBM, Microsoft, Santander Bank, and Techint.

=== Retiro ===
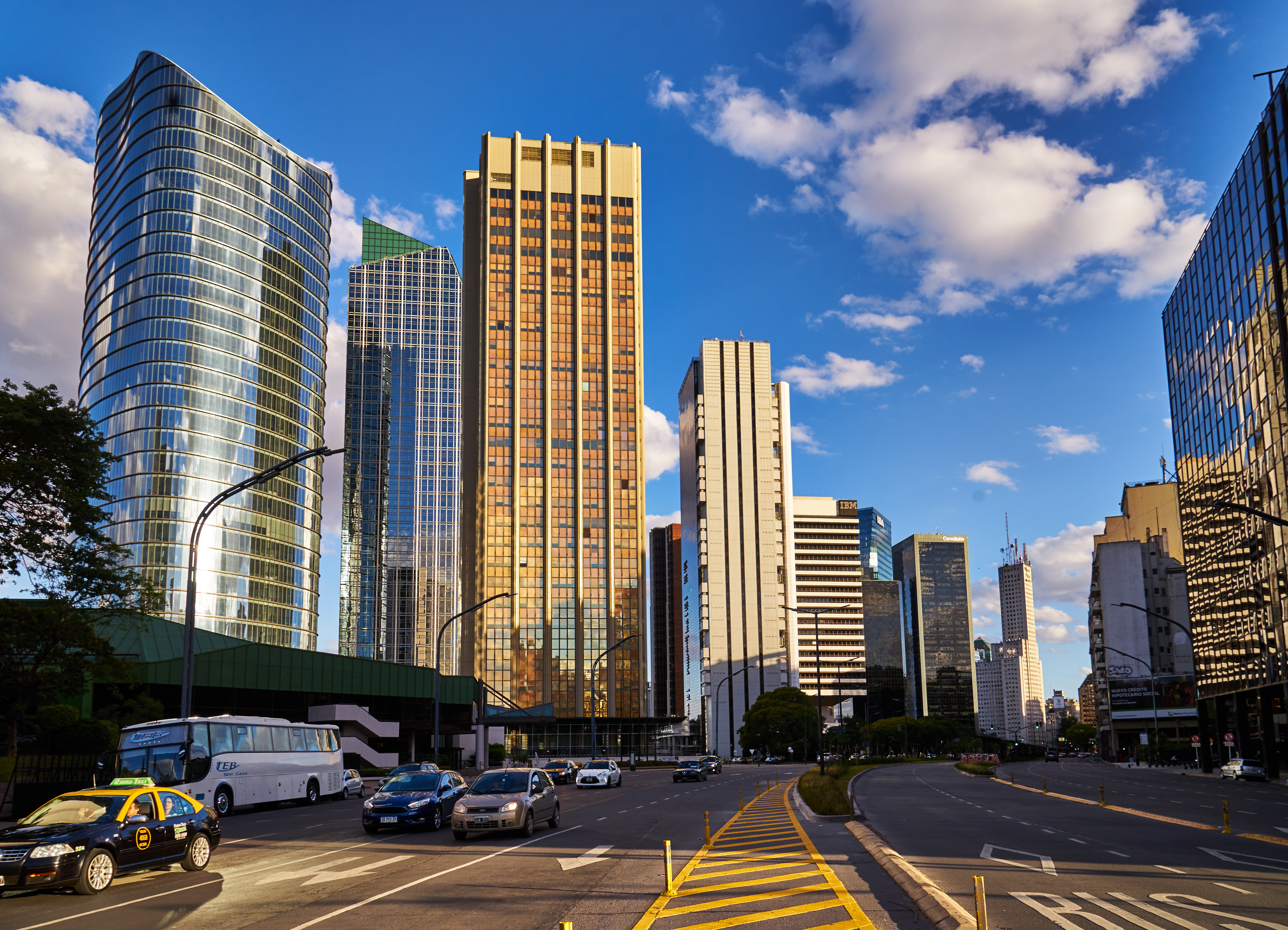
The Avenida Leandro N. Alem in Retiro, featuring the Catalinas Norte business complex.

Retiro is one of the largest hubs of transportation services in Argentina. Local and long-distance rail service heading to the north originate from Estación Retiro (Retiro Terminal Station), and Retiro bus station is the city's main long-distance bus terminal. Subte line C of the Buenos Aires Metro system and numerous local public bus services serve Retiro, and this area is always teeming with commuters and traffic on weekdays.

The most important avenue linking Retiro and the CBD to commuters living in residential areas to the north is Avenida del Libertador, which becomes Leandro Alem Avenue past the Retiro Station. Other important thoroughfares in the Retiro section of the CBD are Córdoba, Santa Fe, and 9 de Julio Avenues.

The high-rise business district of Catalinas Norte, as well as the northern end of the Puerto Madero development, is located east of Leandro N. Alem Avenue. Opposite the Retiro train terminal, at the northern end of the CBD, is the leafy Plaza San Martín, surrounded by great palaces and hotels. The Retiro lowlands were once the training grounds for José de San Martín's Granaderos corps, and the modern-day Plaza San Martín features an equestrian statue honoring the hero of the Argentine War of Independence, as well as a memorial for the dead in the 1982 Falklands War. Facing the station is Argentine Air Force Square, where the Torre Monumental (formerly Torre de los Ingleses), a monument donated by the Anglo-Argentine community for the 1910 centennial celebrations, is located.

Other significant landmarks opposite the Plaza are the Kavanagh Building, a reinforced concrete structure that when completed in 1936, was the tallest building in Latin America at 120 metres (394 ft). The nearby Brunetta Building (formerly headquarters for Olivetti's Latin American operations) was the first in Argentina to be built in the International style.

=== Montserrat ===
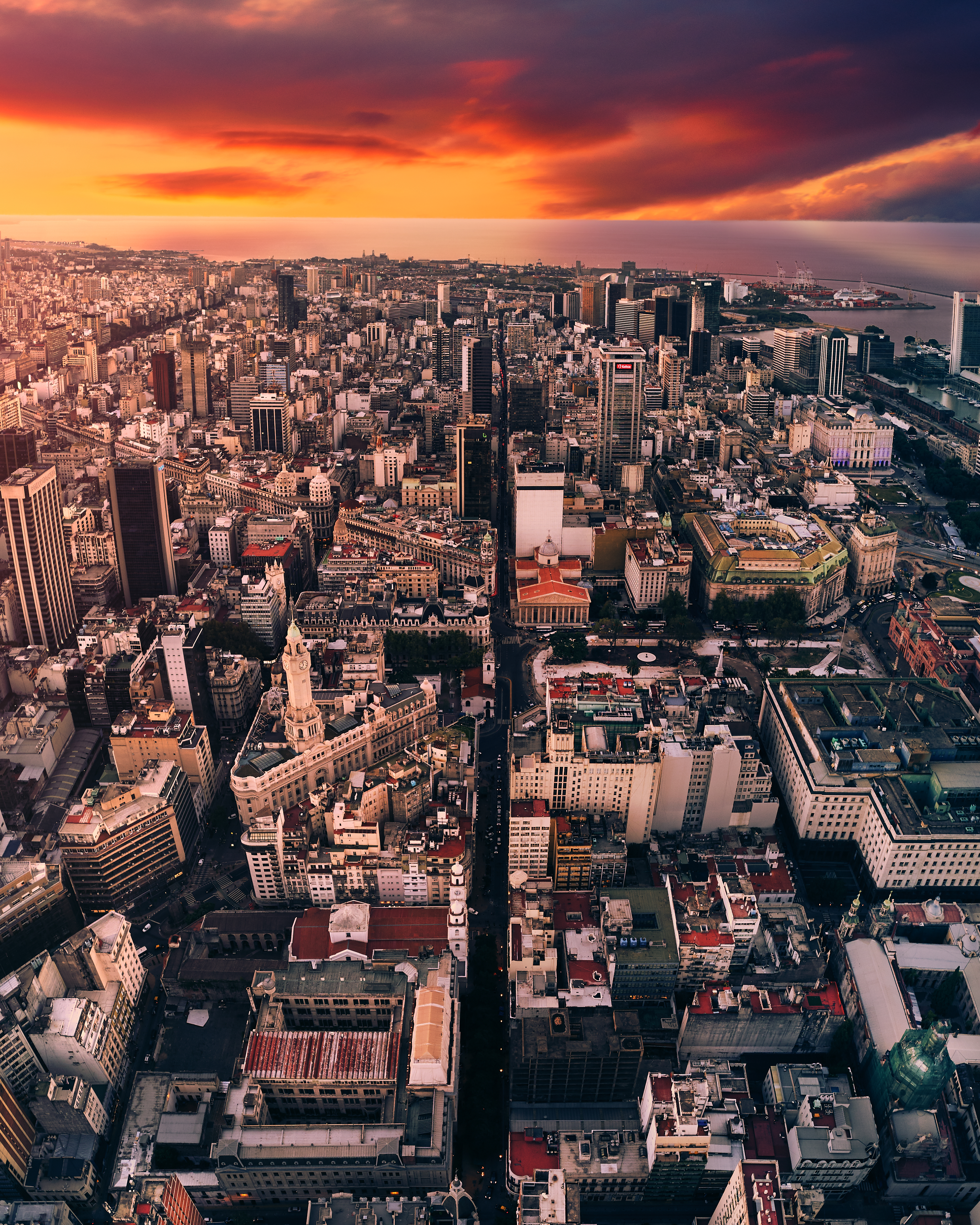
Aerial view of the city's historical centre, in the borough of Monserrat.

Montserrat is located south of San Nicolás. The section of the Montserrat ward within the business district includes some of the most important buildings in Argentine Government and history, and was the site of the Buenos Aires Cabildo, the colonial town hall.

Avenue of May runs through the Montserrat district, connecting May Square and Congressional Plaza. A block or two south of the Plaza de Mayo, the older section of Montserrat begins. This was the location of the Illuminated Block, a Jesuit center of higher learning during the 18th century, and today home to the Colegio Nacional de Buenos Aires. This is Buenos Aires's oldest neighborhood and even today, very little of the cityscape there is less than a hundred years old (except along Belgrano Avenue), thereby making a nearly seamless transition to the likewise historic San Telmo district to the south.

The district's led central location and its presence therein of much of Argentina's governmental structure led to monumental construction over the 1910s, notable among which are the Pink House, City Hall, the City Legislature, the Customs building, the offices of La Prensa (today the Buenos Aires House of Culture), the art-deco NH City Hotel (off the Plaza de Mayo), the Libertador Building (Ministry of Defense), and South Diagonal Avenue. Montserrat's western half was partitioned from the rest by the southward expansion of the massive Nueve de Julio Avenue around 1950.

The area became a largely bohemian quarter popular with tango performers and artists, as well as many who preferred the area's close proximity to the growing financial district to the north and its relatively low rent scale. Its rich architectural history and quiet, narrow streets have, as in neighboring San Telmo, helped lead to renewed tourist interest in Montserrat since around 1990.

=== Puerto Madero ===
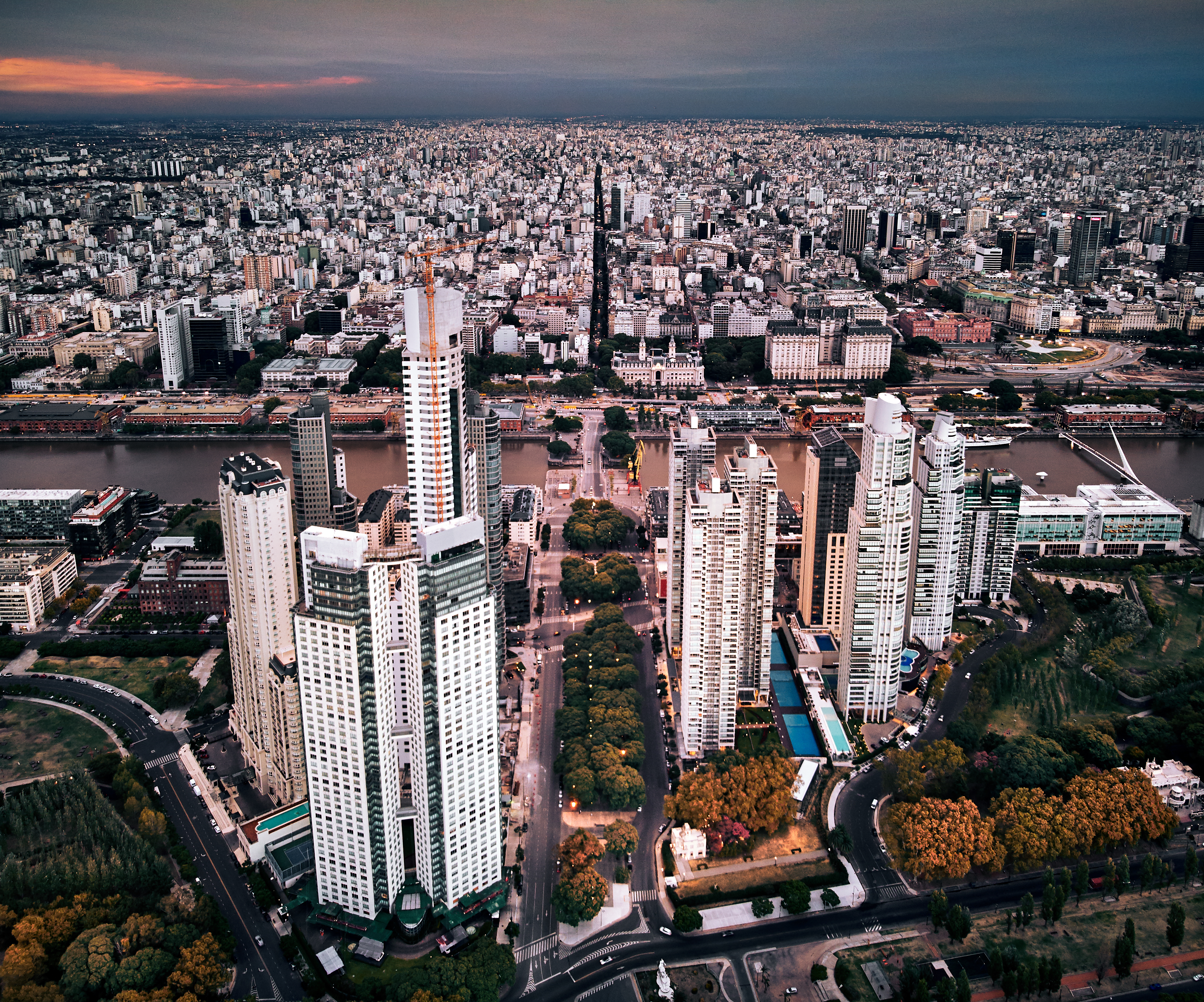
High-rise buildings in Puerto Madero

Puerto Madero occupies a significant portion of the docklands and, as the newest of Buenos Aires's 48 boroughs, features the latest architectural trends in Argentina, as well as many tall apartment buildings and office blocks.

Originally developed by local businessman Eduardo Madero and designed by British engineer Sir John Hawkshaw, Puerto Madero was inaugurated in 1897. Its four docks were relegated to ancillary port functions after the 1926 completion of the New Port to the north, however, and became derelict. Beginning around 1994, however, local and foreign investment led to a massive revitalization effort, recycling and refurbishing the west side warehouses into upscale offices, lofts, restaurants, private universities and luxurious hotels. State-of-the-art multiplex cinemas, theatres, cultural centres, luxurious hotels and office and corporate buildings are located mostly in the eastern side of the district.

Puerto Madero has been redeveloped with international flair, drawing interest from renown architects such as Santiago Calatrava, Norman Foster, César Pelli and Philippe Starck, among others. Today one of the trendiest boroughs in Buenos Aires, it has become the preferred address for growing numbers of young professionals and retirees, alike. Increasing property prices have also generated interest in the area as a destination for foreign buyers, particularly those in the market for premium investment properties.

The neighborhood's road network has been entirely rebuilt, especially in the east side. The layout of the east side consists currently of three wide boulevards running east–west crossed by the east side's main street, Juana Manso Avenue. The layout is completed with some other avenues and minor streets, running both east–west and north–south, and by several pedestrianised streets. All the streets of Puerto Madero are named after women. The Puente de la Mujer (Women's Bridge), designed in 2001 by Spanish architect Santiago Calatrava, is the newest link between the east and west docks of Puerto Madero.

Puerto Madero represents the largest wide-scale urban project in the city of Buenos Aires, currently. Having undergone an impressive revival in merely a decade, it is one of the most successful recent waterfront renewal projects in the world.

Numerous new residential high-rises of up to 50 stories have been built facing on the eastern half of Puerto Madero since 2000. These include El Mirador of Puerto Madero Towers, Renoir Towers, El Faro Towers, Chateau Tower of Puerto Madero, and the Mulieris Towers, among others. Notable non-residential structures include the Repsol-YPF Tower, the Hilton Buenos Aires, the Faena Hotel+Universe (one of a number of refurbished former Molinos Río de la Plata silos), and the Fortabat Art Collection museum building.
