= ARA Presidente Sarmiento =

1897 sail training ship

Coordinates: 34°36′32.23″S 58°21′56.31″W

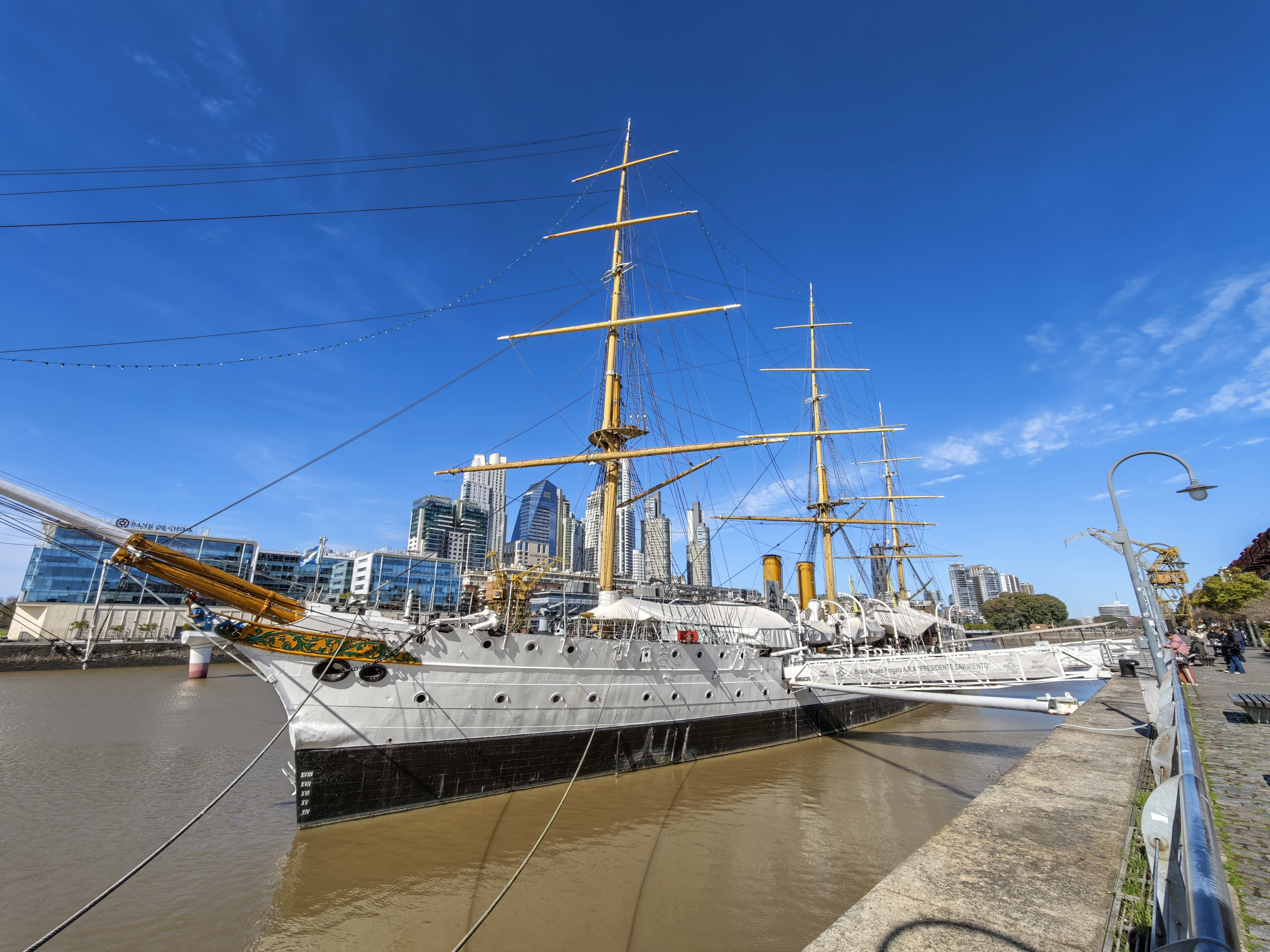
- Moored at Puerto Madero, Buenos Aires

History

Argentina
- Name: Presidente Sarmiento
- Namesake: Domingo Faustino Sarmiento
- Builder: Laird Brothers, Birkenhead, England
- Launched: 31 August 1897
- In service: 1897
- Out of service: 1961
- Status: Museum ship in Buenos Aires, Argentina

General characteristics
- Type: Sail training ship
- Displacement: 2,750 tonnes
- Length: 81 m (266 ft)
- Beam: 13.11 m (43.0 ft)
- Draught: 5.64 m (18.5 ft)
- Propulsion: Steam, 3-cylinder compound, 1,000 hp (750 kW), ship rig

National Historic Monument of Argentina

ARA Presidente Sarmiento is a museum ship in Argentina, originally built as a training ship for the Argentine Navy and named after Domingo Faustino Sarmiento, the seventh President of Argentina. It is considered to be the last intact cruising training ship from the 1890s.

== History ==
The ship was originally built for the Argentine Naval Academy. ARA Presidente Sarmiento made thirty seven annual training cruises including six circumnavigations of the globe. The ship was retired as a seagoing vessel in 1938, but continued to serve without sails on Argentine rivers around 1950 and as a stationary training ship until 1961.

It is now maintained in its original 1898 appearance as a museum ship in Puerto Madero near downtown Buenos Aires.

== Propulsion and auxiliaries ==
=== Rigging ===
Three-masted frigate
• Mainmast: 54.3 m
• Foremast: 52 m
• Mizzenmast: 42.5 m
• Bowsprit and spar: 23.2 m
• 21 sails with 2300 m² of sail area
• 12 auxiliary sails

=== Engine ===
In addition to its sailing rig this ship includes a large triple expansion steam engine supplied by two coal-fired boilers exhausting through the rear stack. An additional auxiliary boiler exhausting through the forward stack provides steam for other than propulsion, including two engines driving electrical generators on the main deck (below the weather deck).

==== Fuel ====
A single coal bunker is positioned between the main and auxiliary boiler rooms

=== Steering ===
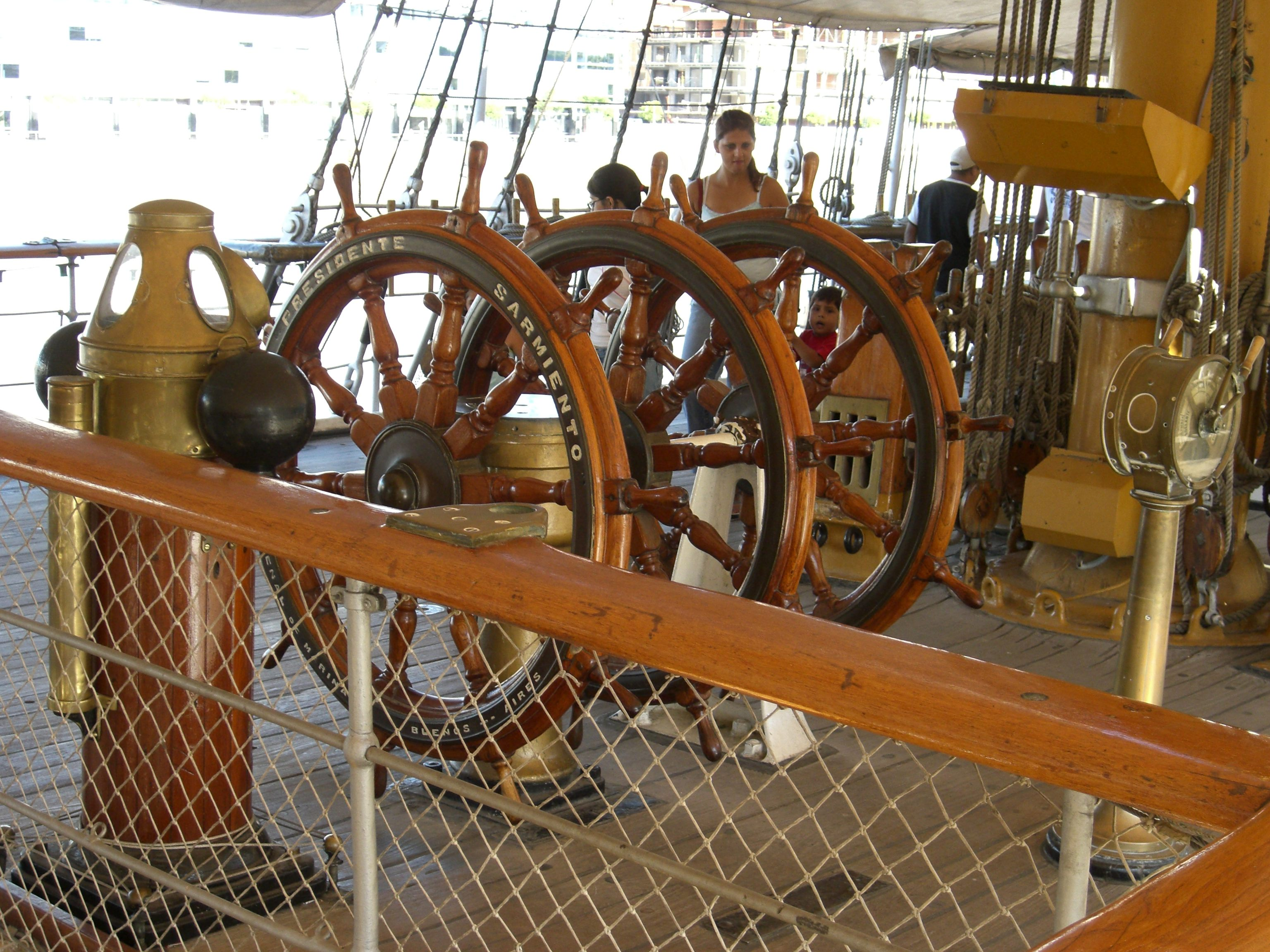
Helm

A three-wheel chain drive allows up to six helmsmen to control the rudder. Such a crew of operators was not always required due to the inclusion of an electric servo-drive for normal operation but was useful for the training of cadets.

== Armament ==
=== Artillery ===
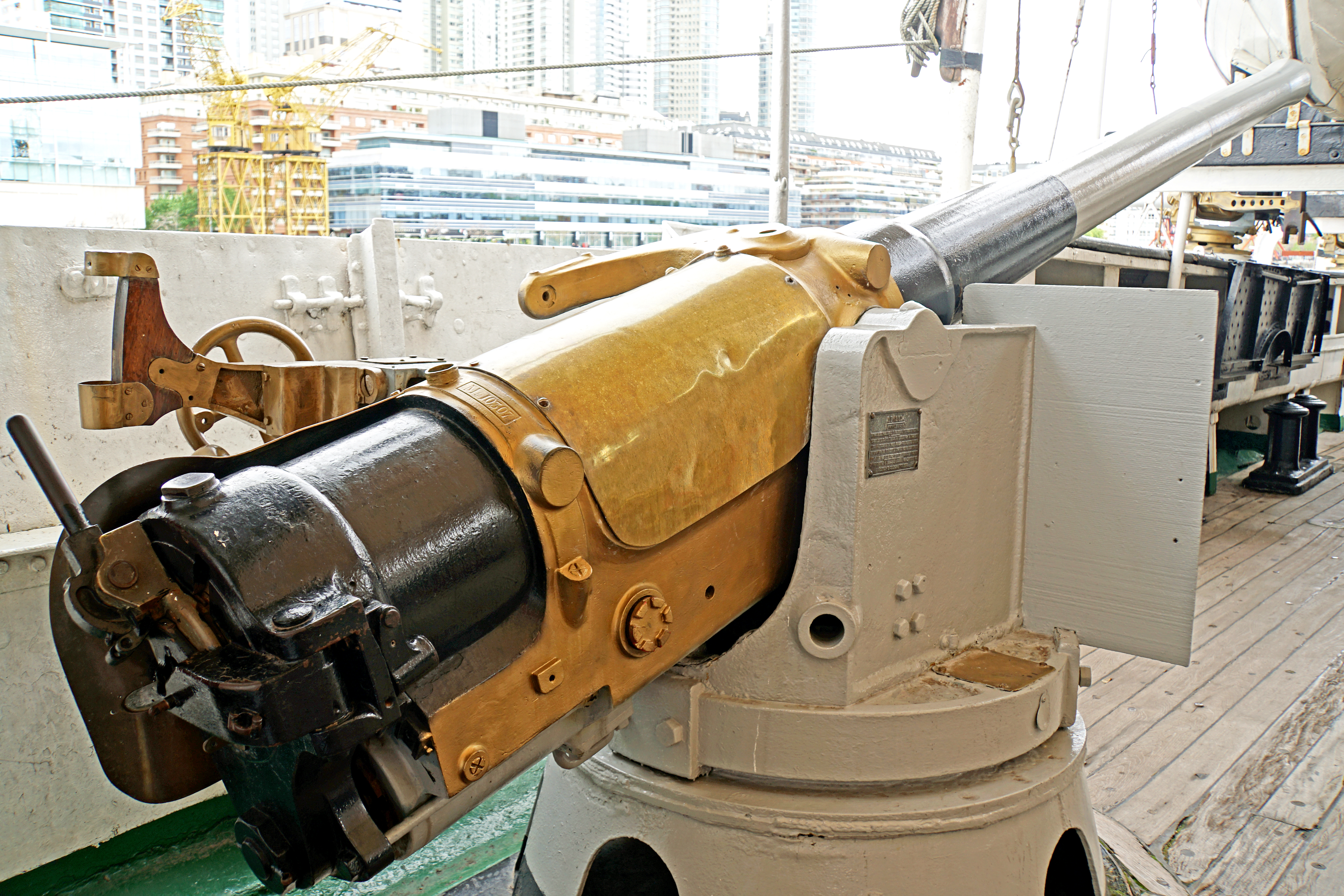
A gun on the deck

Four Armstrong gun mounts are positioned amidships, two on each side, with additional smaller weapons. The museum information indicates those as 5-inch pieces, but Norman Friedman identifies those as 120-mm L45 Elswick Pattern Y. Documentation on the ship shows these having had some armor, but the present installations are bare.

=== Torpedoes ===
A single torpedo scuttle using gravity expulsion exited at the bow. The scuttle has been removed and the exit port welded shut, but in the current museum configuration a torpedo is suspended in a position on the main deck ready to enter the former scuttle entrance. Additional torpedo storage is provided below this main deck.

== Historic images ==
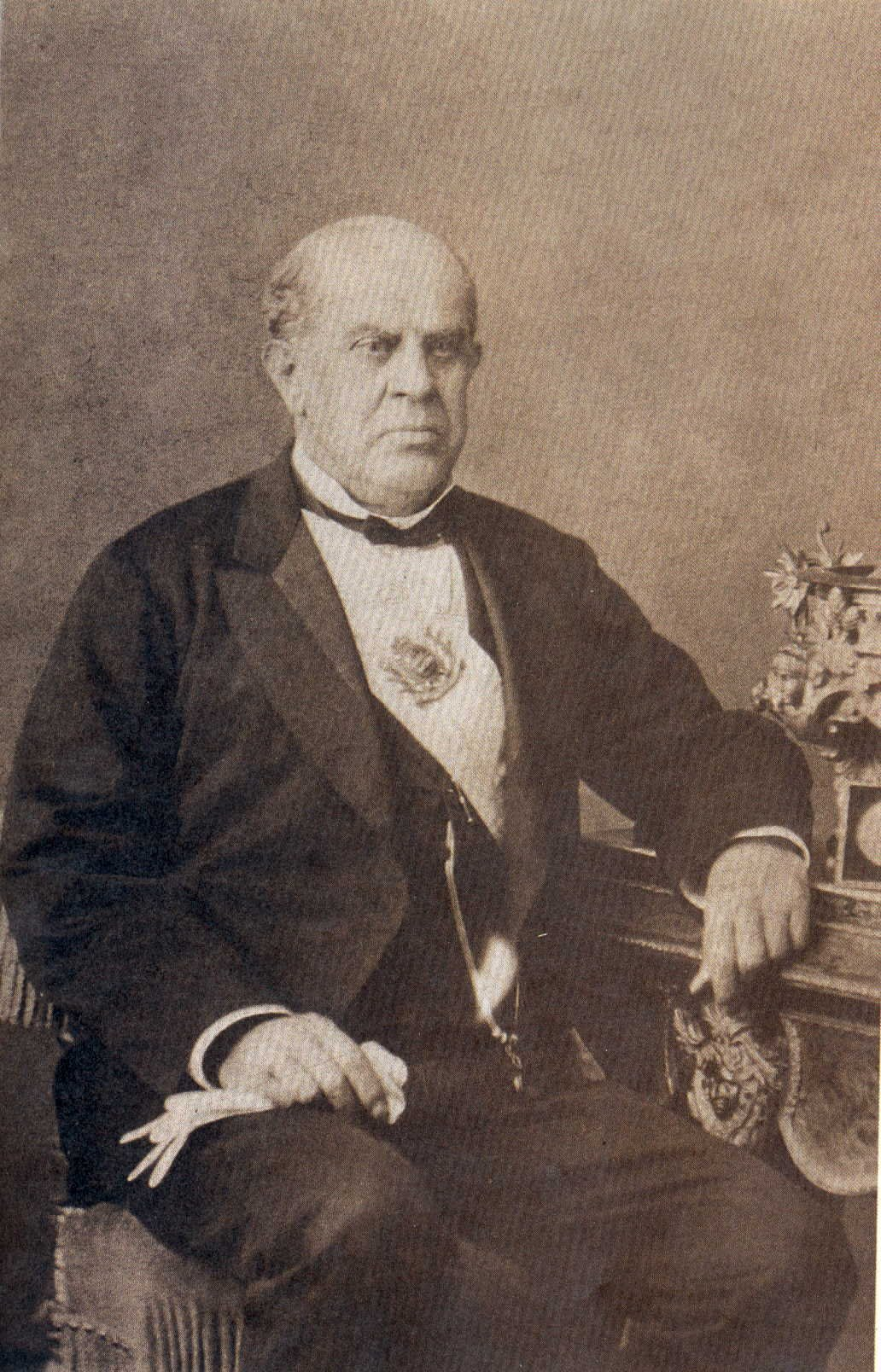
1873 image of the ship's namesake

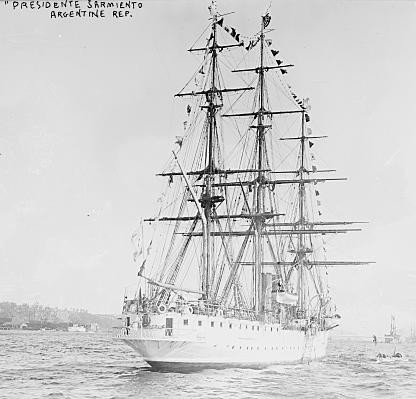
1909 image of the ship

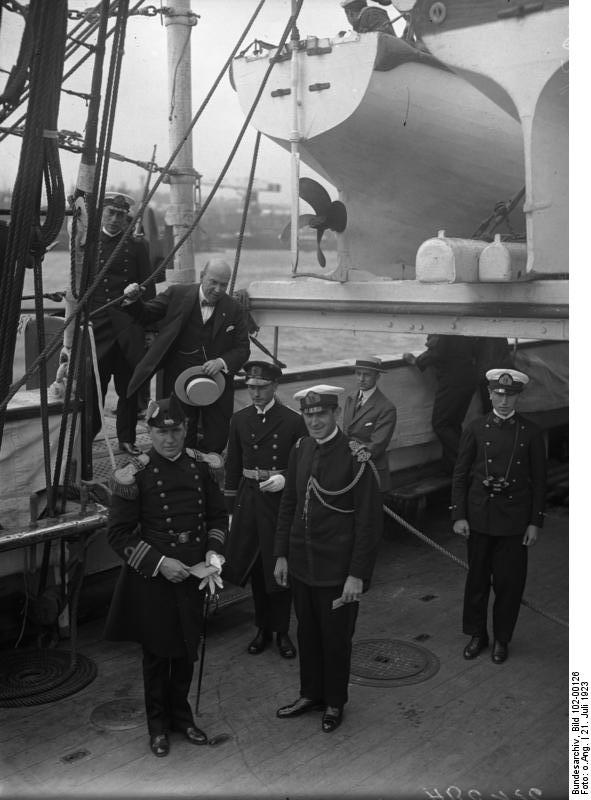
Capitan A. Brana and staff, Hamburg, 1923

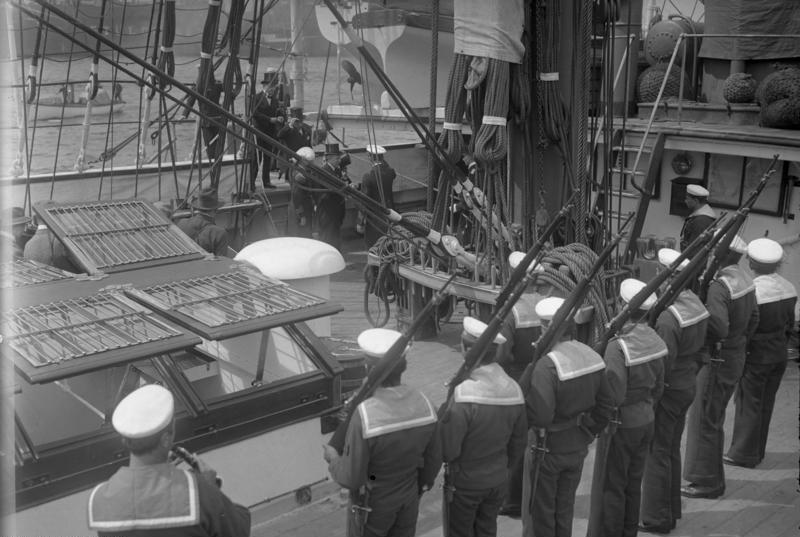
Cadets honor guests, Bremerhaven, 1931

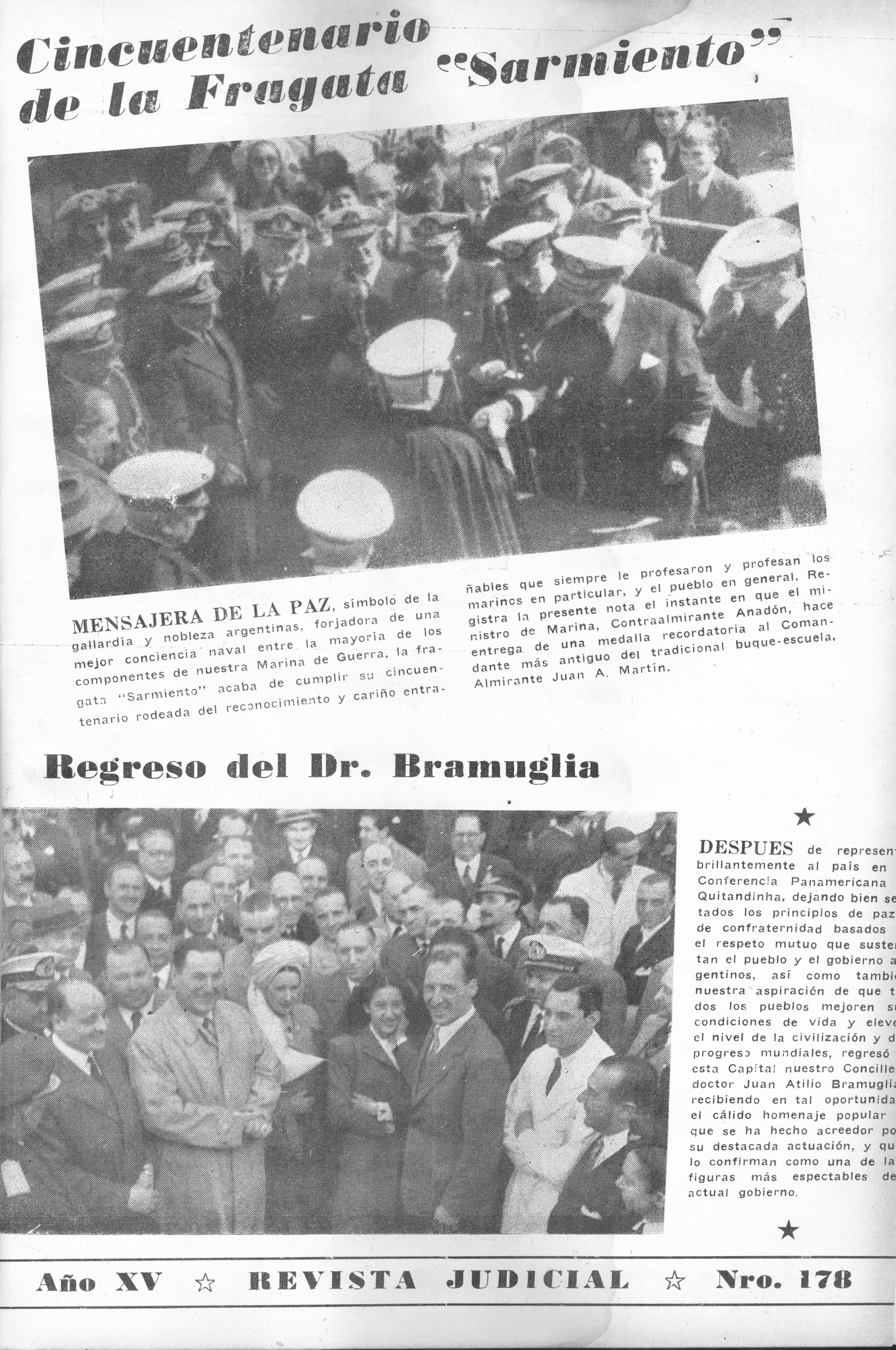
Publication allusive to its fiftieth anniversary, 1947

== Museum ==
It is moored in Puerto Madero close to the Bicentennial Plaza and is now the ARA Presidente Sarmiento Frigate Museum.

== See also ==
- ARA Uruguay, a smaller historic tall ship moored nearby in basin number three.
- Argentine peso moneda nacional; the ship was featured on the 5 peso coin from 1961 to 1968.
