= Puerto Madero =

Neighbourhood of Buenos Aires, Argentina

Coordinates: 34°36′43″S 58°21′53″W

- Barrio
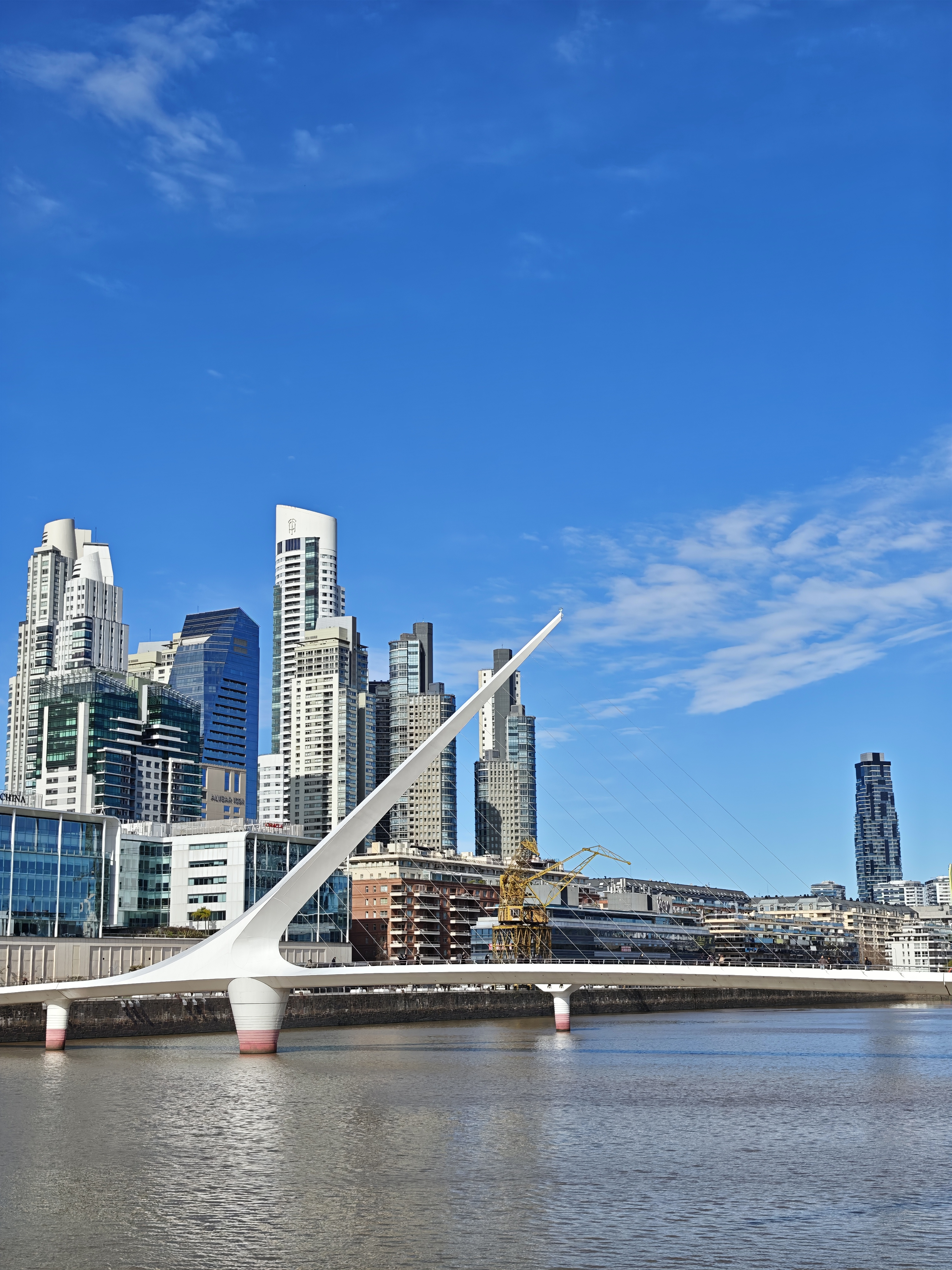
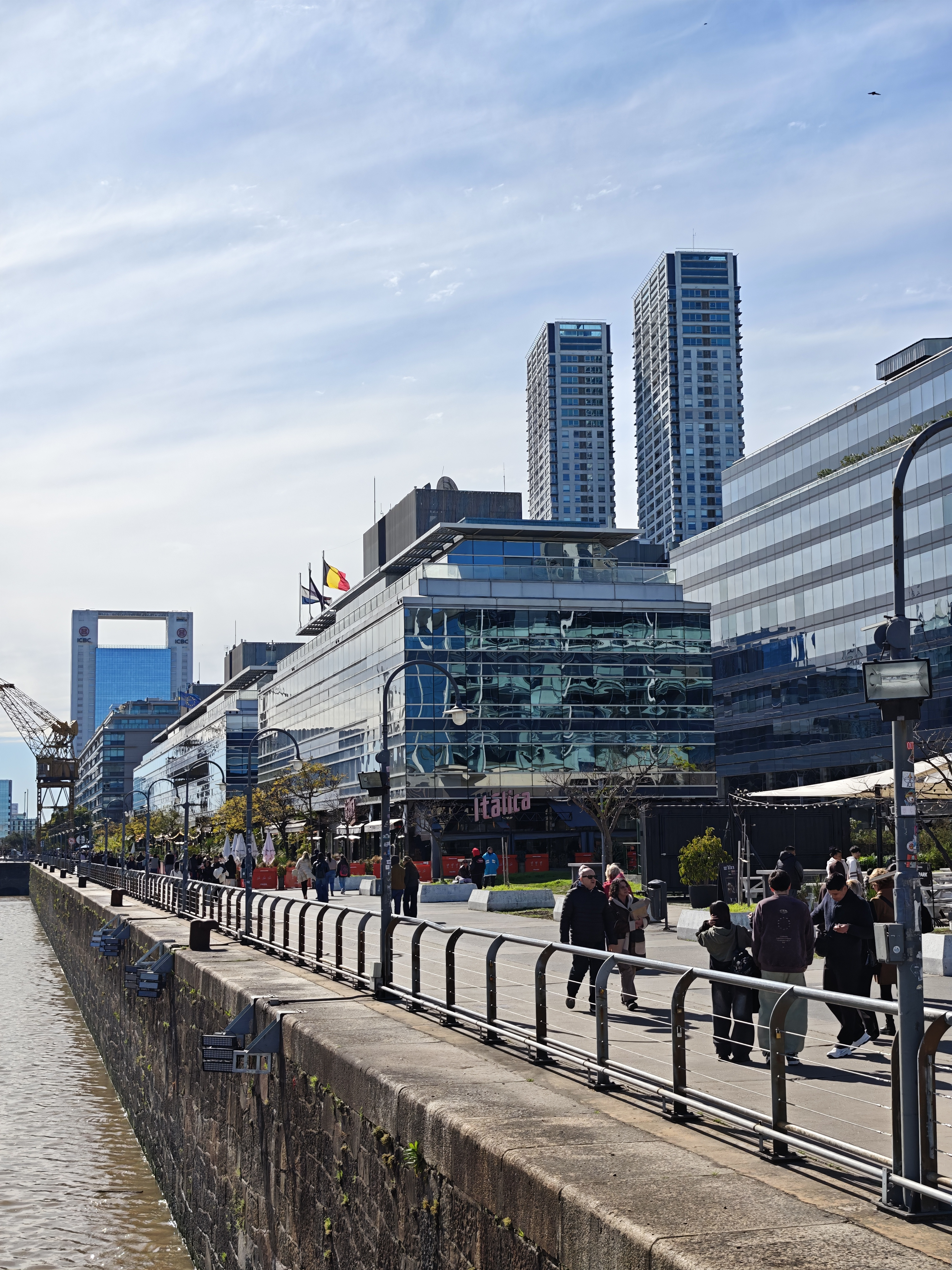
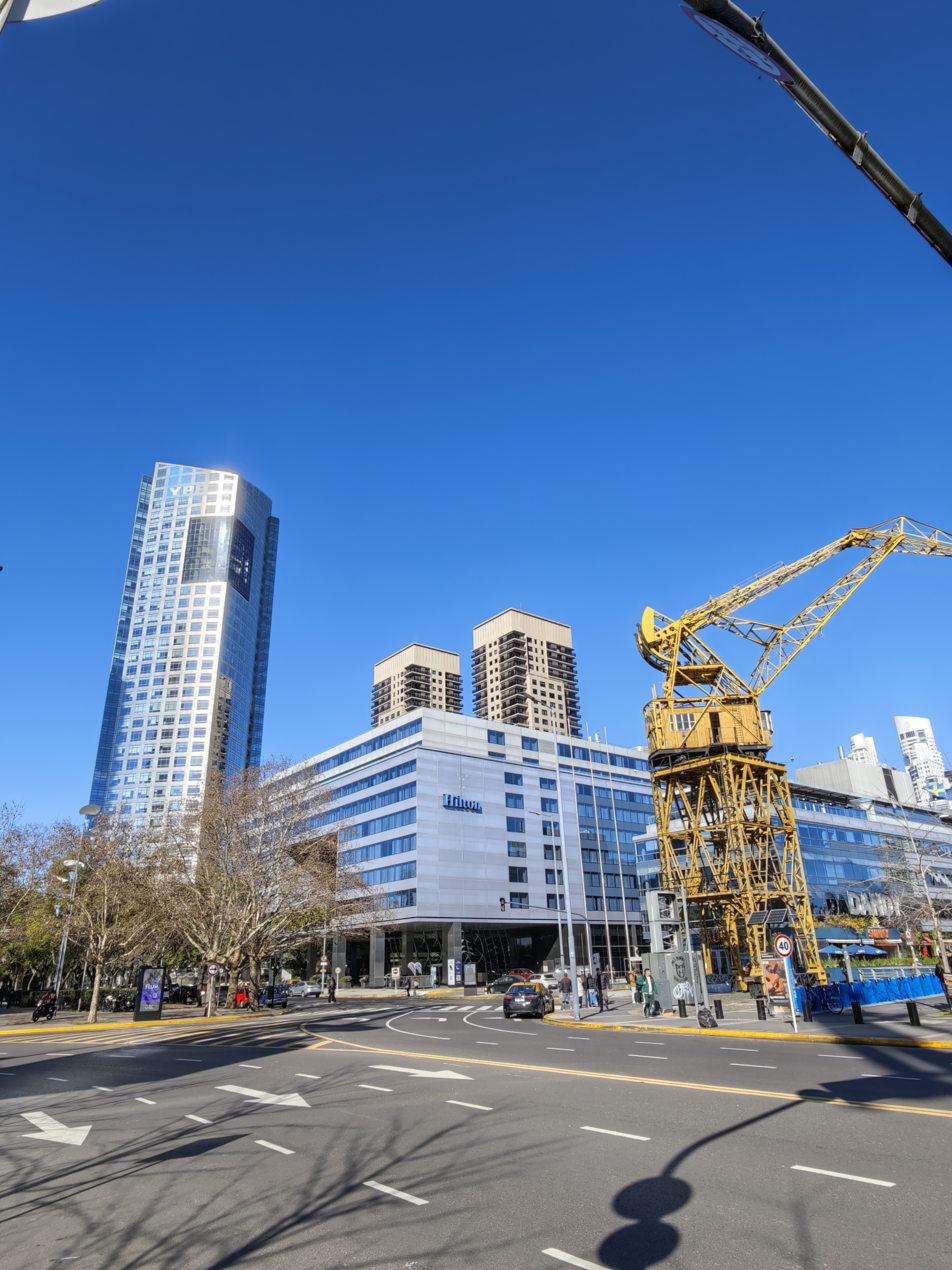
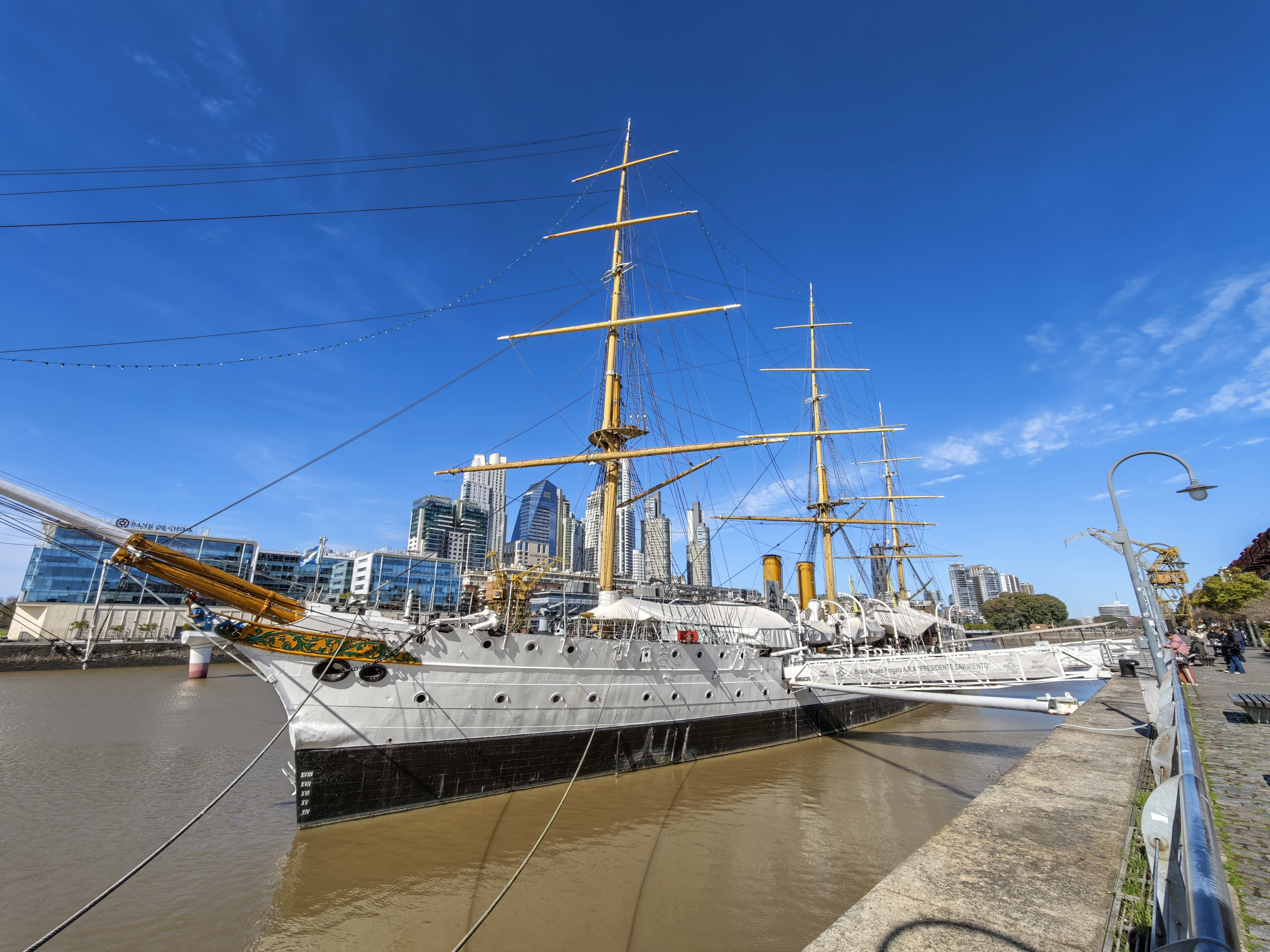
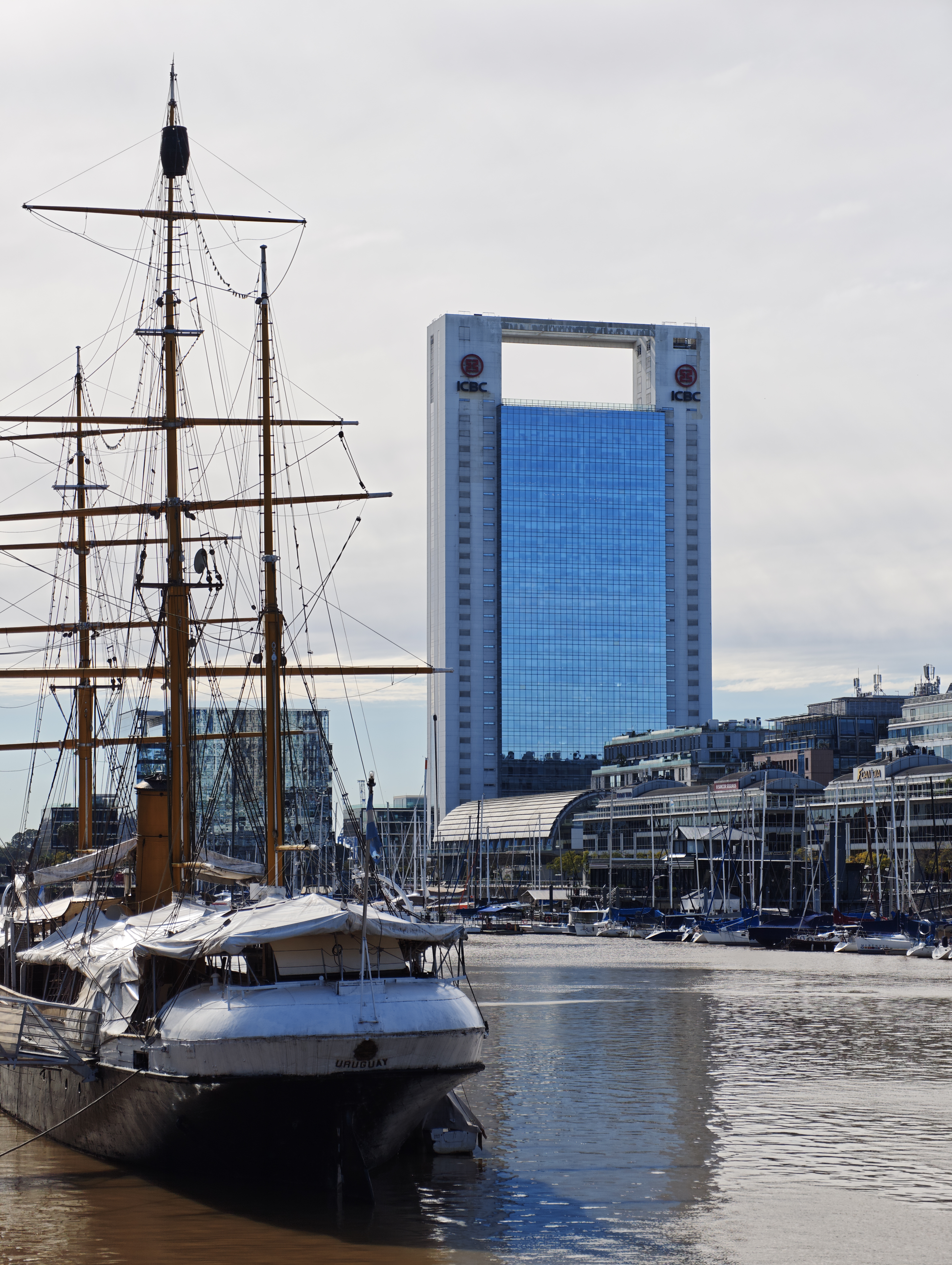
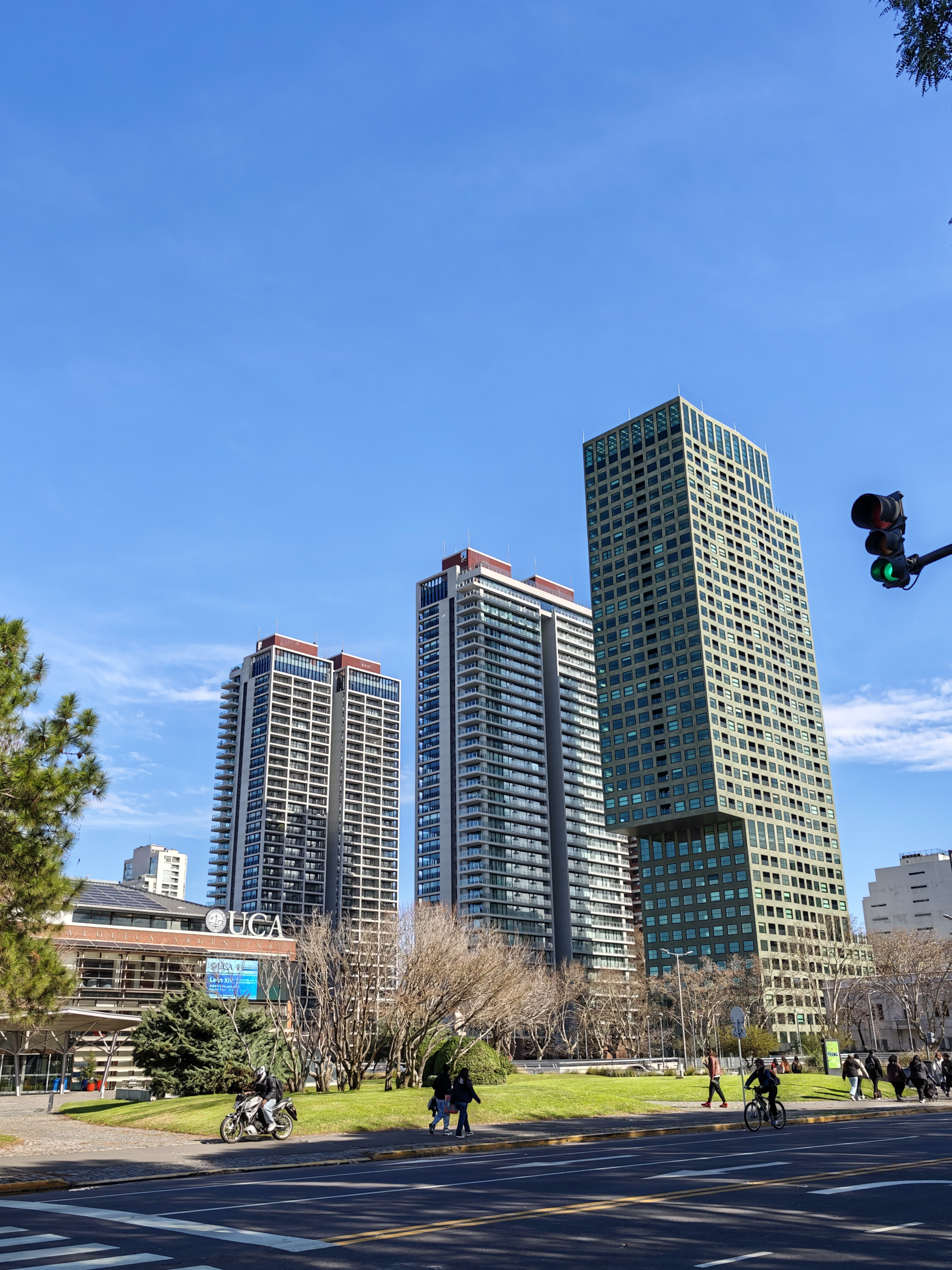
- From top to bottom, left to right: View of the Puente de la Mujer and the skyscrapers in front of dock 3, view of the dock waterfront and the Torres del Yacht, the Hilton Hotel and the YPF Tower, the Fragata Sarmiento, the Madero Office tower and the Corbeta Uruguay, the Catholic University of Argentina and new buildings on Huergo Ave.

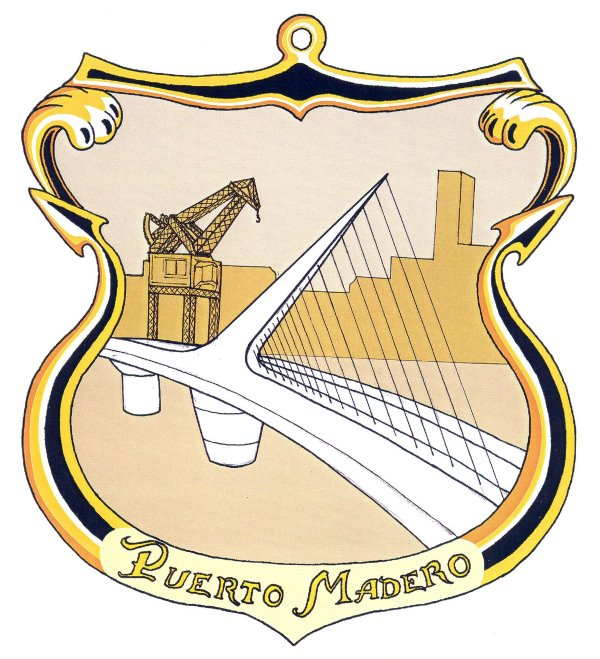
- Emblem
- Location of Puerto Madero within Buenos Aires
- Country: Argentina
- Autonomous City: Buenos Aires
- Comuna: C1

Area
  - Total: 2.1 km^{2} (0.81 sq mi)

Population (2010)
  - Total: 6,629
  - Density: 3,200/km^{2} (8,200/sq mi)
- Time zone: UTC-3 (ART)

Puerto Madero, also known within the urban planning community as the Puerto Madero Waterfront, is a barrio of Buenos Aires in the Central Business District. Occupying a significant portion of the Río de la Plata riverbank, it is the site of several high-rise buildings and luxurious hotels, featuring the latest architectural trends. Puerto Madero has by far the highest property values of any barrio within Buenos Aires, surpassing the second-highest twofold.

== History ==
=== 19th century ===
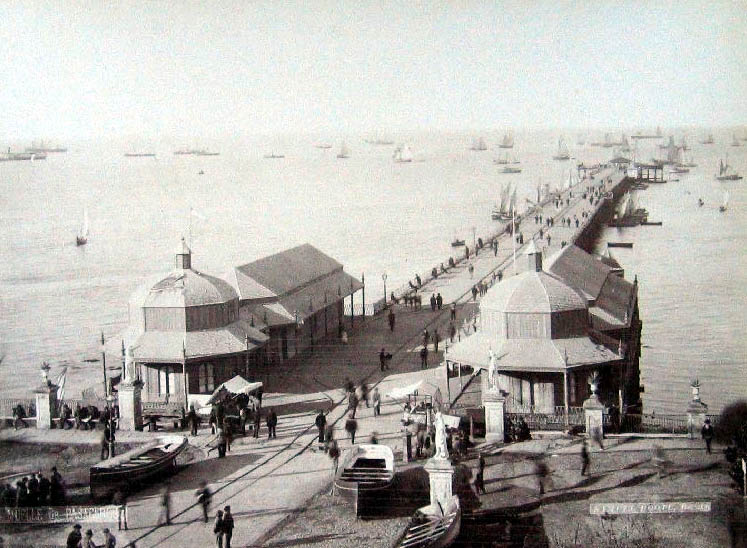
Edward Taylor's pier, a city landmark from 1855 until the docks' development.

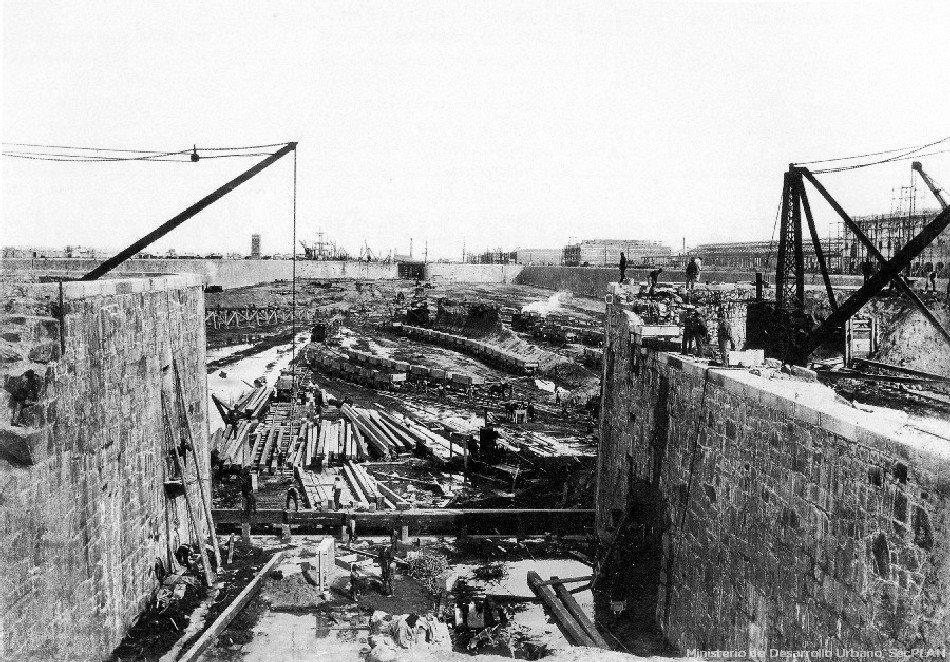
The construction of Dock 2, 1891.

From its inception, the city of Buenos Aires had a problem accommodating large cargo ships, as per Puerto La Boca, because the shallow river did not allow for direct docking. Instead, ships were moored away from the shore, with passengers and merchandise being unloaded onto barges and ferries for transport to the pier.

In 1882, the national government contracted the local businessman Eduardo Madero to take charge of the construction of a new port which would solve these problems. Construction began in 1887 and was completed in 1897, although the installed fittings had been partially operative some years before completion of the port. It was a costly project and an engineering landmark at the time, but ten years after its completion the appearance of larger cargo ships made Puerto Madero obsolete.

The government had to then face the construction of a new port, this time contracting engineer Luis Huergo, whose plans for a port of staggered docks which would open directly onto the river was among those rejected in the 1880s. His plans resulted in the Puerto Nuevo (New Port), still operating today, whose first section opened in 1911.

=== 20th century: from neglect to recovery ===
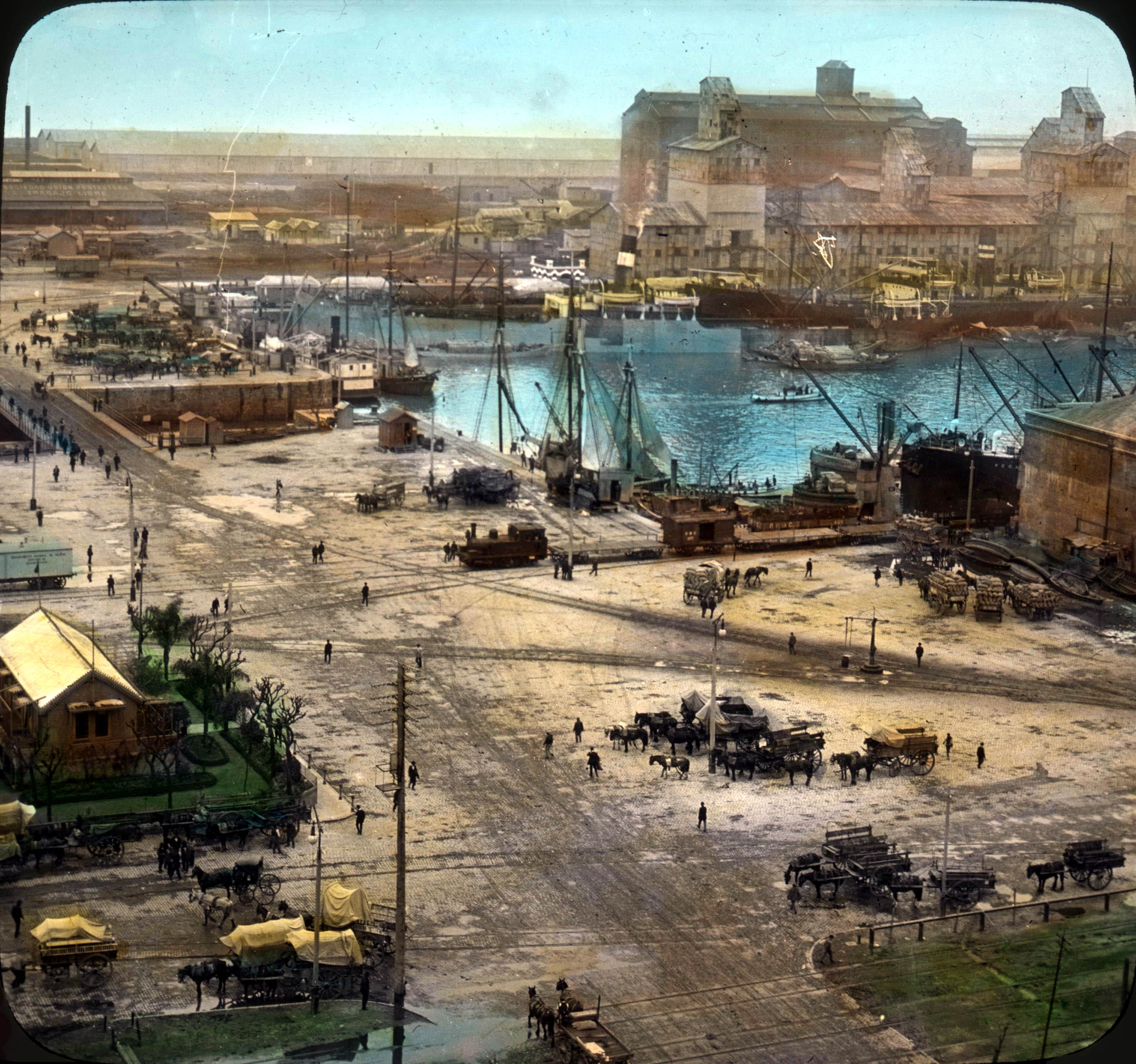
The Buenos Aires Harbour around 1915.

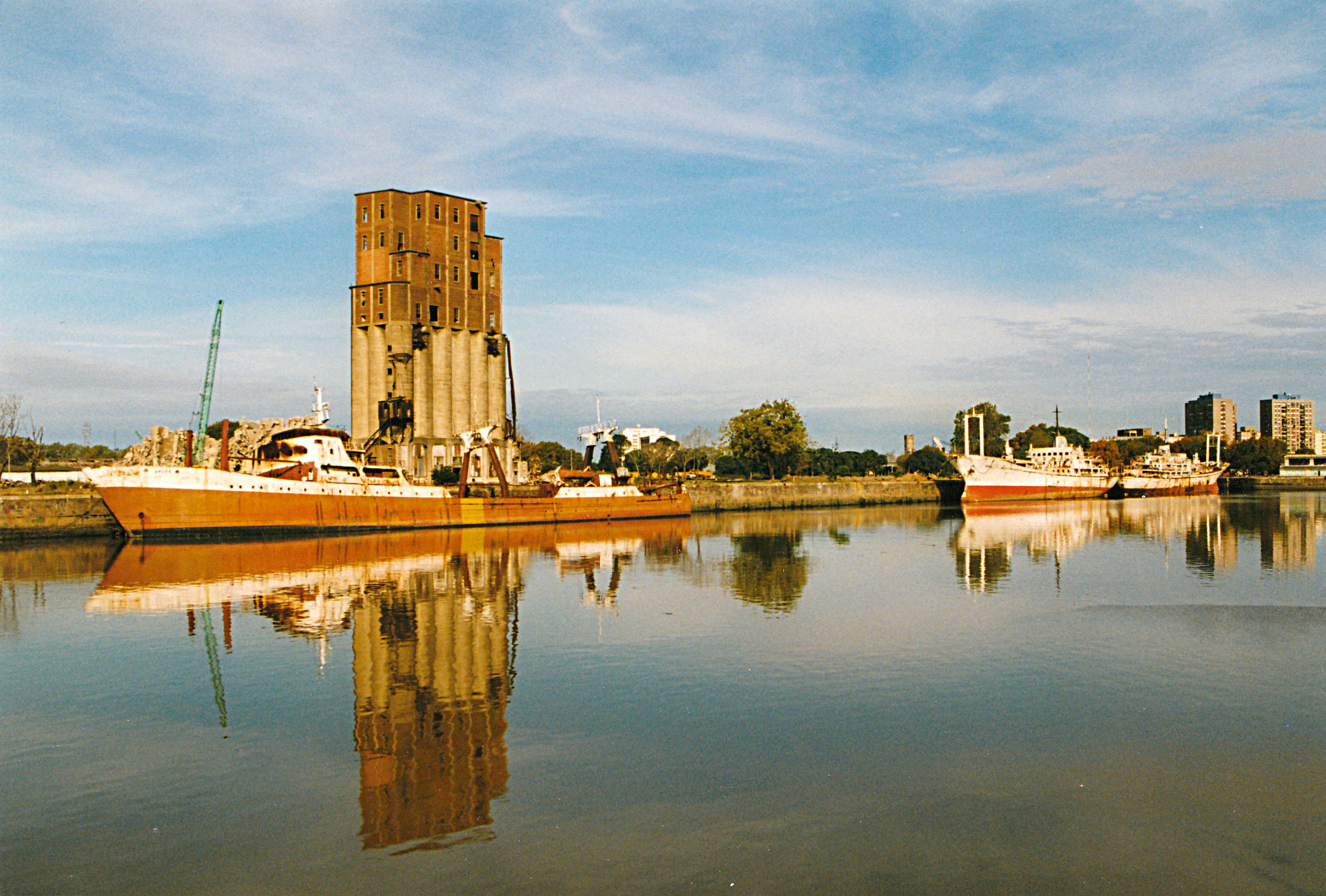
Dock 1 of Puerto Madero in 1999.

The New Port of Buenos Aires was completed in 1926, making the existing Madero docks superfluous. Though these continued to serve in ancillary port functions, the zone gradually decayed, becoming one of the city's most degraded areas, a mixture of warehouses and large tracts of undeveloped land. In 1925, 1940, 1960, 1969, 1971, 1981 and 1985, successive proposals were put forth with the intent of urbanizing the old port, or to demolish it outright; none of these plans came to fruition, however.

On November 15, 1989, the Ministry of Works and Public Services, the Department of the Interior and the City of Buenos Aires signed the acts of incorporation of a joint-stock company denominated "Corporación Antiguo Puerto Madero" (Old Puerto Madero Corporation). Having as objective the urbanization of the area, the federal and city governments participated as egalitarian partners.

The 170 hectares of the place had overlapping jurisdictions: the General Administration of Ports, Argentine railroads and the "Junta Nacional de Granos" (National Grain Board) had interests in the zone. The signed agreement implied the transference of the totality of the area to the Old Puerto Madero Corporation S.A., whereas the government of the city remained in charge of the urban development regulations.

=== 21st century ===
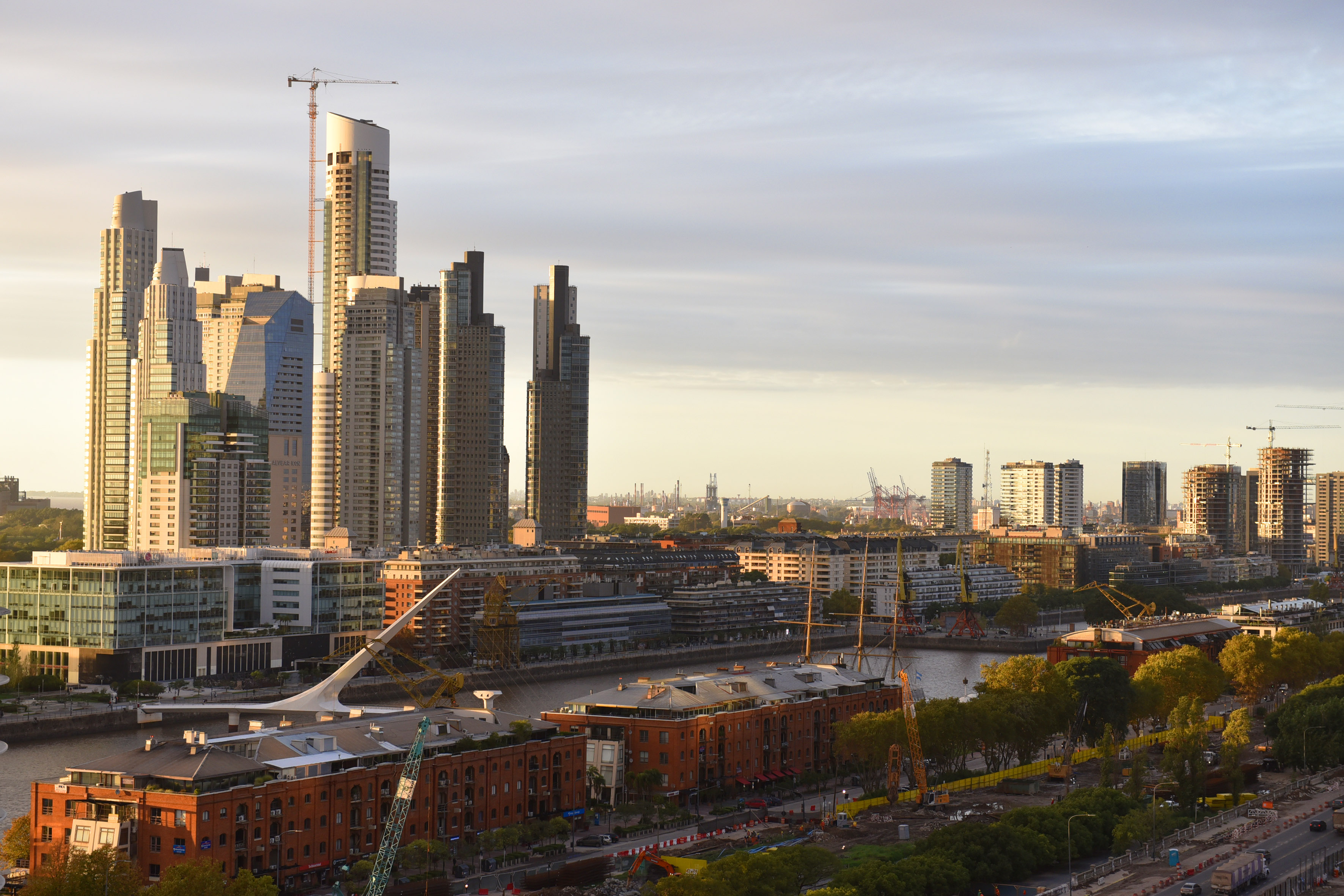
Puerto Madero in 2018.

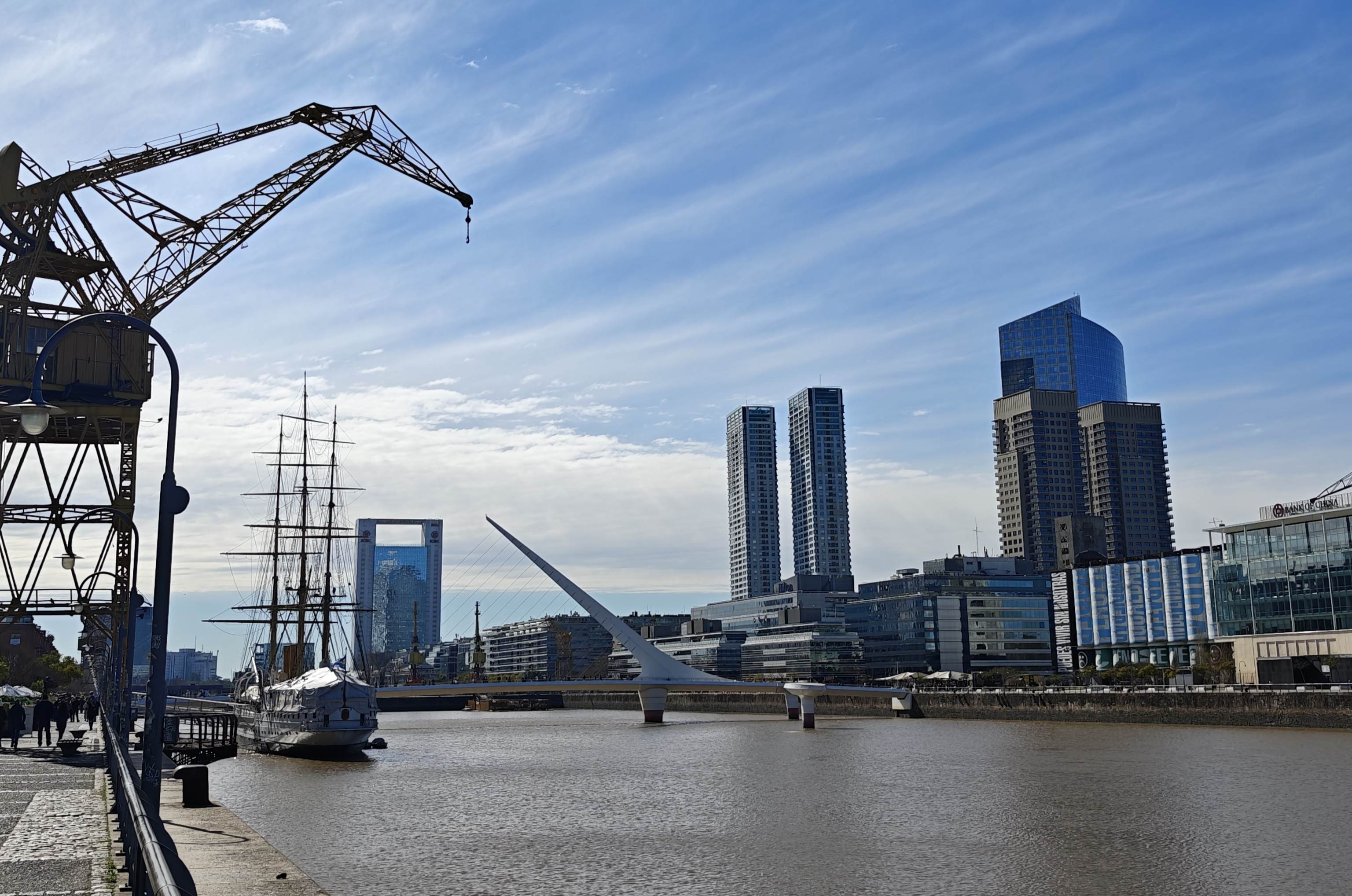
High-rise buildings along Dock 4 seen from Dock 3. Puente de la Mujer can be seen in the foreground, alongside with YPF, Yacht and Madero Office towers.

In the 1990s, local and foreign investment led to a massive regeneration effort, recycling and refurbishing the west side warehouses into elegant houses, offices, lofts, private universities, luxurious hotels and restaurants that conform to a gallery of options for this new district in a city that grew up turning its back to the river. Led by the 1999 opening of the Hilton Buenos Aires, luxurious hotels, state-of-the-art multiplex cinemas, theatres, cultural centres, and office and corporate buildings are located mostly in the east side.

Puerto Madero has been redeveloped with international flair, drawing interest from businessmen, architects and designers such as Santiago Calatrava, Norman Foster, César Pelli, Alan Faena, Philippe Starck, among others. Today one of the trendiest boroughs in Buenos Aires, it has become the preferred address for growing numbers of young professionals and retirees, alike. Increasing property prices have also generated interest in the area as a destination for foreign buyers, particularly those in the market for premium investment properties.

The neighbourhood's road network has been entirely rebuilt, especially in the east side. The layout of the east side consists currently of three wide boulevards running east–west crossed by the east side's main street, Juana Manso Avenue. The layout is completed with some other avenues and minor streets, running both east–west and north–south, and by several pedestrianised streets.

Every street in Puerto Madero is named after a woman. The Puente de la Mujer (Women's Bridge), by Spanish architect Santiago Calatrava, is the newest link between the east and west docks of Puerto Madero; a museum inaugurated in 2008, the Fortabat Art Collection, itself resulted from an initiative by Amalia Lacroze de Fortabat (the wealthiest woman in Argentina).

Puerto Madero currently represents the largest urban renewal project in the city of Buenos Aires. Having undergone an impressive revival in merely a decade, it is one of the most successful recent waterfront renewal projects in the world.

At Puerto Madero Dock 2 (between Azucena Villaflor and Rosario Vera Peñaloza) buildings belonging to the Universidad Católica Argentina stand successively to the west, and the Faena Hotel Buenos Aires (formerly Faena Hotel+Universe) is located to the east of Dock 2. Located on the corner of Aimé Painé (Mapuche princess and indigenous rights activist) and Rosario Vera Peñaloza, the modern Iglesia Nuestra Señora de la Esperanza was inaugurated in 1996 and is dedicated to the Virgin Mary, who under the title of Stella Maris, or "Star of the Sea", is the patron saint of the Argentine Coast Guard. The docks aligned with Dock 2, between 1400 and 1500 of Avenida Moreau de Justo, are mostly occupied by various apartment buildings and offices of the Universidad Católica Argentina and its Pabellón de las Artes (Arts Pavilion), a space for art showings with access from the pedestrian side of the dock. Here, there are some bars and coffee shops.

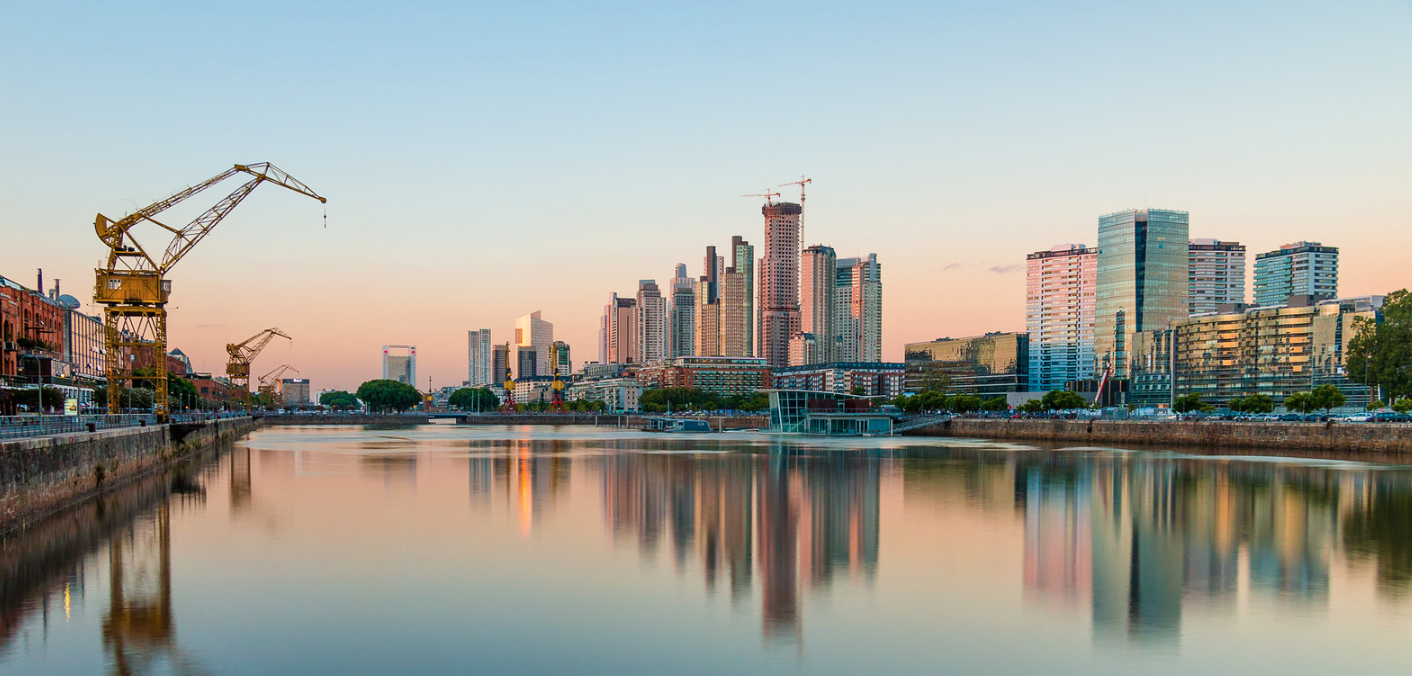
Panorama of Puerto Madero. The original warehouses can be seen at left and high-rise buildings at right.

== Landmarks ==
=== Skyscrapers ===
Numerous residential and office high-rises of up to 50 stories have been built facing the Rio de la Plata since 2000. Most of them are concentrated along the Dock 3 of Puerto Madero; these include Alvear Tower (239 m (784 ft)), Renoir II (171 m (561 ft)), Mulieris Towers (161 m (528 ft)), El Faro Towers (160 m (520 ft)), Repsol-YPF Tower (160 m (520 ft)), Le Parc Tower (158 m (518 ft)), and Chateau Tower of Puerto Madero (156 m (512 ft)).

Tall buildings have also emerged at the Dock 1, where is currently under construction the 198-metre (649 ft) tall Harbour Tower, set to be completed in 2024 as the second tallest skyscraper in Argentina.

=== Museums ===
In the neighbourhood there are several museums and art galleries, among them the Faena Arts Center, the Fortabat Art Collection and the De la Cárcova Museum. The list also includes the museum ships ARA Uruguay and ARA Presidente Sarmiento.

=== Gallery ===
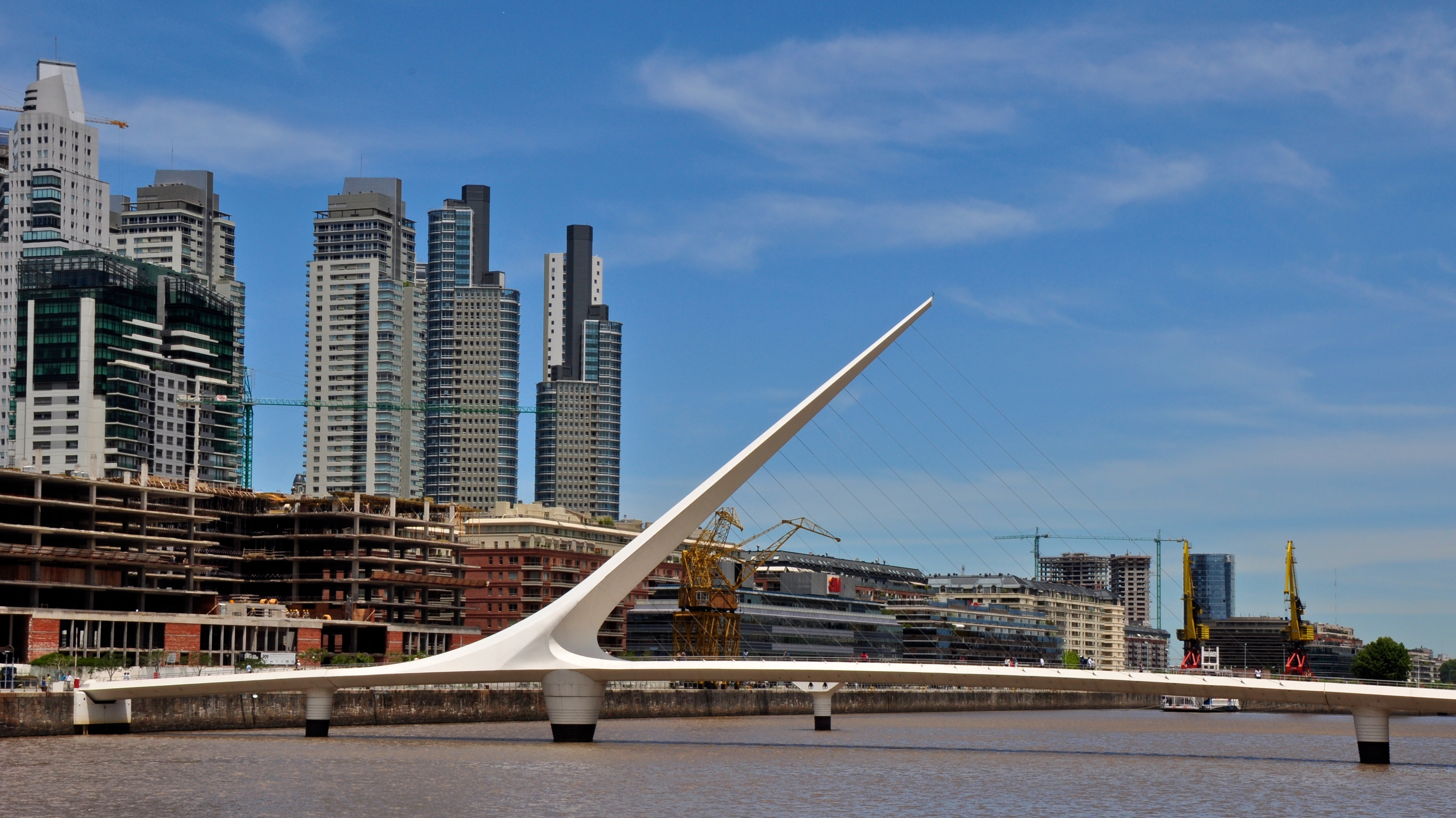
Santiago Calatrava's "Woman's Bridge"

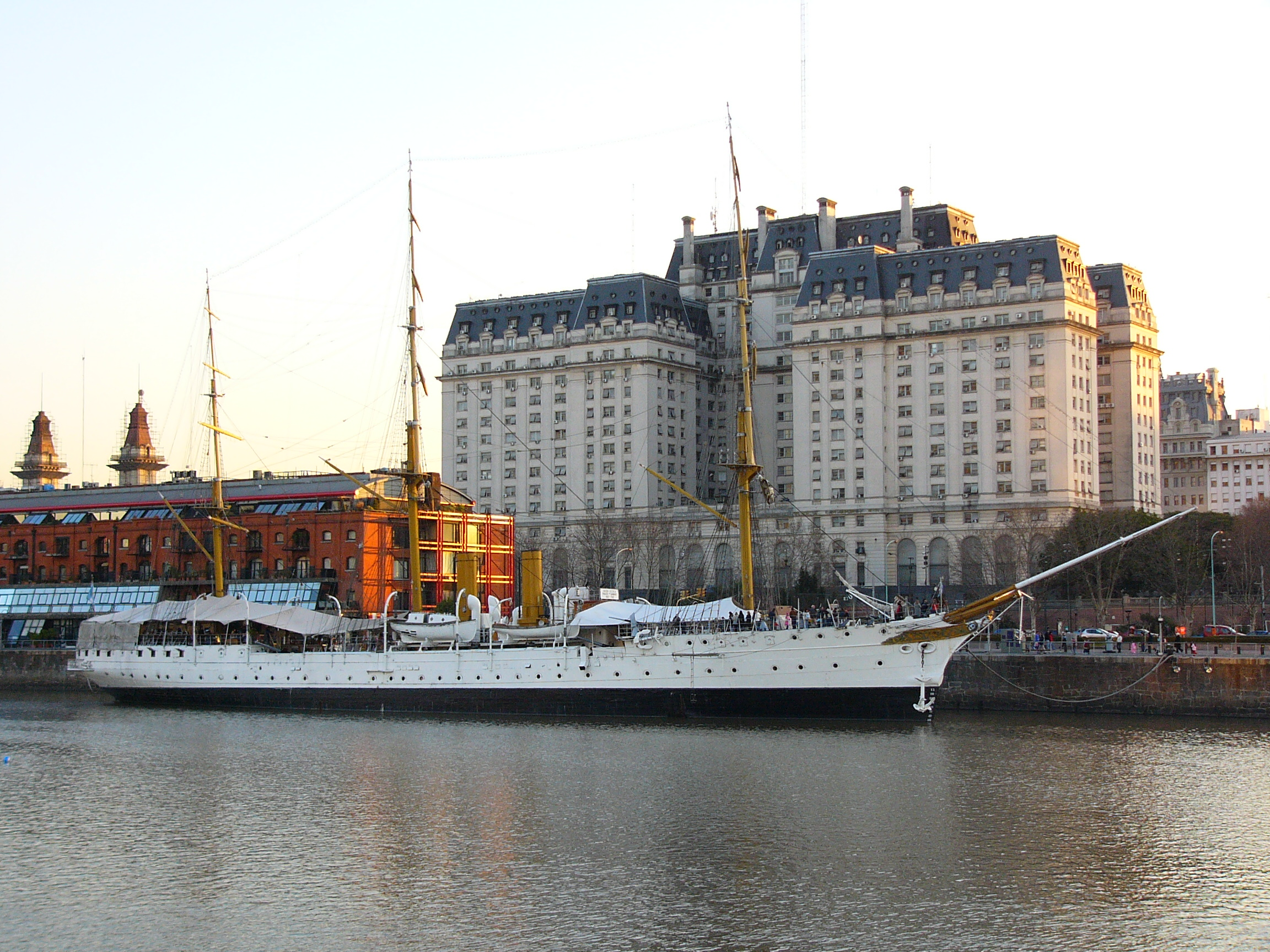
Libertador Building, the Argentine Ministry of Defense

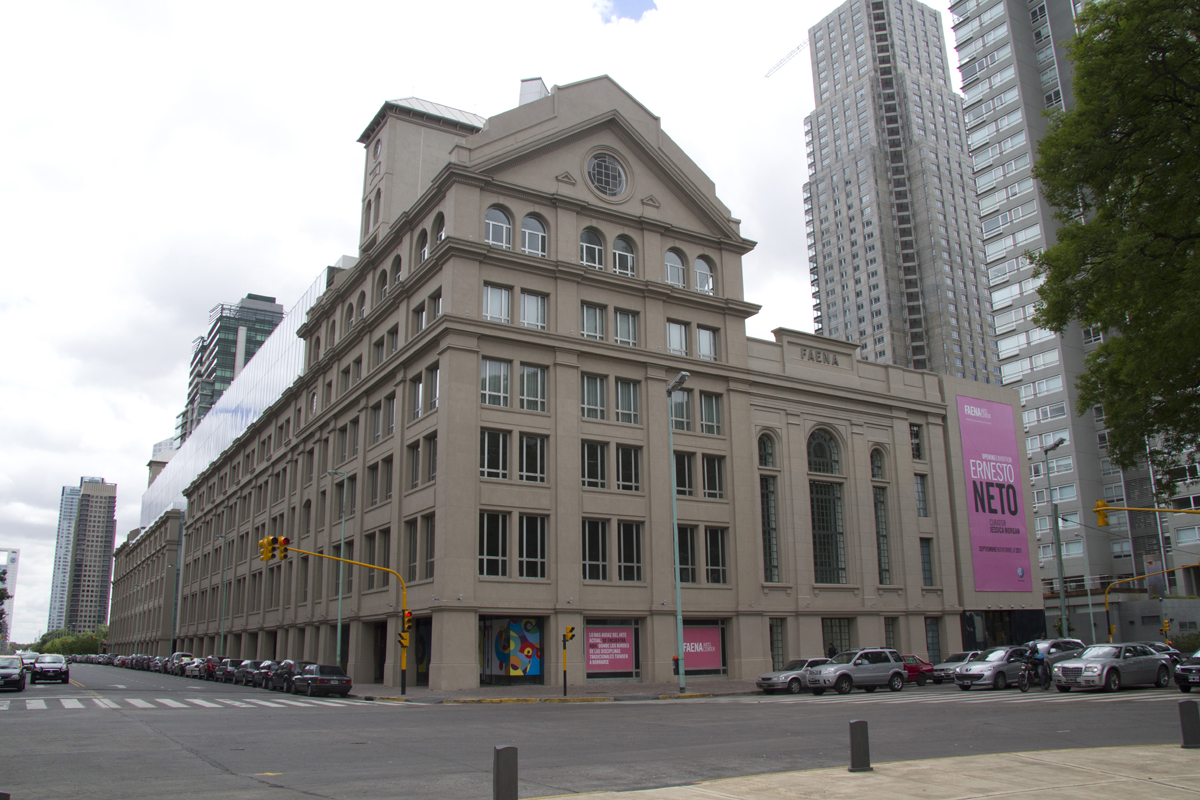
Faena Arts Center

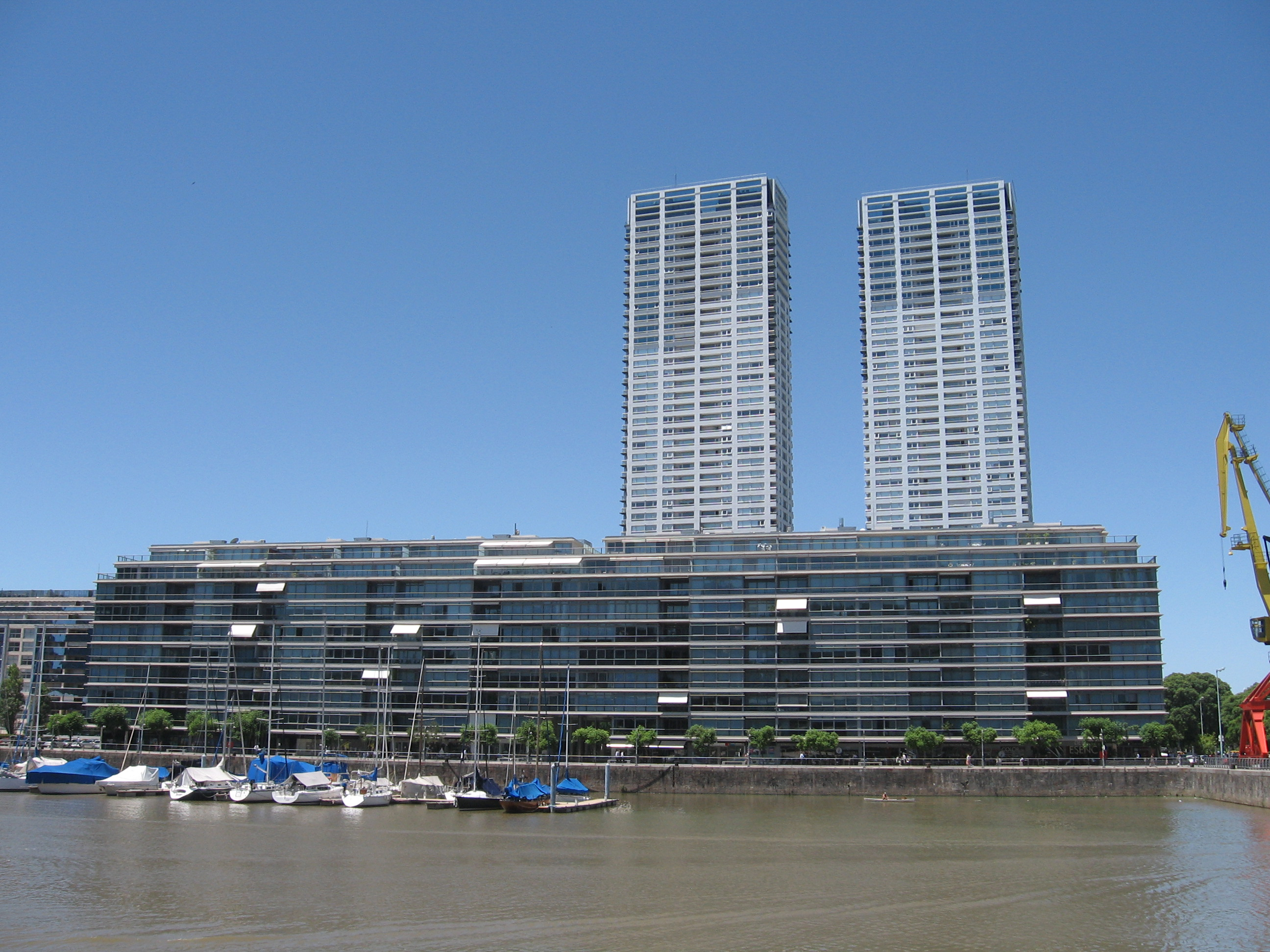
Madero Center

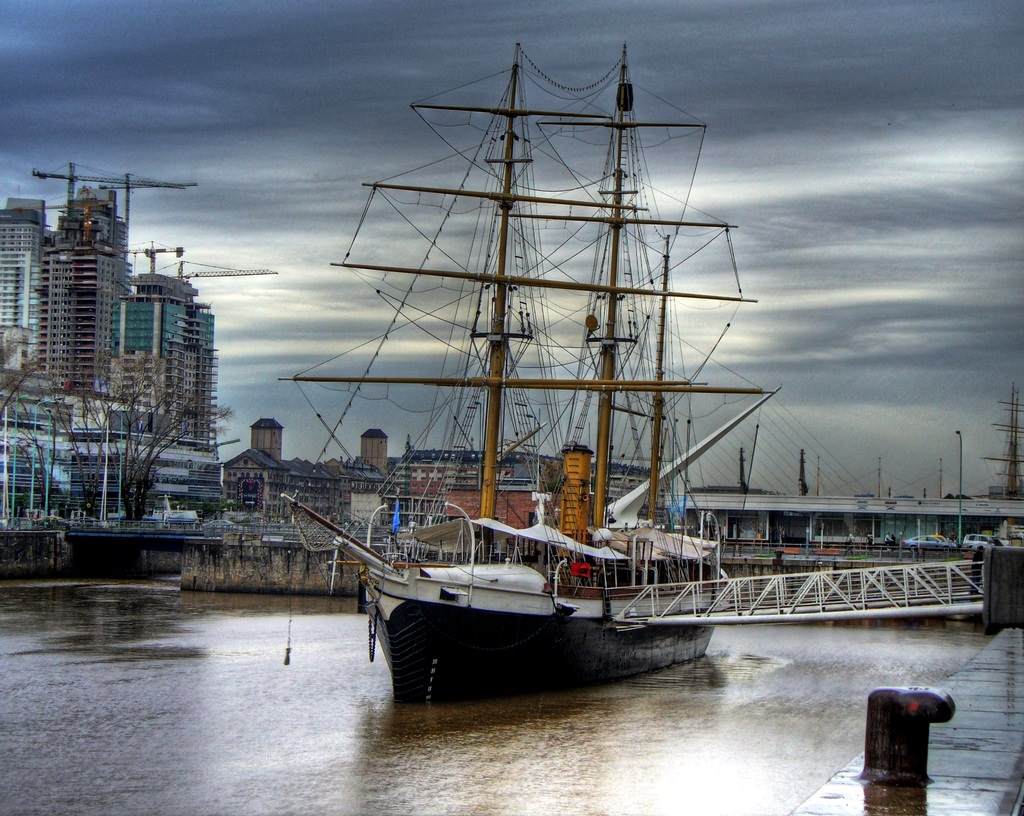
Corvette Uruguay

== Transport ==
The 2 kilometres (1.2 mi) Tranvía del Este, inaugurated in 2007 and closed in 2012, served the area running parallel to Alicia Moreau de Justo Avenue, along the barrio's western side. The neighbourhood is still not well-connected to the city's transit network. Few bus routes run through Puerto Madero, no subway line reaches it and there are currently no official plans to extend the subway network to the neighbourhood despite planned further extensions of the tramway slated to link the Retiro and Constitución train stations.

=== Expressway controversy ===
An expressway connecting the north and the south of the city through Puerto Madero has long been in the planning stage. Several alternatives have been considered, including elevated, ground level, underground, and even an underwater proposal by private developer Julio Torcello, which would run under the four docks. This last proposal was dismissed as impossible to build. All the other proposals have also been criticised: the elevated and ground level options because they would constitute a barrier between Puerto Madero and the rest of the city, and the underground scheme because of the cost and negative impact during construction. Placing the expressway between Puerto Madero and the Buenos Aires Ecological Reserve has also been considered, but has been strongly opposed by environmentalists.

== Bibliography ==
- Ann Breen and Dick Rigby, The New Waterfront: A Worldwide Urban Success Story – Text: English, McGraw-Hill Professional; 1 edition (1996) - ISBN 0-07-007454-2 - ISBN 978-0-07-007454-5
- Jorge Francisco Liernur, Harvard University Graduate School of Design, CASE, Nº6: Puerto Madero Waterfront – Text: English – Prestel Publishing (2007) - ISBN 3-7913-3517-0 - ISBN 978-3-7913-3517-9
- Waterfronts - A new frontier for cities on water Text: English, Edizioni Città d'Acqua, Venezia
