= Faena Hotel Buenos Aires =

Hotel in Buenos Aires

Coordinates: 34°36′50″S 58°21′42″W

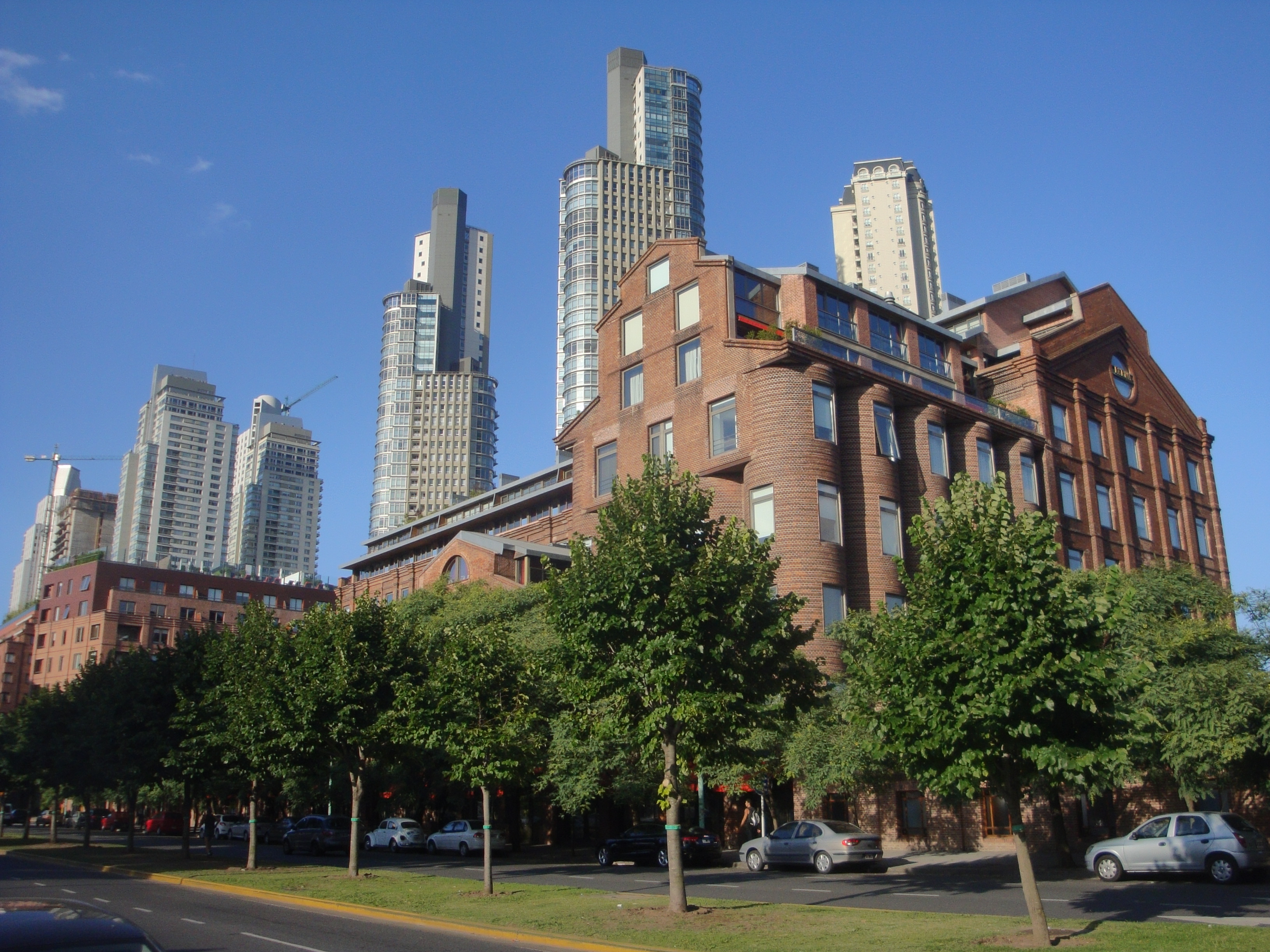
External view of the hotel.

The Faena Hotel Buenos Aires, formally known as Faena Hotel+Universe, is a five-star hotel in the Puerto Madero section of Buenos Aires.

== Overview ==
The lot where the hotel sits today was originally purchased in 1902 by Bunge y Born, a leading local agribusiness firm. They had one of the largest wheat mills in the country, which allowed them to establish Molinos Río de la Plata (a leader in the local retail-foods market).

The structure measured 25,000 m^{2} (270,000 ft^{2}) in indoor area and was built with bricks imported from Manchester. The development of a new port further north after 1911 led to the original docklands' obsolescence, however, and by 1998, the shuttered El Porteño building (as the historic mill was known locally) had been slated for demolition.

Saved from the wrecking ball by local cultural preservation associations, the building was purchased by former fashion designer Alan Faena, who, after a US$40 million investment, opened the Faena Hotel in October 2004.

Faena, together with interior designer Philippe Starck, developed the structure into a hotel with 88 rooms and 80 residential units. The hotel includes the rustic El Mercado restaurant, Bistro Sur restaurant, Library Lounge bar, La Cave wine cellar and private dining room, fashion boutique, El Cabaret, and Faena Spa. El Cabaret hosts the number-one tango show in Buenos Aires, "Rojo Tango". The hotel forms the core of the larger Faena District in Buenos Aires. Faena worked with Norman Foster to create the Faena Aleph Residences - Foster and Partners' first project in Latin America, completed in January 2013. Additionally, Soledad Rodríguez Zubieta served as the hotel's music director and held a weekly DJ residency.

== In popular culture ==
- The hotel featured in the 2015 film Focus.
