= Buenos Aires Customs =

Government building in Buenos Aires, Argentina

Coordinates: 34°36′43″S 58°22′03″W

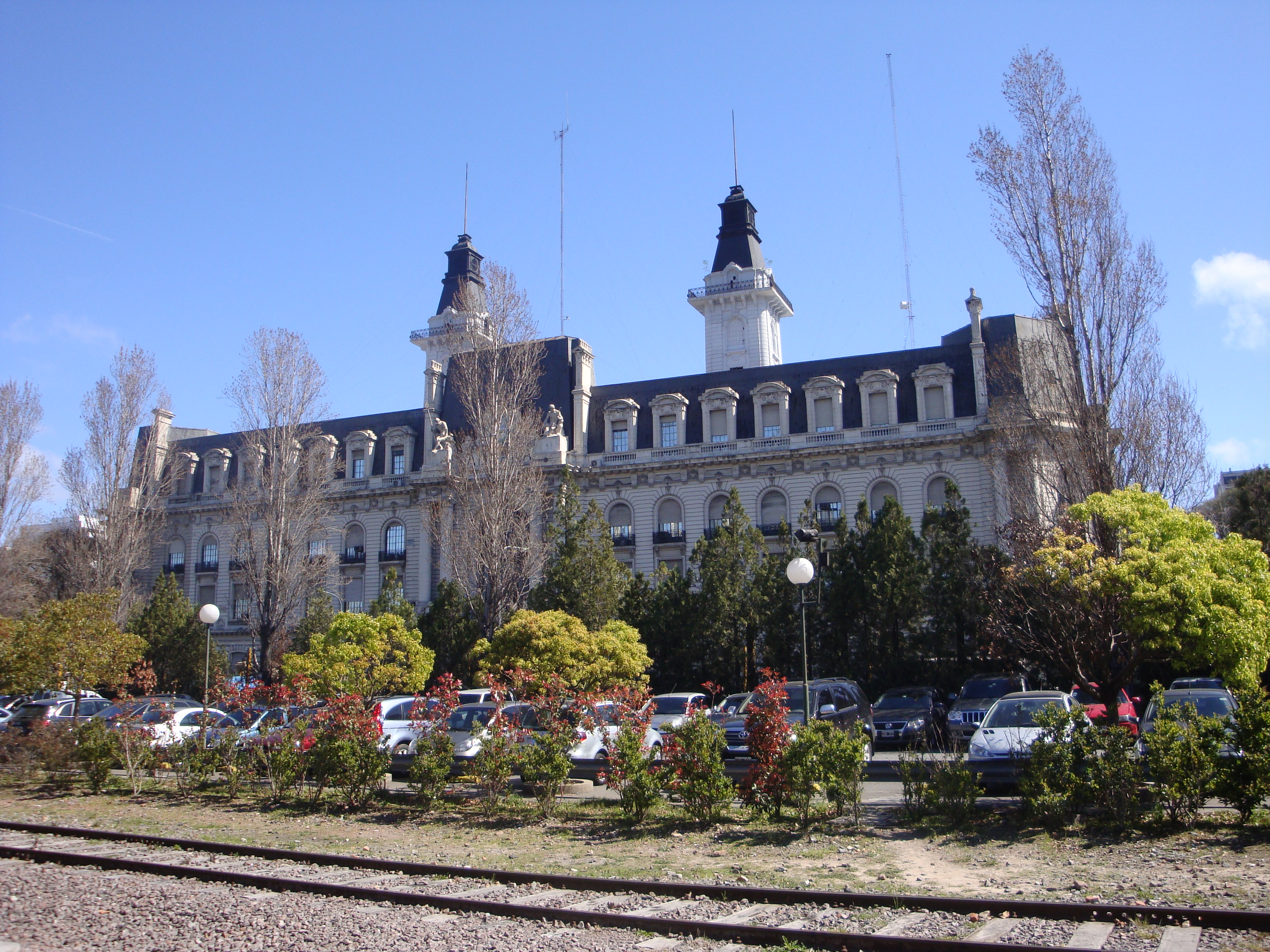
The Buenos Aires Customs House

The Buenos Aires Customs House (Aduana) is a government building and architectural landmark in the Montserrat section of Buenos Aires.

== Overview ==
The French neoclassical building housing the Argentine General Customs Directorate (DGA) was commissioned during the administration of President José Figueroa Alcorta, and resulted from the marked expansion in Argentine foreign trade and the economy in the generation up to 1910, when the nation's GDP was estimated to have grown by over 8% a year. Local architects Eduardo Lanús and Pablo Hary were commissioned in 1909 to design the new administrative offices for the Aduana, which was noteworthy not only for its 100 metres (328 ft) façade and its two turrets, but also for its use of carrara marble cladding throughout, as well as its numerous allegorical details such as the ornamental bull's heads and the marble caryatids along the cornice, some bearing intricate wrought-iron acanthus and laurel wreaths.

The building was inaugurated by President Figueroa Alcorta in October 1910, days before his retirement. Following refurbishment works, on September 28, 2009, the Customs Building was declared a National Historic Monument by President Cristina Kirchner.

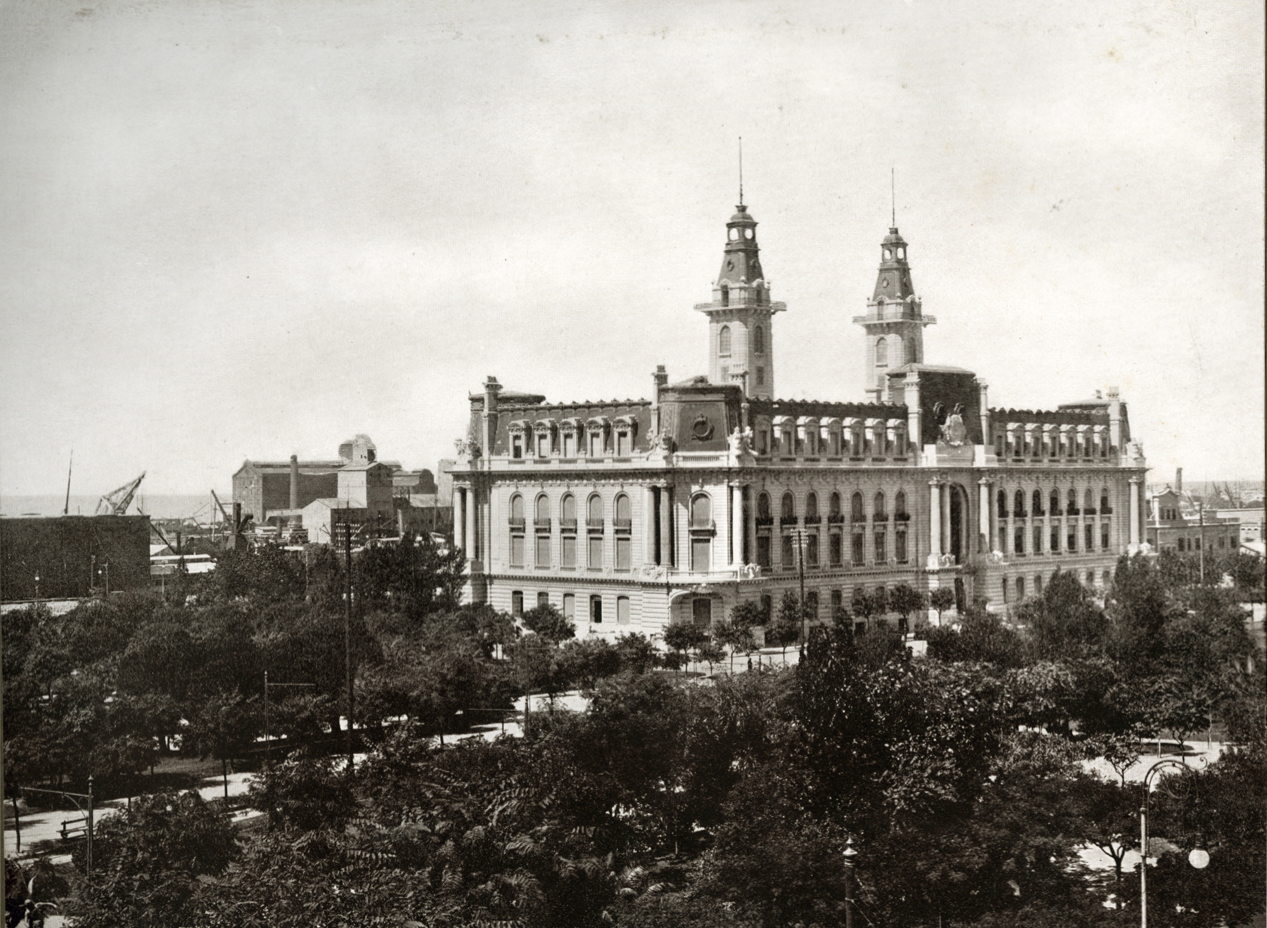
View of the Customs Building in 1910.

The government bureau housed therein, the DGA, traces its origins to the San Nicolás Agreement of 1852, whereby all customs duties were nationalized. The provision, rejected by the Province of Buenos Aires, was first enforced following Buenos Aires leader Bartolomé Mitre's 1860 defeat at the Battle of Cepeda. The National Customs Administration was established in 1862, when following Mitre's election as president, Economy Minister Dalmacio Vélez Sársfield established the bureau (he had developed the Argentine Commercial Code in 1858).

The building reflected the importance of customs duties to the national treasury itself, which from the colonial era of the Viceroyalty of the Río de la Plata until 1930, accounted for around 80 percent of government revenues. The bureau's importance declined after 1945, since which date these revenues have contributed 10-20 percent of the national budget.

The bureau's autonomy later led to significant improprieties, notably the development in 1988 of a "parallel customs" by President Raúl Alfonsín's administrator of the office, Carlos Delconte, and that of a racketeering network in 1991 overseen by President Carlos Menem's customs administrator and brother-in-law, Ibrahim al-Ibrahim (a Syrian national who spoke almost no Spanish). Ultimately, the customs bureau was transferred to the Federal Public Revenue Administration (AFIP) by a 1997 decree signed by President Menem.
