= Soledad Rodriguez Zubieta =

Argentine music curator and radio host

Soledad Rodríguez Zubieta
- Other name: SRZ
- Education: University of Buenos Aires
- Occupations: Psychologist; music curator; radio presenter;
- Years active: 2000s–present
- Notable work: Musicology (radio show and podcast)
- Website: modularmusica.com

Soledad Rodríguez Zubieta (also known as SRZ) is an Argentine psychologist, music curator and radio presenter. She has worked in FM radio as a music programmer and host, and has developed music-programming projects for hospitality and retail spaces through her studio Modular Música.

== Early life and education ==
Rodríguez Zubieta studied psychology at the University of Buenos Aires and later pursued postgraduate studies in cultural management in Argentina.

== Career ==
=== Radio ===
Rodriguez Zubieta has been active as a music programmer and then later as an on-air host since 2003 in Argentine FM radio. Over the following years she was associated with the Radio Metro 95.1, where she handled music selection for programmes including Brunch, Fresh and Su atención por favor.

She later hosted Musicology on Radio con Vos 89.9. The programme was subsequently distributed in archived and podcast form through services including Apple Podcasts, RadioCut, Spotify and Everand. It was a programme built around music from different years/decades and styles, rather than algorithmic playlists.

In April 2026, she was invited as Resident DJ, a radio programme on KCRW of Santa Monica College and NPR's flagship member station in Southern California, in which, each month, a featured artist takes on a residency and presents original one-hour mixes for the station.

=== DJ work and events ===
Rodríguez Zubieta has held DJ residencies and programming roles at Buenos Aires venues including Isabel restaurant and the Faena Hotel Buenos Aires. She has also performed at fashion events as Buenos Aires Fashion Week.

Under the name SRZ, Rodríguez Zubieta has been listed as a DJ in coverage of events in Buenos Aires, including appearances at Buenos Aires Fashion Week, the Unlock Festival, as well as in press features on local DJs.

=== Music direction for hospitality and retail ===
Rodríguez Zubieta has worked in music direction and curation for hospitality and retail spaces, developing music concepts and ongoing programming for venues and hotel properties in Argentina and Europe. Her work has been associated with projects linked to Isabel in Buenos Aires, the Pony Line bar at the Four Seasons Hotel Buenos Aires, the Hotel Pulitzer in Paris, and Iberostar hotels and resorts, among others.

=== Modular Música ===
In 2009 Rodríguez Zubieta founded Modular Música, described in Argentine press as a studio focused on designing and maintaining music selections for venues and brands.

== New concepts and approach ==
Rodríguez Zubieta use the term decoración sonora (“sound decoration”) to describe an approach to music selection as part of the experience of a space, including attention to mood, sequencing and the people who will listen to the music over time.

== See also ==
- Sound branding
- Ambient music
- Disc jockey
- Radio con Vos
