= Compañía Primitiva de Gas de Buenos Aires Ltda. =

Former energy company of Argentina

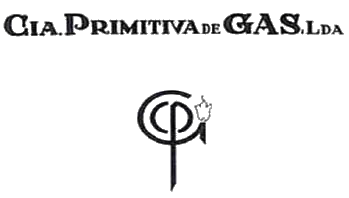

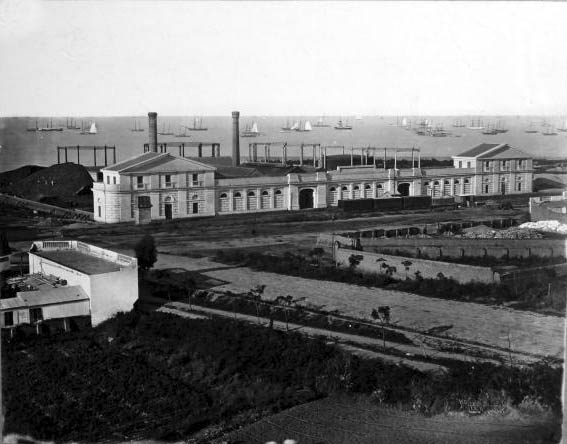
- Gasworks in Retiro, Buenos Aires
- Industry: Energy
- Founded: 1853
- Defunct: 1945; 81 years ago
- Successor: Gas del Estado
- Headquarters: Buenos Aires, Argentina
- Area served: Buenos Aires City; Buenos Aires Province; Santa Fe
- Products: Fuel gas electricity kerosene

Compañía Primitiva de Gas de Buenos Aires Ltda. (English: Primitiva Gas Company of Buenos Aires Ltd.) was an energy company in Argentina which was responsible for the production and supply of gas and electricity. The company of British origin, operated in the city of Buenos Aires between 1854 and 1945. It was the first energy company of the country.

== History ==
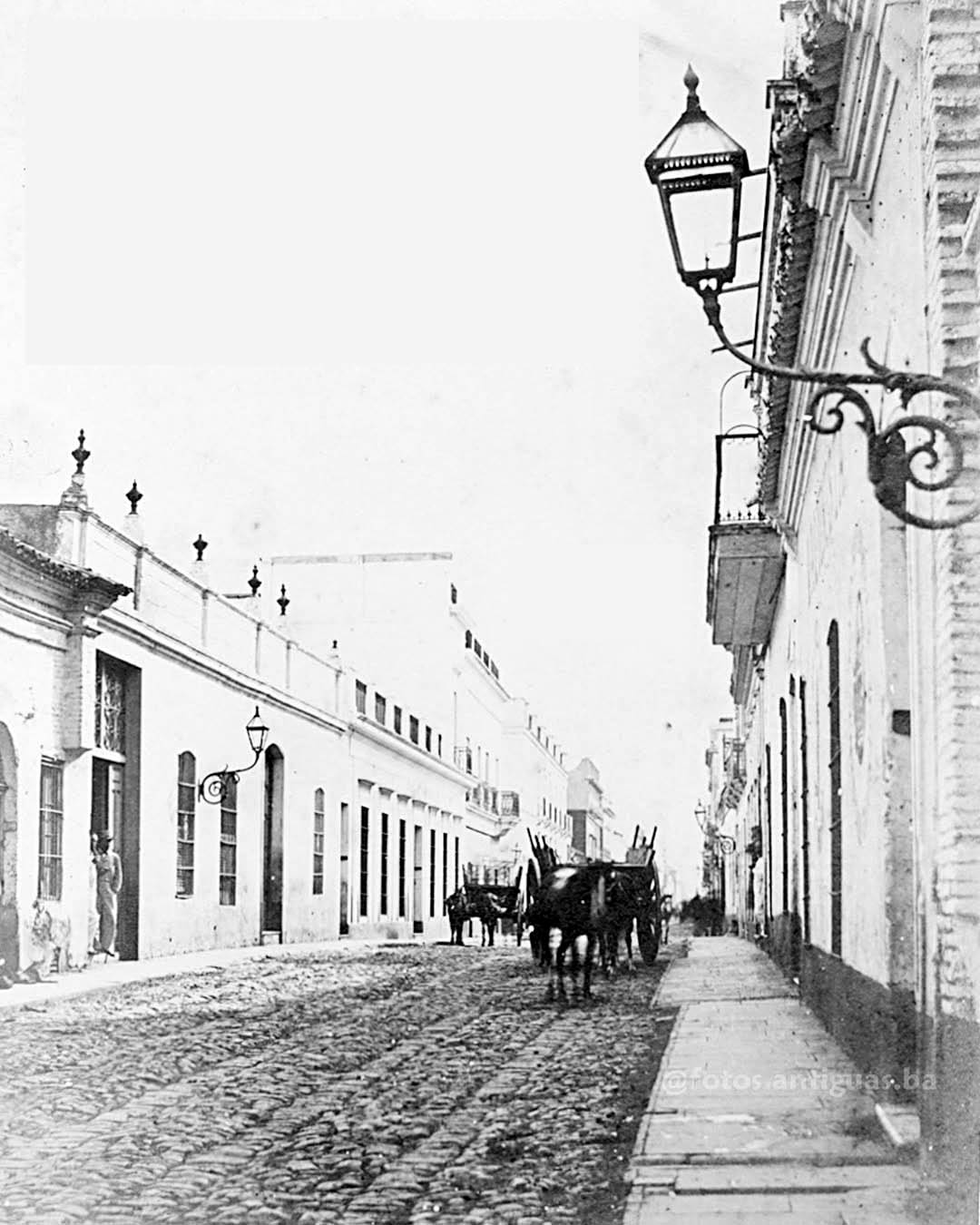
Gas lantern at Bartolomé Mitre and Reconquista streets in Buenos Aires

By 1824 Buenos Aires' main square was illuminated with hydrogen gas. This event, carried out by the English engineer Santiago Bevans, placed Argentina among the few countries that applied that technology since at that time it had only been tested in Europe and the United States. But it was not until 1853, when the national government contracted gas-powered public lighting for the cobblestone streets located near the Plaza de Mayo, when the effective use of gas began. It was still in this early period of the industry, referring to manufactured gas, such as that from coal, given that natural gas from deposits had not yet been exploited.

The company was founded in 1853 in Buenos Aires, and its gas holder was located in the area of Retiro, in the current Tower Monumental. The company was dedicated in its origins in provide the public lighting of the city. In 1895 the company began to carry out the works to supply electrical energy to the city of Buenos Aires. In 1897, the Board of the Primitiva acquired the Sociedad de Luz Eléctrica Edison, the main electrical plant of the city. By those times, Retiro was located very close to Río de la Plata, which allowed a quick transport of coal (imported from the United Kingdom) from barges to the plant.

Once the gas was produced, it was transported to consumption points through clay slab pipelines that crisscrossed the area that was already known at that time as "el Bajo" (the lower part of the city): San Martín, Florida, Del Parque (now Lavalle), 25 de Mayo, De la Piedad (now Bartolomé Mitre) streets, including La Recova and Plaza de Mayo. This major advancement, which represented the lighting of the city's most important streets, was followed by the gas lighting of landmarks such as the Cabildo, the Metropolitan Cathedral, the City Hall, the Recova, and Teatro Argentino building.

The gas lighting system continued to develop with great success, expanding very rapidly, first to other neighborhoods in Buenos Aires near the city center and then also to other nearby cities such as Bernal in Avellaneda Partido, and other distant ones such as San Nicolás, Bahía Blanca, Rosario, La Plata, in Buenos Aires Province.

The Primitiva was dedicated to the electric Lighting of Buenos Aires until 1920. year in which it lost the concession.

The Compañía Primitiva de Gas de Buenos Aires Ltda registered its name in 1901, and changed its original name in 1910 as Primitiva Gas and Electric Lighting Company of Buenos Aires. In 1901 the company's capital was £1,200,000 sterling.

In 1944 the national government decreed the nationalization of Compañía Primitiva de Gas. The company ceased its functions on March 5, 1945, taking charge of the management of the expropriated company Yacimientos Petrolíferos Fiscales.

The Primitiva Gas Company of Buenos Aires came to provide gas to a total of 240,000 users until its nationalization in 1945, distributing gas to the areas of Buenos Aires, La Plata, Bahia Blanca and Rosario. The company also counted on a fleet of trucks and motorcycles to provide care to its users.

In 1945, the government of Argentina led by Juan Perón, took over the Compañía Primitiva prior the nationalisation of the service with the creation of "Gas del Estado", a state-owned company which became Compañía Primitiva's successor.
