= Plaza Fuerza Aérea Argentina =

Public square in Buenos Aires, Argentina

- City square
- {{{other_names}}}
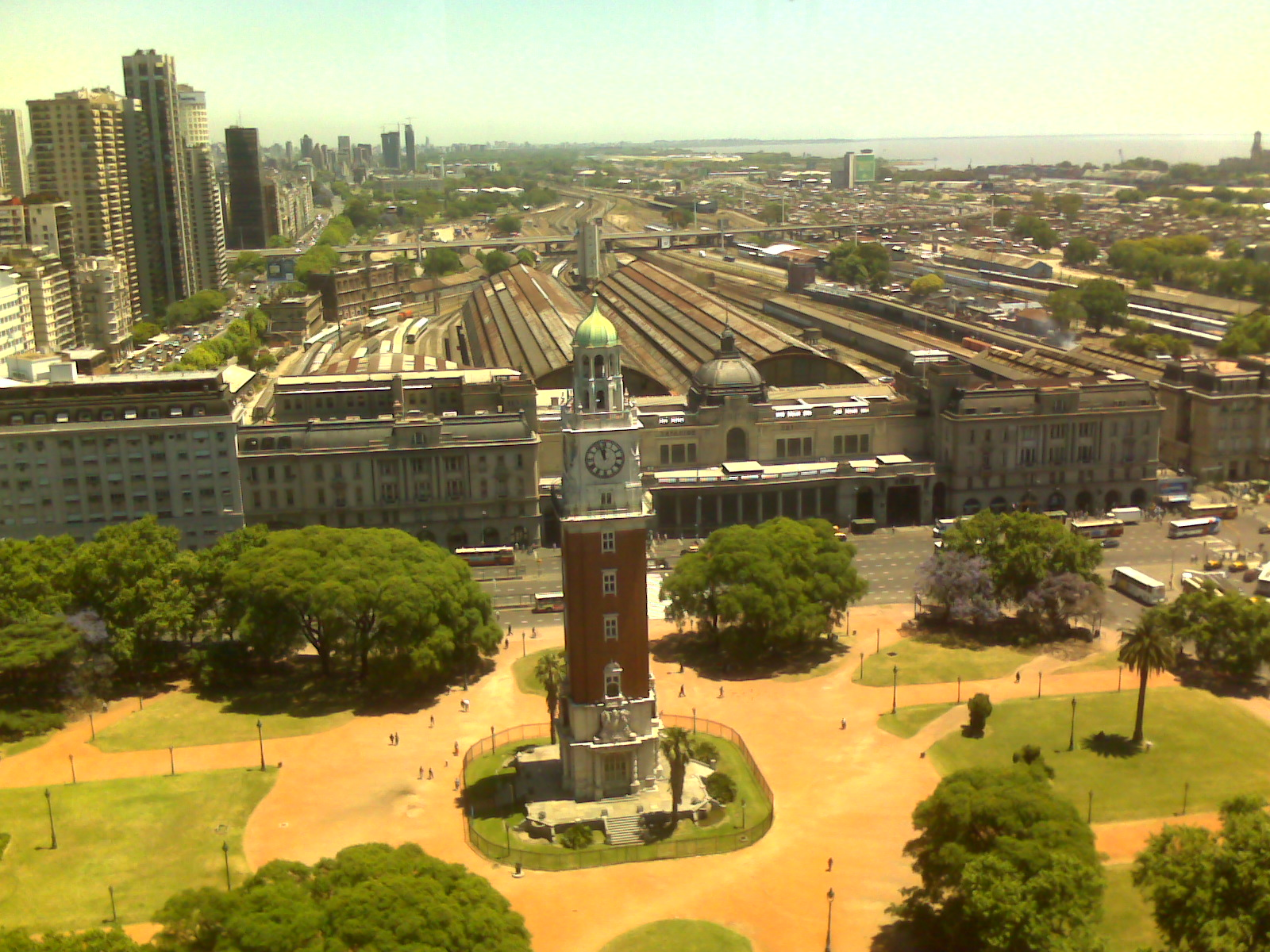
- Plaza Fuerza Aérea Argentina, with the Torre Monumental in the center and the Retiro railway station in the background.
- Features: Torre Monumental; Surrounded by the Retiro railway station on Avenida Dr. José María Ramos Mejía, Avenida San Martín and Avenida del Libertador.
- Location: Retiro; Buenos Aires, Argentina
- Location of Fuerza Aérea Argentina in Buenos Aires
- Coordinates: 34°35′32″S 58°22′25″W

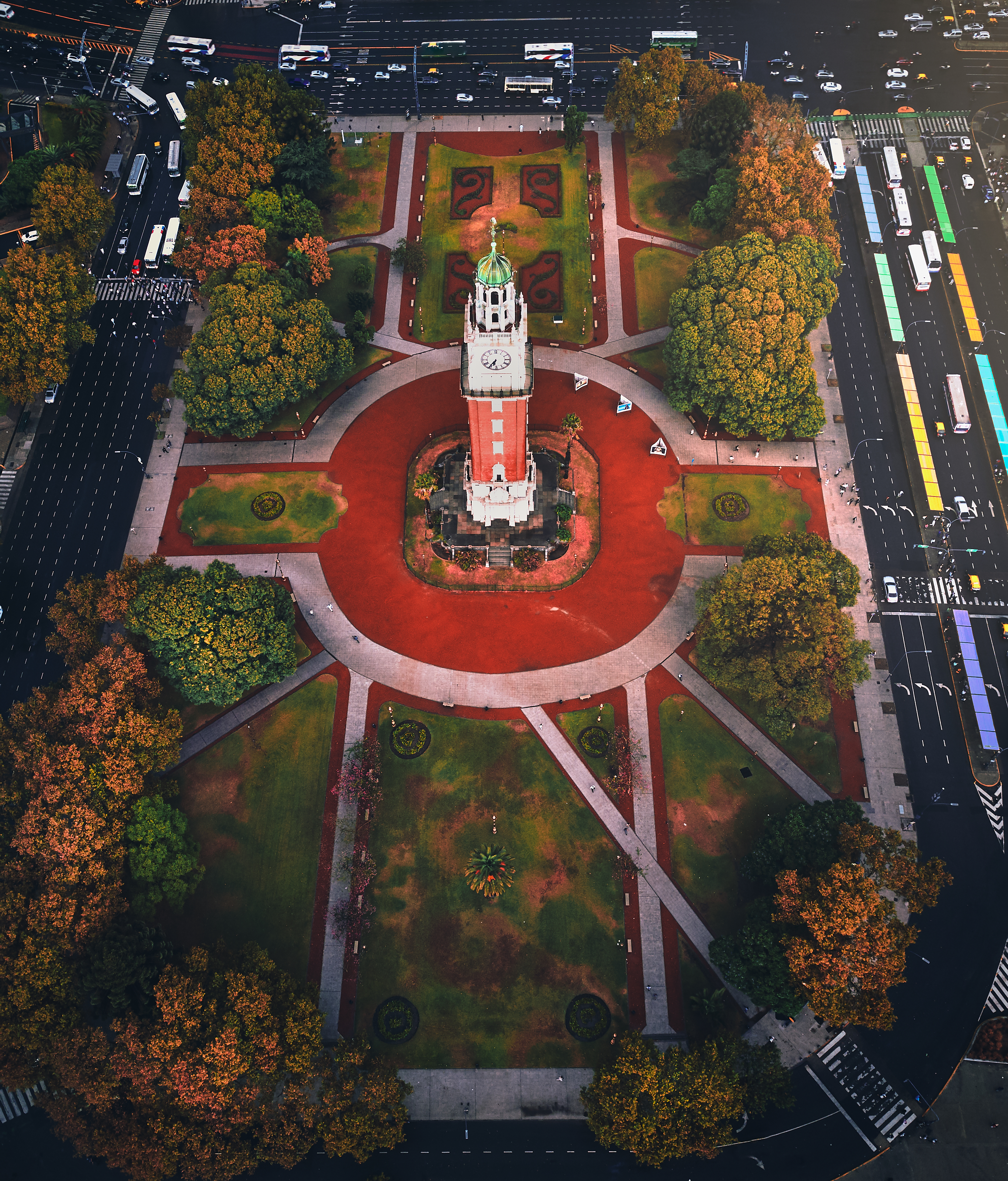
Aerial view of the square, with the Torre Monumental in the center.

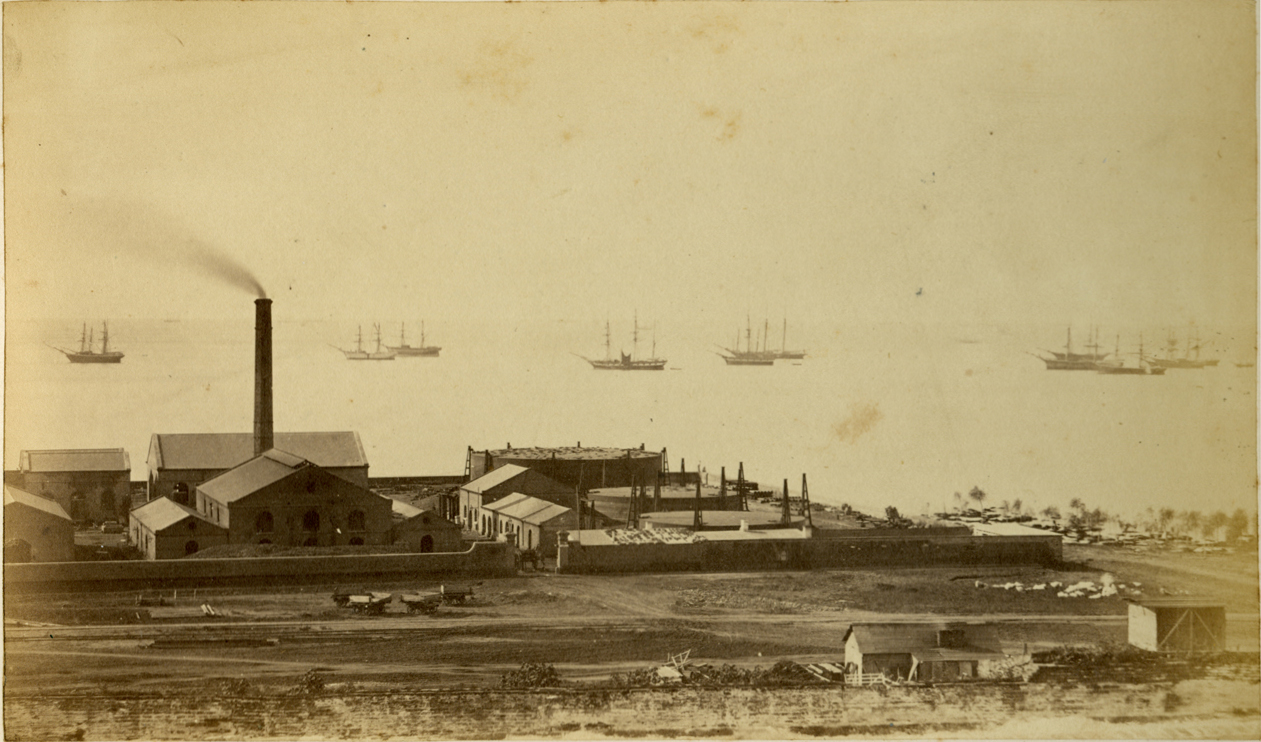
Between 1853 and 1912, a gas factory that supplied the city, was located in the same place. Photo by Esteban Gonnet, 1864.

Plaza Fuerza Aérea Argentina (Spanish for "Argentine Air Force Square") is a square located in the barrio (district) of Retiro in Buenos Aires, Argentina. The square is located between the Retiro railway station on Avenida Dr. José María Ramos Mejía, Avenida San Martín and Avenida del Libertador. It was designed and built in the 1940s and inaugurated on January 4, 1945. Originally called Plaza Británica ("British Square"), its name was changed in 1982 to the current one, by paying homage to the Argentine Air Force after the Falklands War, which was its first war against an external enemy. However, some still refer to it by its old name and also Plaza de los Ingleses ("English Square"), although the latter name was never used officially. The Torre Monumental (formerly "Torre de los Ingleses"), is located in the center of the square.
