= Ambrose Poynter =

British architect

- Born: 16 May 1796; London, England
- Died: 20 November 1886 (aged 90)
- Occupation: Architect

Ambrose Poynter (16 May 1796 – 20 November 1886) was a British architect. He was one of the founding members of the Institute of British Architects in 1834.

== Early life ==
Born in London on 16 May 1796, he was second son of Ambrose Lyon Poynter by Thomasine Anne Peck; the family was of Huguenot origin. Poynter was employed by John Nash from 1814 to 1818. In 1819–21, he travelled to Italy, Sicily, and the Ionian Islands. He was present at John Keats's funeral in Rome on 26 February 1821.

== Architectural practice ==
Poynter set up for himself as an architect in London, initially at 1 Poets' Corner, Westminster. About 1846 he built for himself a house and offices in Park Street, now Queen Anne's Gate, also in Westminster. He became noted for his Palladian and Tudor Gothic fusion architecture including the relocated Hospital and Chapel of St Katharine, Regent's Park, London in 1826–7, and St Katharine's Lodge (its later name) for its Master, Herbert Taylor, along with Christ Church, Broadway (1841-1844).

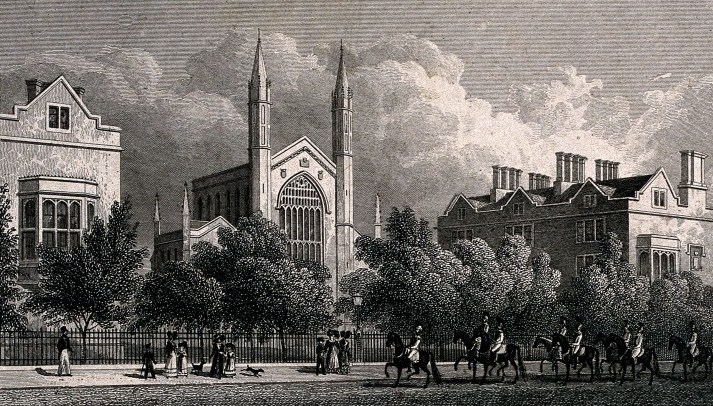
Royal Hospital of St Katharine, Regent's Park, London, 1827 engraving. The chapel is now the Danish Church.

Poynter designed a trio of churches in Cambridge, notable bright red brick buildings: Christ Church, Newmarket Road in 1837–39; the Church of St Andrew the Great on St Andrew's Road in 1842–43, and St Paul's on Hills Road in 1841. St Paul's was the target of criticism from the Cambridge Camden Society, in the first issue (November 1841) of its journal, the Ecclesiologist. While some of the society's members found the attack embarrassing, it was supported by Augustus Pugin. The issue was withdrawn, but an offer then to review another of the Poynter churches was not conciliatory, with St Paul's being called a "cheap church"; in 1843 the Church of St Andrew was called "miserable and meagre".

In 1851, Poynter was hired by Sir Stafford Northcote, 1st Earl of Iddesleigh to make additions to Pynes House near Exeter, Devon, including a ceremonial entrance hall in 1852. He also made additions to Warwick Castle and Crewe Hall.

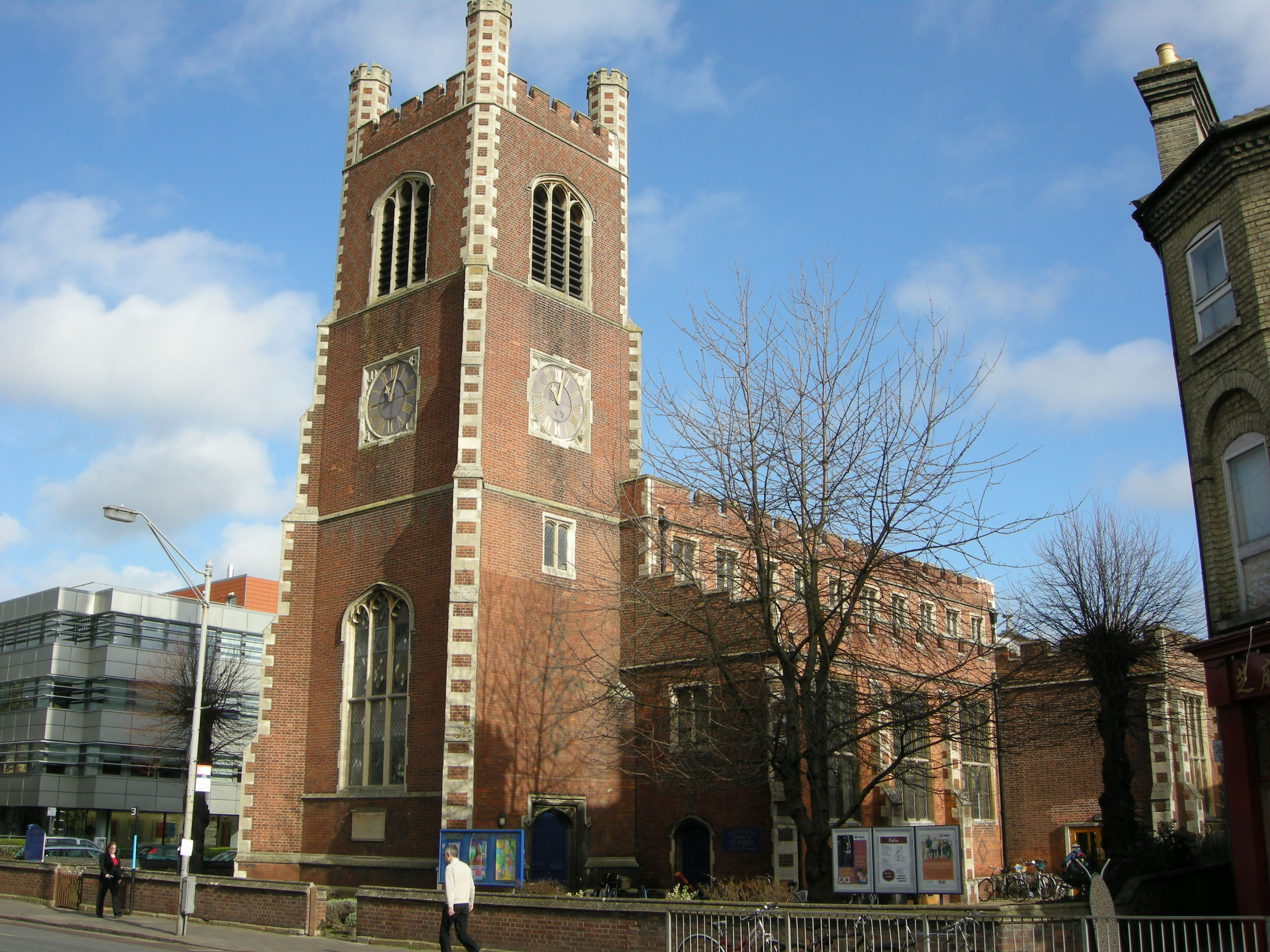
St Paul's Church, Hills Road, Cambridge

== Artist and illustrator ==
Poynter lived in Paris between 1830 and 1832, where Lavinia Forster (his mother-in-law from 1832) provided a social centre for artists. They included William Callow and Richard Parkes Bonington, as well as the sculptor Henri de Triqueti who had married another daughter. Poynter sketched with, and studied watercolour painting under, Thomas Shotter Boys, who was a lifelong friend. He was an architectural draughtsman, and provided illustrations and articles in Charles Knight's Pictorial History of England (1837–44), and his edition of Shakespeare. He was a member of the Arundel Society and the Graphic Society. A student also of heraldry, he made drawings to illustrate Francis Sandford's Genealogical History of England.

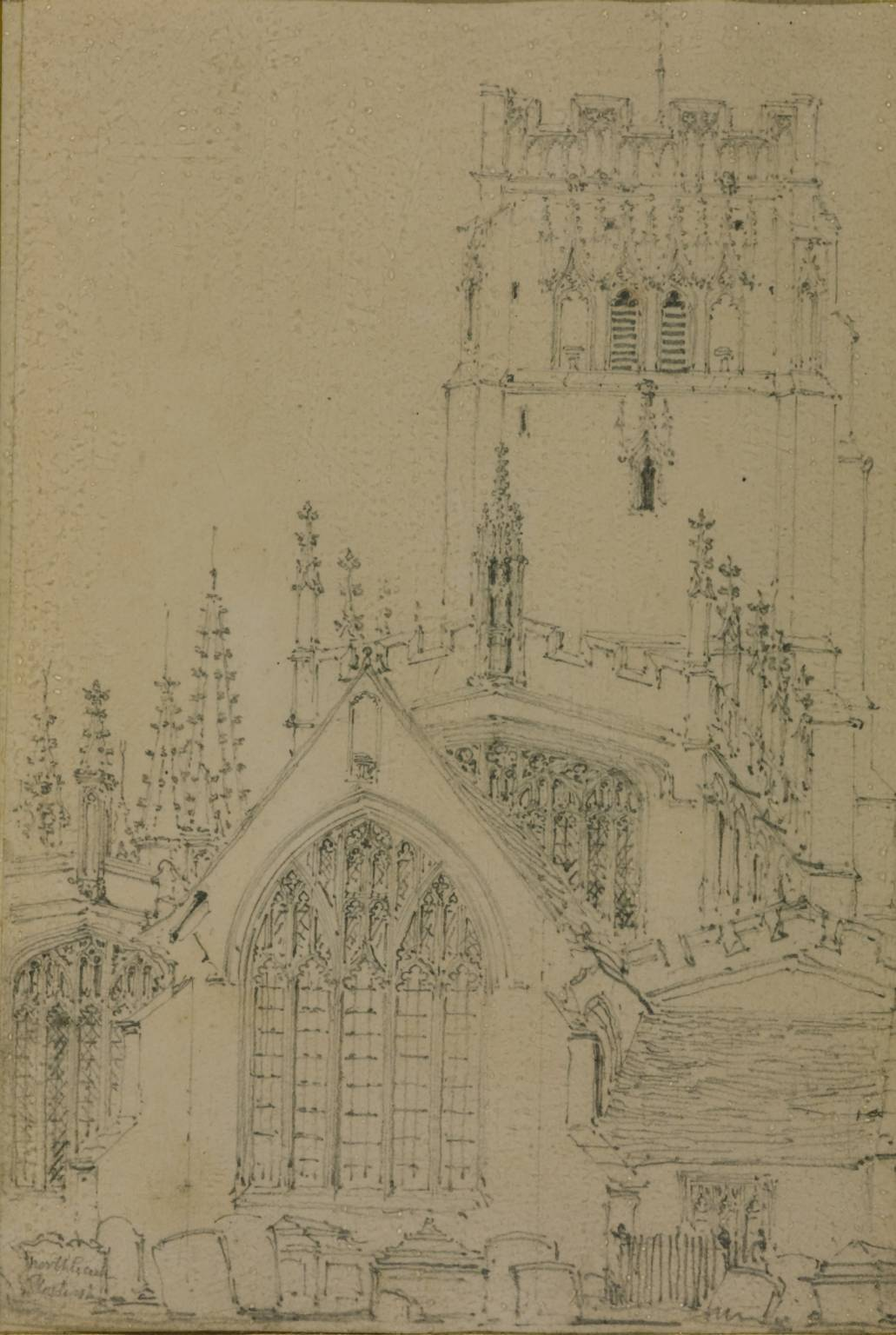
Ambrose Poynter, drawing of Northleach Church

== Later life ==
In the mid-1840s, while serving in the capacity of the Official Referee of Metropolitan buildings, Poynter became Professor of Fine Arts at King's College London. From 1845 to 1848, he was an inspector of the design schools but was criticised for his often contradictory reports. He served as secretary of the Institute of British Architects in 1840, 1841, and 1844, and also as its vice-president.

In 1858, Poynter developed an eye affection which led to his total blindness, and some of his commissions were taken over by William Burges. He died at his home in 3 Marine Place, Dover on 20 November 1886 and was reportedly buried in Kensal Green, London.

== Personal life ==
Poynter married Emma Forster (1800–1848), a granddaughter of the sculptor, Thomas Banks. Their daughter Clara Bell (1834–1927) was a noted translator. Their son, Sir Edward John Poynter (1836–1919), an artist, married Agnes MacDonald, sister to Georgiana Burne-Jones and Alice Kipling; Edward and Agnes's son Sir Ambrose Macdonald Poynter (1867–1923) was a calligrapher and architect.

Poynter married secondly in 1850.
