= Ambrose Macdonald Poynter =

British artist

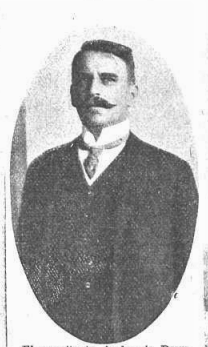
- portrait of Ambrose Macdonald Poynter

Personal details
- Born: 1867 Bloomsbury, England
- Died: 1923 (aged 55–56) London, England
- Profession: architect

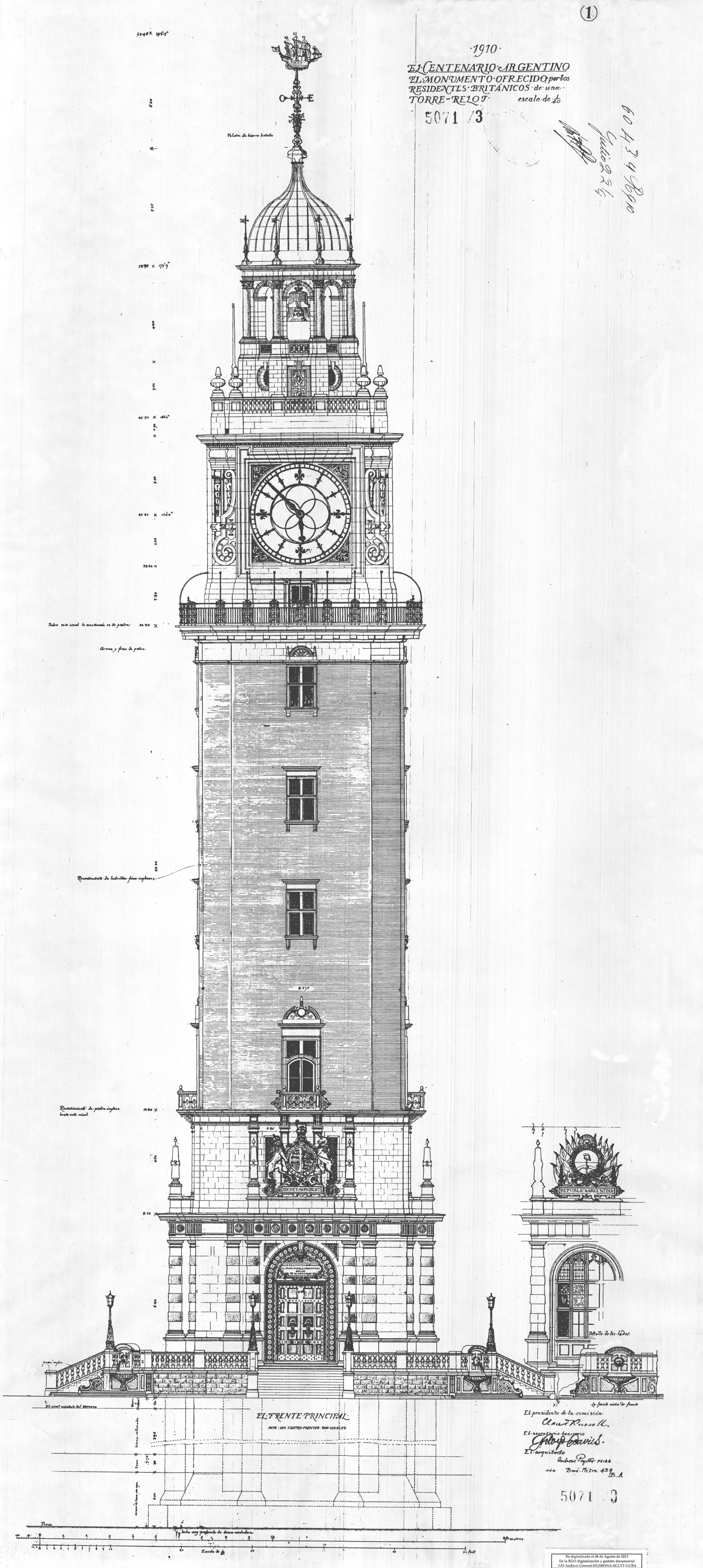
Plan of Torre Monumental in Buenos Aires (1910)

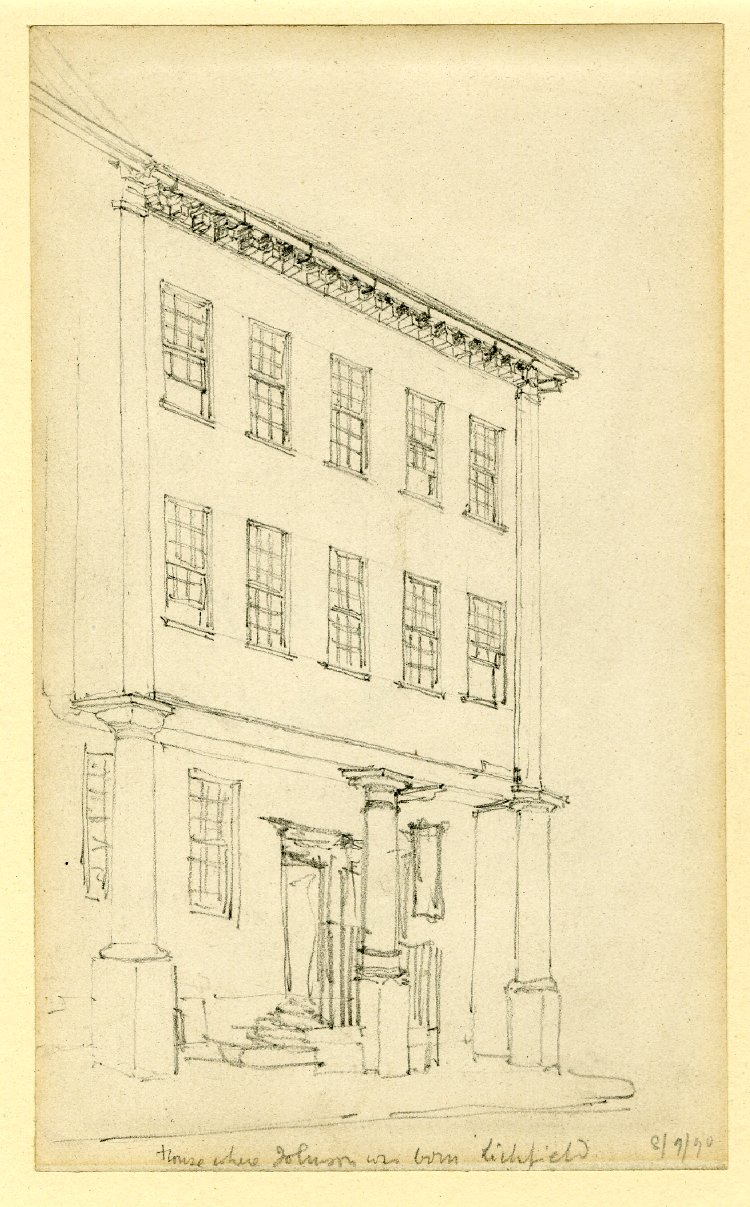
Sketch of the house in which Dr Johnson was born in Lichfield (1890)

Sir Ambrose Macdonald Poynter (26 September 1867 – 31 May 1923) was a British calligrapher, artist and architect.

Poynter was born at 24 Gower Street, Bloomsbury, London. He was eldest son of Sir Edward John Poynter (1836–1919), and grandson of architect Ambrose Poynter (1796–1886). His mother was Agnes (1843–1906), one of the famed Macdonald sisters.

Poynter designed the Torre Monumental in Retiro, Buenos Aires, that was opened in 1916 and from his teens produced a number of drawings, some of which are now located in the British Museum.
