= Christ Church, Broadway =

Church in the City of Westminster, London, England

Coordinates: 51.4983°N 0.1344°W

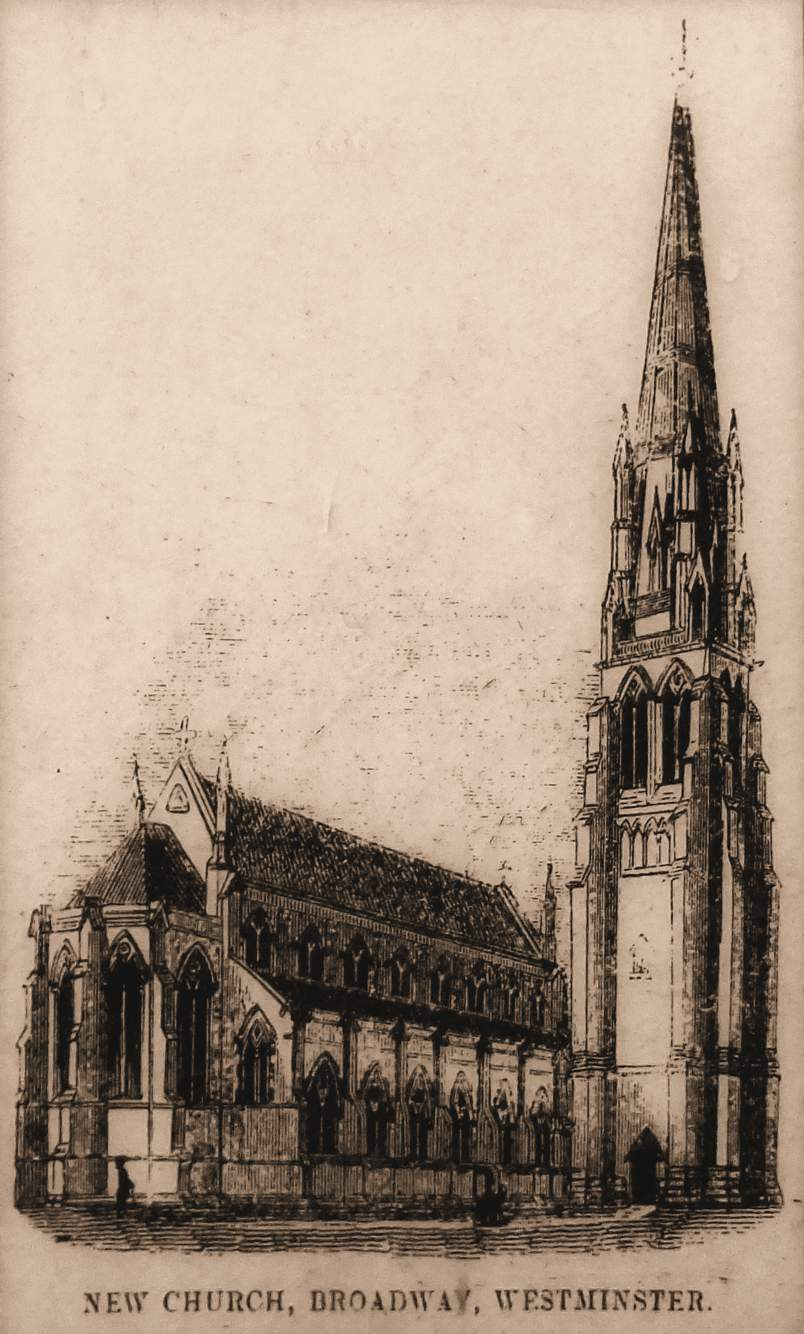
Christ Church, Broadway, Westminster, from The Churches of the Metropolis, published 1707-1842

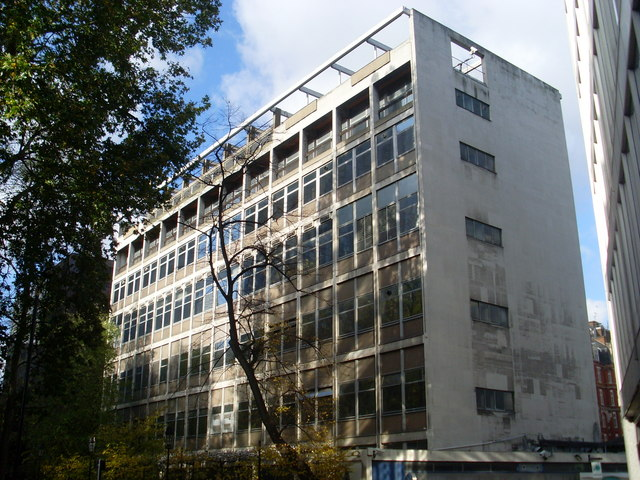
Westminster Telephone Exchange on the church's former site.

Christ Church, Broadway was a Church of England church in the City of Westminster, London.

== History ==
It was built in 1638–1642 as a chapel of ease on part of what since 1625 had been a burial ground for St Margaret, Westminster, whose burials including Thomas Blood and Wenceslaus Hollar. It was renamed Christ Church and replaced with a building designed by Ambrose Poynter between 1841 and 1844. Its baptismal records from 1843 to 1941 and marriage records from 1876 to 1947 survive at the City of Westminster Archives Centre.

It was almost entirely destroyed on 17 April 1941 during the London Blitz - the ruins were demolished post-war, followed by the tower in 1954. The site was sold off in 1946 and the parish merged with that of St Peter, Eaton Square.
