= Retiro, Buenos Aires =

Coordinates: 34°35′41″S 58°22′33″W

Retiro
- Neighborhood
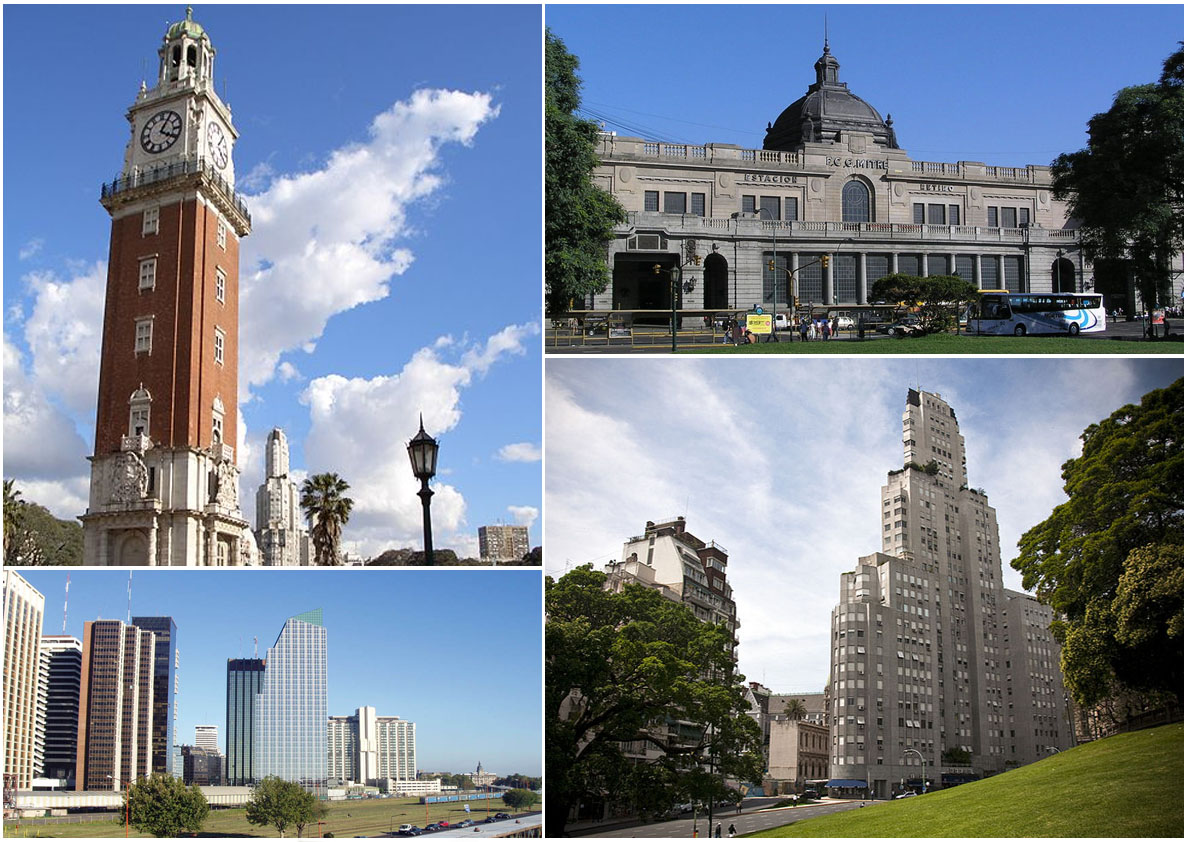
- Clockwise from top: The Torre Monumental, the Retiro Railway Station, Catalinas Norte in the Central Business District and the Kavanagh Building with the Plaza San Martín.
- Location of Retiro within Buenos Aires
- Country: Argentina
- Autonomous city: Buenos Aires
- Comuna: C1
- Important sites: Retiro Railway Station, Calle Florida, Plaza San Martín

Area
  - Total: 2.8 km^{2} (1.1 sq mi)

Population (2001)
  - Total: 45,002
  - Density: 16,000/km^{2} (42,000/sq mi)
- Time zone: UTC-3 (ART)

Retiro is a barrio or neighborhood in Buenos Aires, Argentina. Located facing the River Plate estuary, Retiro is bordered on the south by the Puerto Madero and San Nicolás, and on the west by the Recoleta.

== History ==
Towards the end of the 17th century and the beginning of the 18th century, an asiento of slaves belonging to the Compagnie de Guinée and South Sea Company was installed in the area, which operated until 1739.

The construction of Plaza de Toros del Retiro, a bullfighting arena designed by the architect Francisco Cañete, began in 1800. The arena functioned until 1819. The battles between the troops of Santiago de Liniers and the British army, occurred during the English invasions of 1806 and 1807 happened at the Plaza de los Toros.

The first dissident cemetery of Buenos Aires, located in the vicinity of Iglesia Nuestra Señora del Socorro was built in 1821. In this cemetery people who professed the Protestant religion, mostly English, were buried. The dissident cemetery operated in the neighborhood of Retiro until 1833, and was transferred that same year to the neighborhood of Balvanera.

The Compañía Primitiva de Gas de Buenos Aires Ltda., a British gas company until it was nationalized in 1944, was established in the neighborhood in 1854.

In 1910, the British residents of Buenos Aires financed the construction of the Torre de los Ingleses (renamed in 1982 to Torre Monumental), on the occasion of the centenary of the May Revolution. The work was entrusted to the English architect Ambrose Macdonald Poynter, being inaugurated by the president Victorino de la Plaza on May 24, 1916 .

== Urban character ==
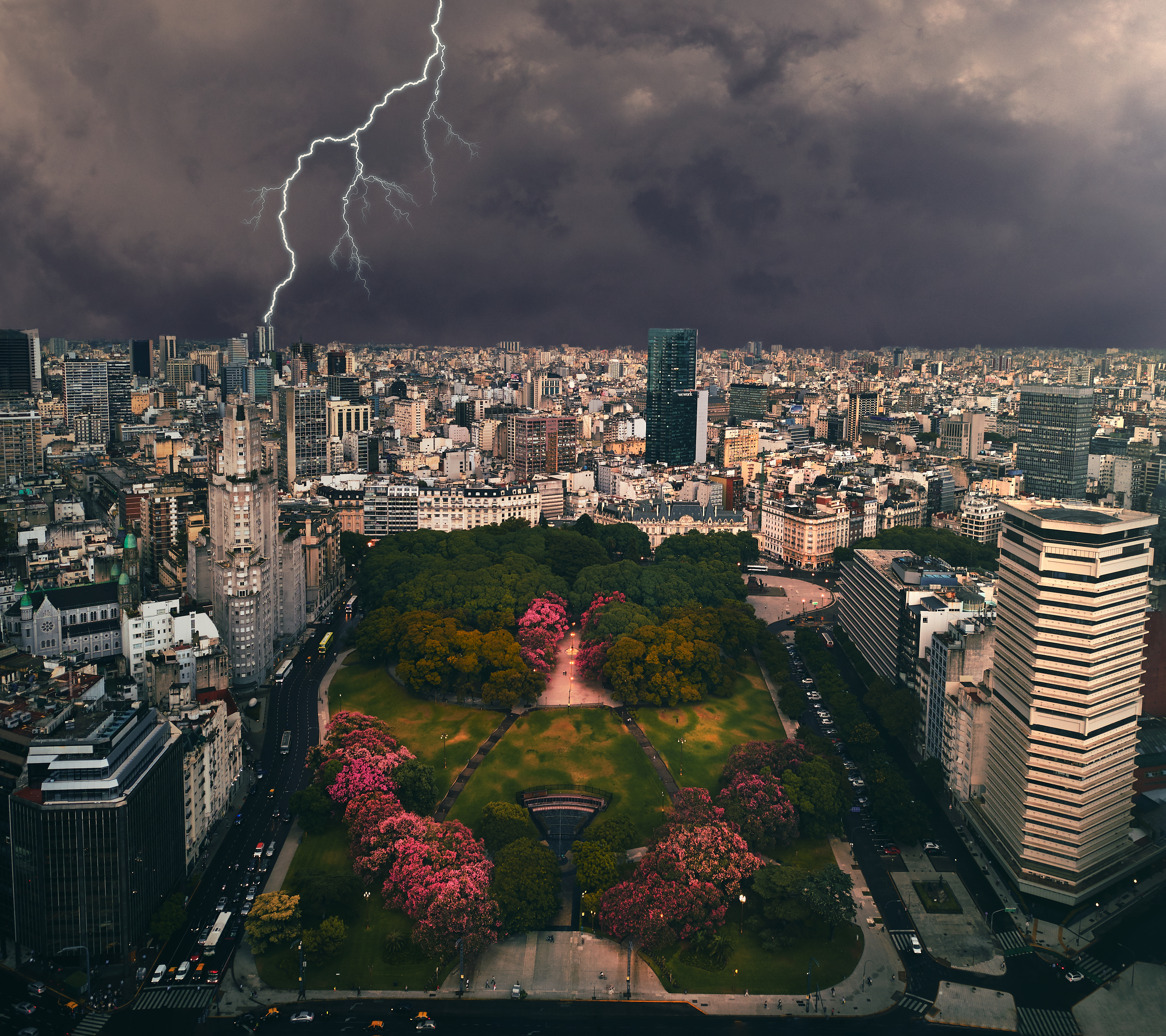
Aerial view of Plaza San Martín and its surroundings.

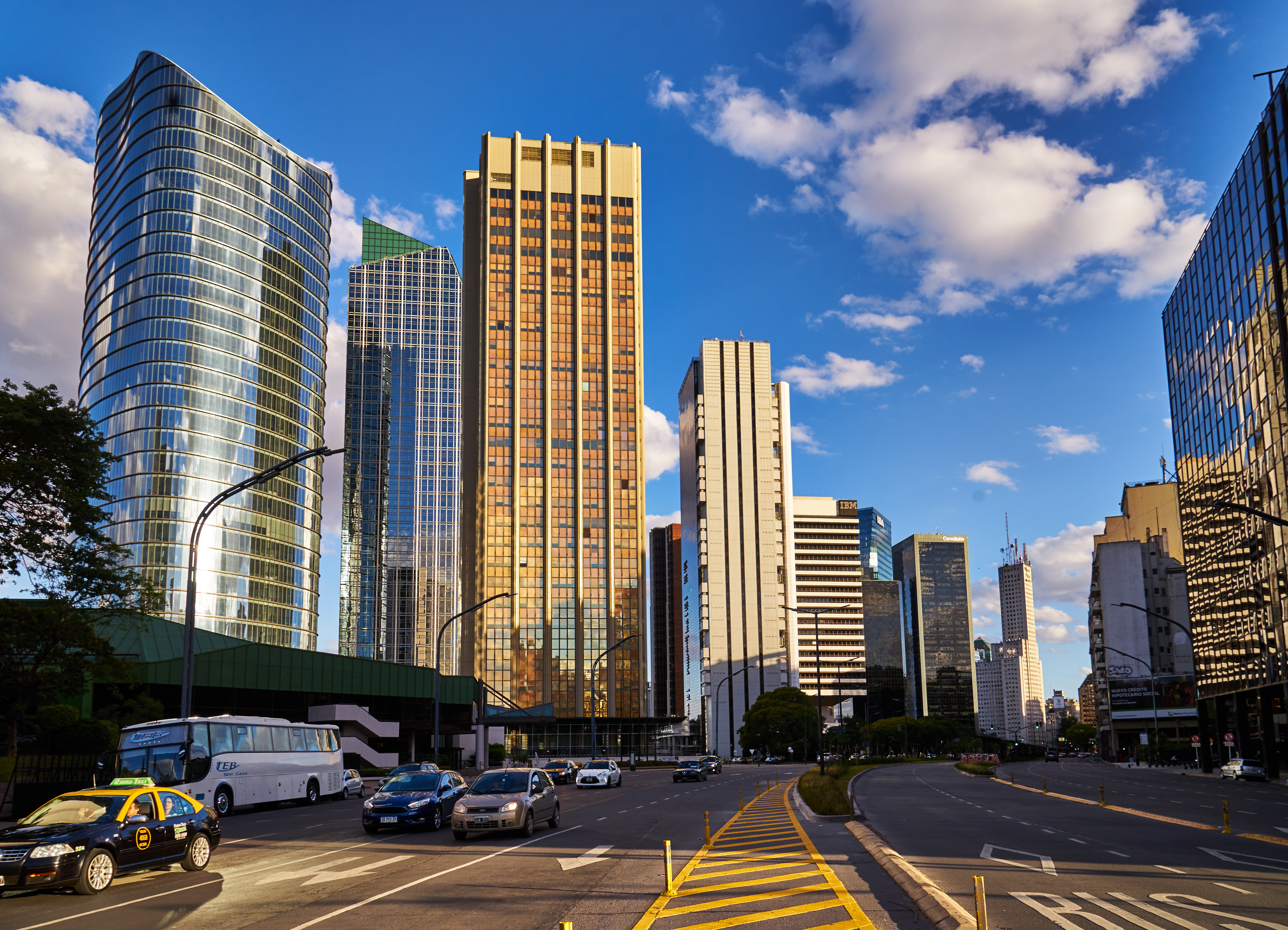
The northern end of Avenida Leandro N. Alem.

Retiro is one of the main transportation hubs in Argentina, and is home to many high-end stores and residential areas popular among both local wealthy gentry and expatriate executives. About 26,000 of its people, however, including thousands of immigrants, live in the "Villa 31" shantytown built along the Port of Buenos Aires from the 1930s onwards. Local and long-distance rail service heading to the north originate from Estación Retiro (Retiro train terminal), also a major long-distance bus terminal (Terminal de Ómnibus) is located adjacent to the station, subte line C of the Buenos Aires Metro system and numerous local public bus services, this area is always teeming with commuters and traffic on weekdays.

A major thoroughfare is Avenida del Libertador, which becomes Avenida Leandro N. Alem beyond the Retiro train terminal. Avenida Leandro Alem runs north-to-south along the Buenos Aires Central Business District, which Retiro shares with the San Nicolás ward; the Retiro section of the business district is centered on the Catalinas Norte office park, initially built in the 1970s over docklands developed a century earlier by Francisco Seeber. Other principal streets and avenues in Retiro are Santa Fe, Córdoba, and Libertador Avenues, pedestrian Calle Florida, and Avenida 9 de Julio.

The Retiro section of Calle Florida was the site of Harrods Buenos Aires, originally the London department store's only overseas affiliate, from 1914 to 1998; the abandoned landmark continued to host art shows and Tango festivals, and permits were obtained in 2009 to reopen the retailer. Another Retiro landmark spared demolition was the Ortiz Basualdo Palace. Completed in 1912 as a private residence, it was acquired by the French Government for use as its Embassy in Argentina in 1939. When entire blocks of housing were razed to make way for an extension of the Avenida 9 de Julio in the late 1970s, the embassy was spared due to its landmark status, and remains the lone building in the midst of intense traffic. The neighboring Pereda Palace, built in 1920, serves as the official residence of the Ambassador of Brazil.

Retiro is home to a number of five star hotels, including the Four Seasons, Marriott Plaza, Sheraton, and Sofitel. The oldest of these, the Marriott Plaza, was opened in 1909 and faces Plaza San Martín, to the north of which lies the train terminal and the Plaza Fuerza Aérea Argentina (formerly Plaza Británica), where the Torre Monumental (formerly Torre de los Ingleses) is located; the palladian monument was donated by the Anglo-Argentine community for the 1910 centennial celebrations, and suffered several acts of sabotage in the wake of the 1982 Falklands War. Also nearby are the Basílica Santísimo Sacramento, the upscale Patio Bullrich shopping arcade, the Estrugamou Building, the Fernández Blanco Museum, and the Peace Plaza - the site of the former Israeli Embassy, which was bombed on March 17, 1992, with a toll of 29 dead and 242 wounded, marking the first known South American incident of Middle East-related terrorism.

The numerous government agencies headquartered in the district include the Ministry of Foreign Relations, the Air Force, the Navy, the National Mint, and the Rail Transport Agency; the former Hotel de Inmigrantes, the primary point of entry for millions of immigrants from 1911 to 1953, is also in Retiro and today serves as a national museum.

=== Plaza San Martín ===
Across the street opposite Retiro train terminal is the leafy Plaza San Martín, surrounded by great palaces and hotels. The Retiro lowlands were once the training grounds for General José de San Martín's Regiment of Mounted Grenadiers, and the modern-day Plaza San Martín features an equestrian monument to the hero of the Argentine War of Independence, as well as a memorial to the dead in the Malvinas War.

The most significant landmark opposite the plaza is the Kavanagh Building, a reinforced concrete structure finished in 1936 which was, at the time, the tallest building in Latin America at 120 metres (394 ft). Funded by an Irish Argentine woman, the Kavanagh stands on the northern end of pedestrian Calle Florida, and its construction followed the plaza's extensive redesign, which resulted in the demolition of a number of derelict buildings from the colonial era, though also of the original National Museum of Fine Arts, an ornate pavilion used for the 1889 Paris Exposition. Other architecturally significant landmarks facing the plaza include the Paz Palace, the San Martín Palace, and the Olivetti and Pirelli skyscrapers, which were among the first in the city built in the International Style.

District of Retiro
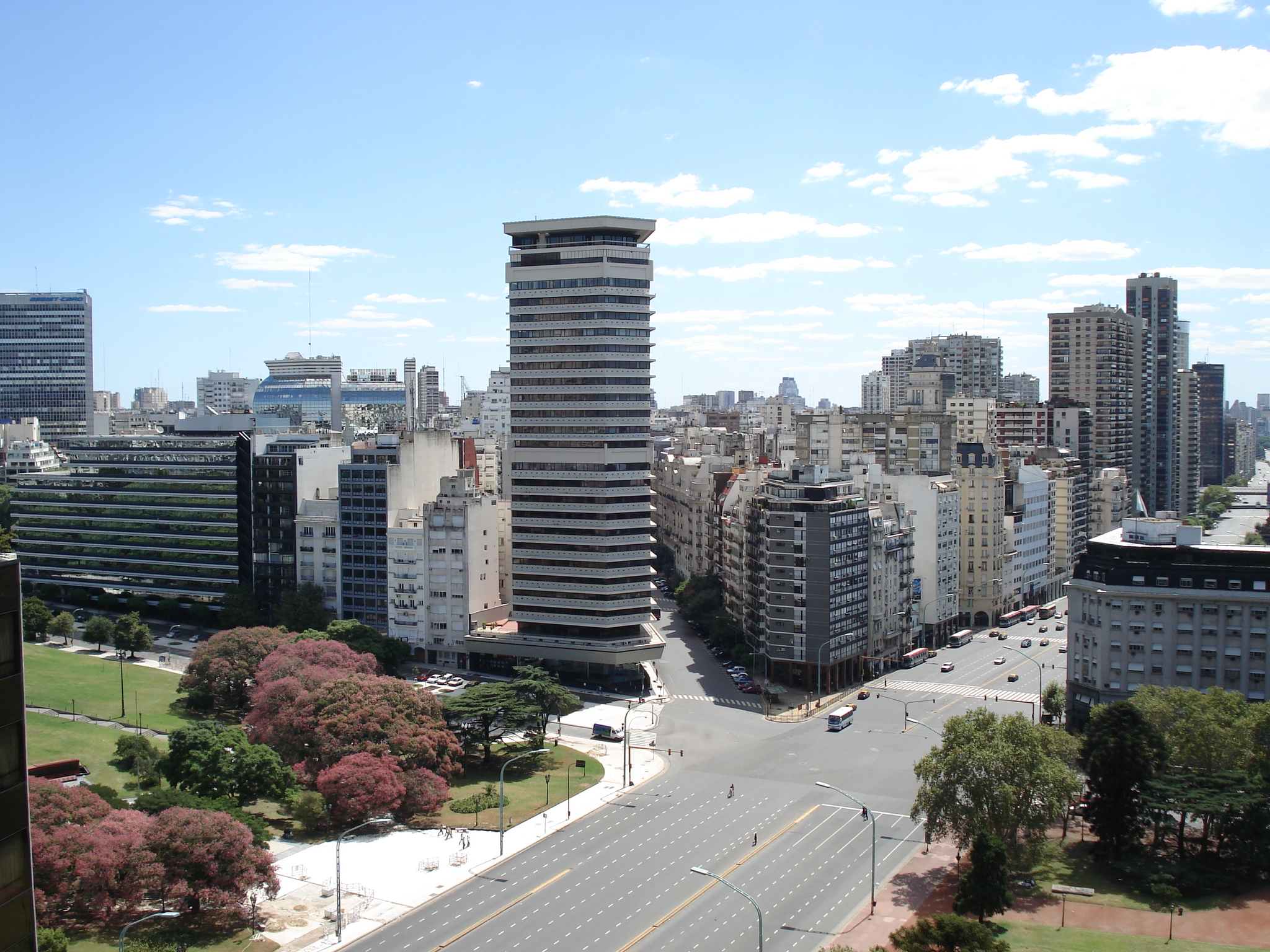
Avenida del Libertador

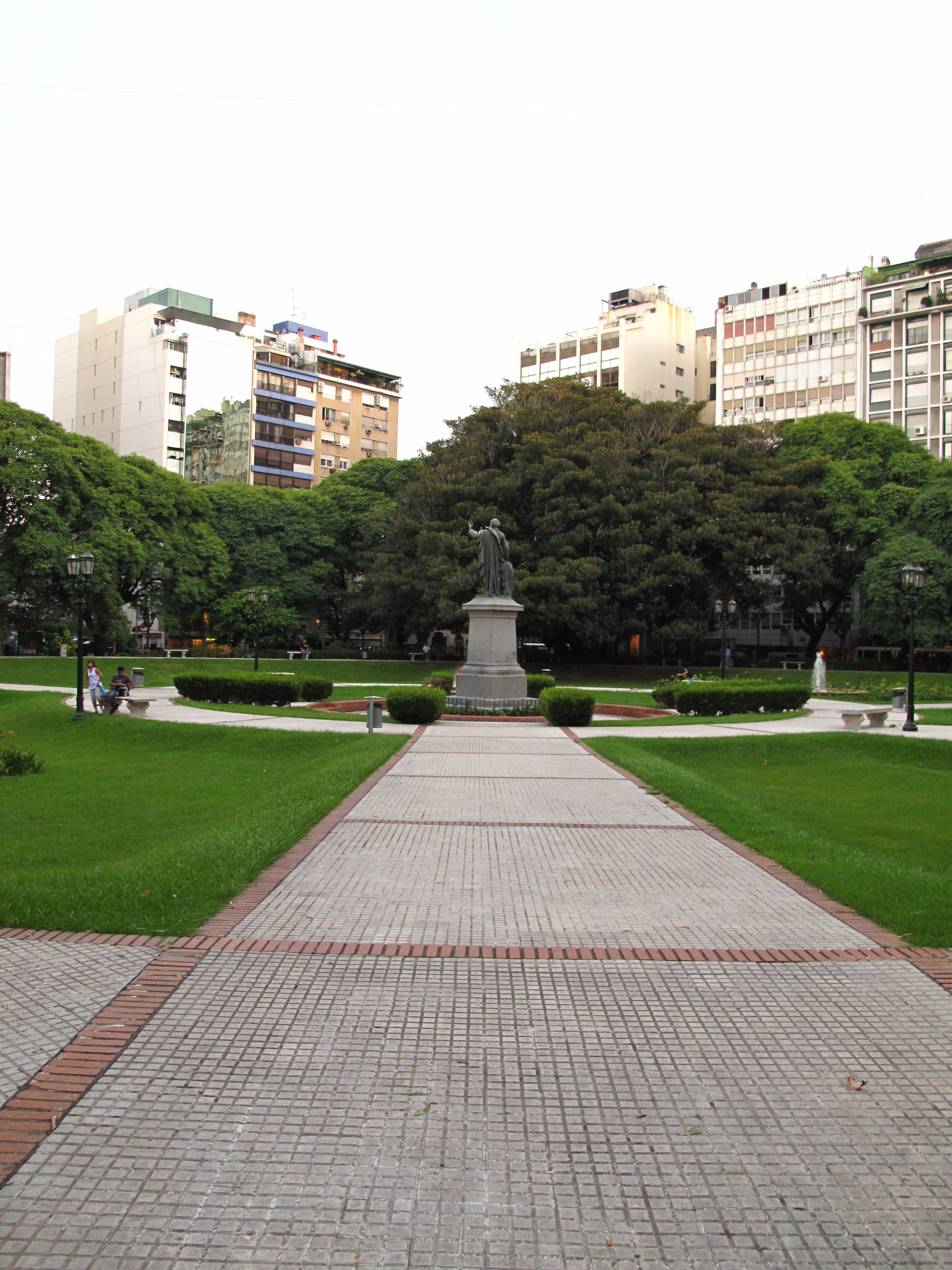
Plaza Libertad

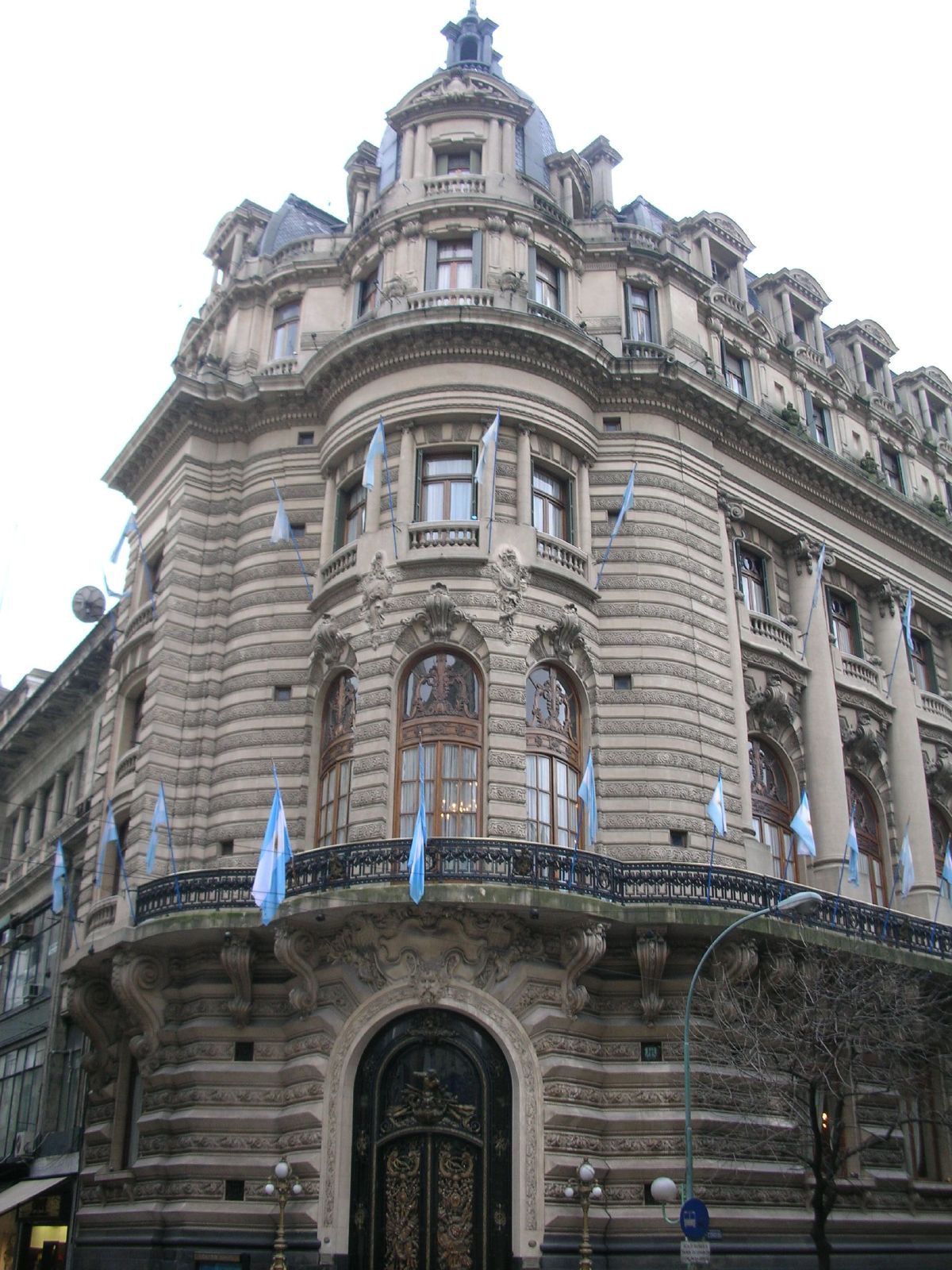
Navy Officers' Club, Córdoba Avenue

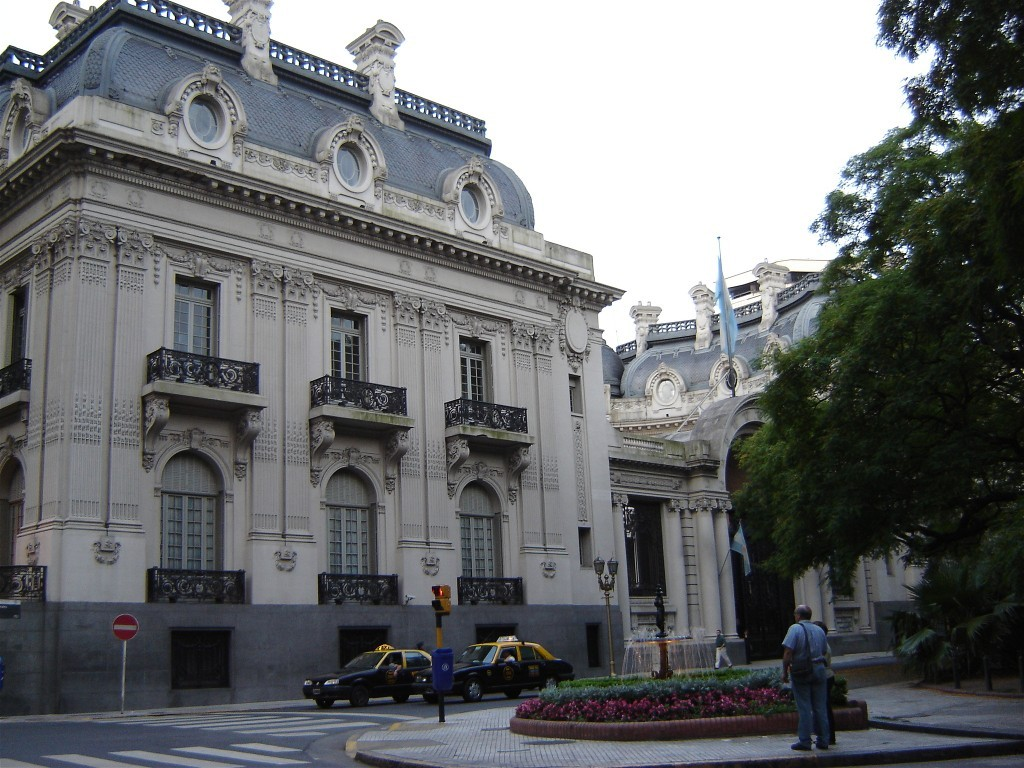
San Martín Palace

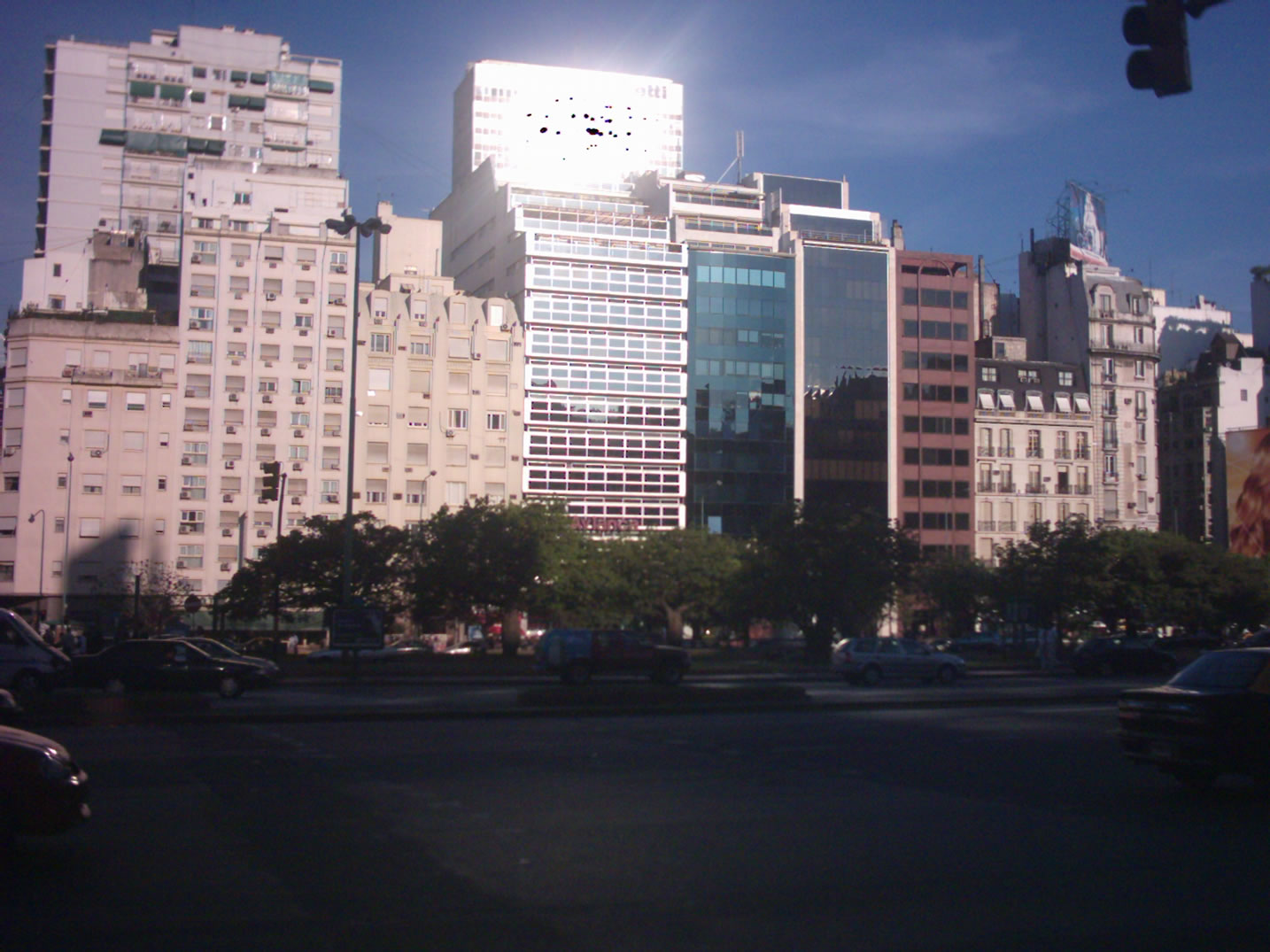
Avenida 9 de Julio

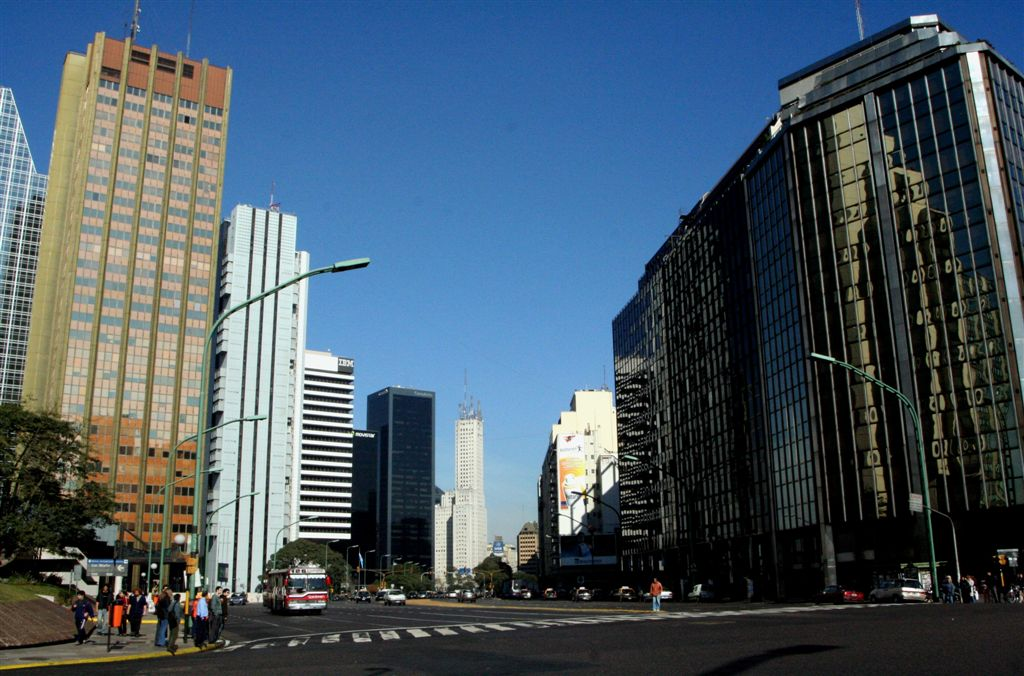
Avenida Leandro N. Alem

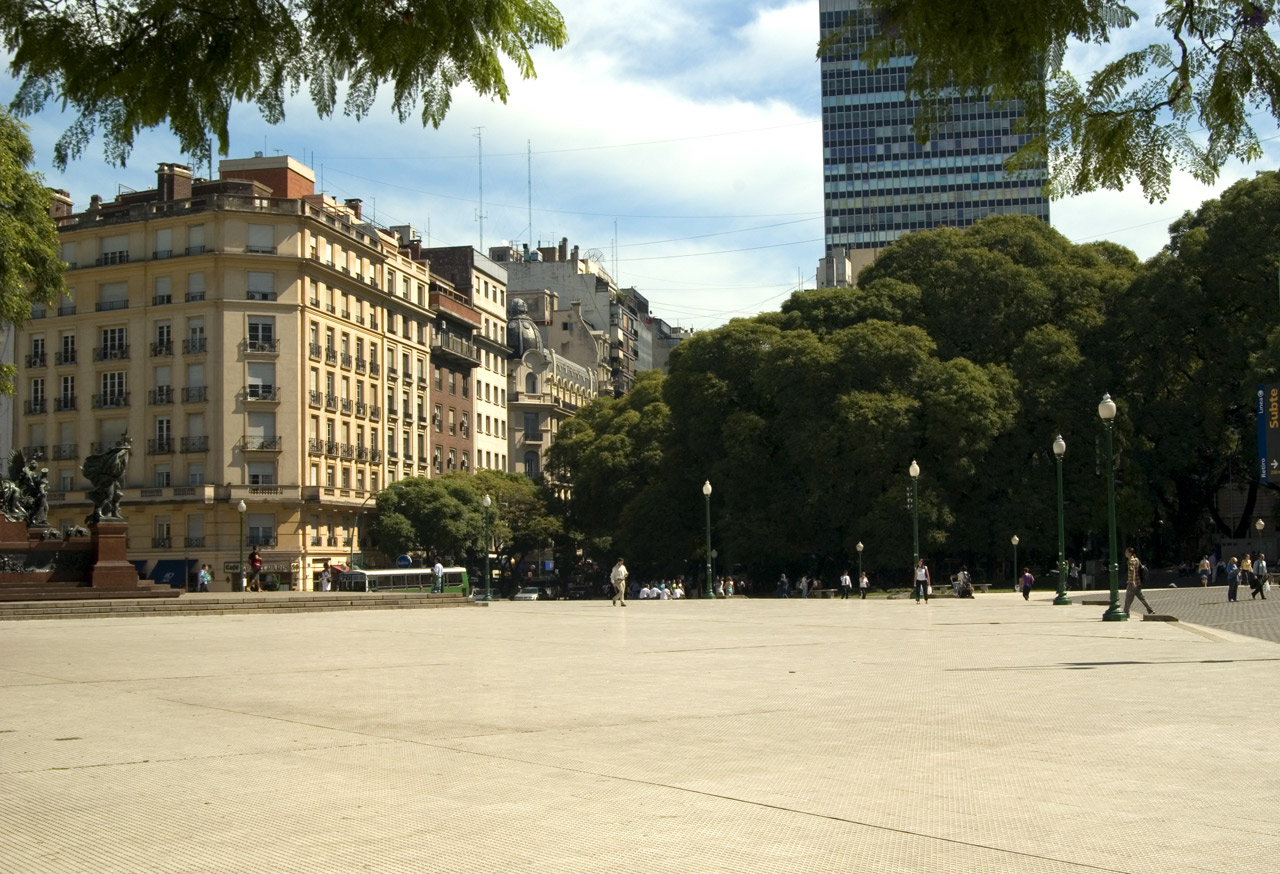
Plaza San Martín
