= Four Seasons Hotel Buenos Aires =

Hotel in Buenos Aires, Argentina

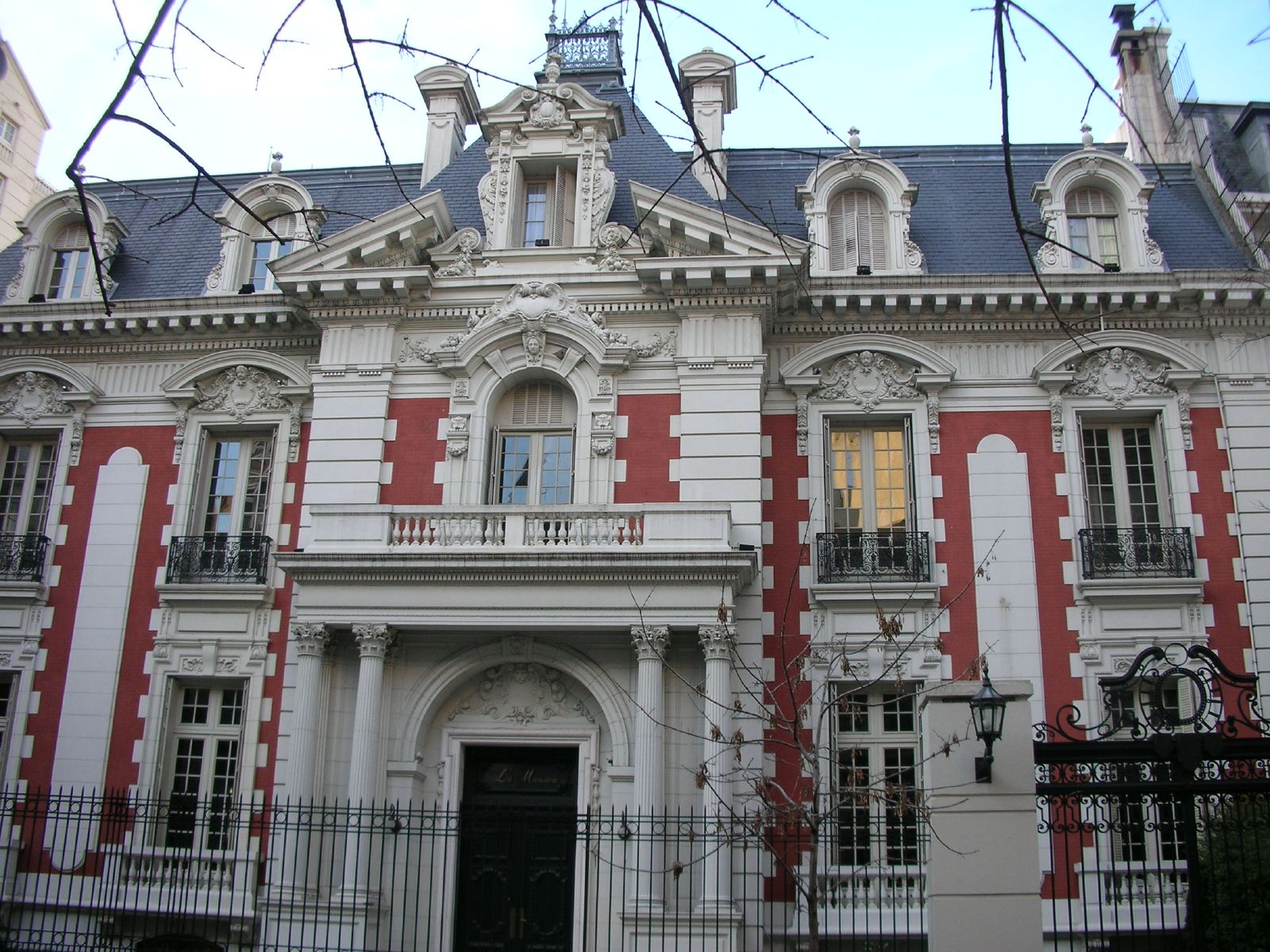
- The former Álzaga Unzué mansion is the hotel's annex
- Interactive map of the Four Seasons Hotel Buenos Aires area

General information
- Location: Posadas 1086, C1011 CABA, Argentina
- Coordinates: 34°35′27″S 58°22′58″W
- Opening: April 1992
- Management: Four Seasons Hotels and Resorts

Technical details
- Floor count: 12 (Tower), 3 (Mansion)

Other information
- Number of rooms: 165 (including 49 suites)

Website
- Official website

The Four Seasons Hotel Buenos Aires is a luxury hotel in the Retiro neighborhood of Buenos Aires, Argentina.

== History ==
The hotel opened in 1992 as the Park Hyatt Buenos Aires. Toronto-based Four Seasons Hotels and Resorts assumed management in 2001 and the hotel was renamed Four Seasons Hotel Buenos Aires on December 1, 2001. The hotel has 165 guest rooms, including 49 suites. They are contained in two wings. The 12-story main tower wing and the historic French Renaissance-style mansion wing, which houses the suites. The Mansion has a stone façade and was built in the Belle Époque style as a wedding gift from Mr. Felix Alzaga Unzué to his wife Elena Peña in 1920. It remains one of the most architecturally significant mansions in the Recoleta area.

The hotel underwent a $49 million renovation that was completed in 2013.

== Gallery ==
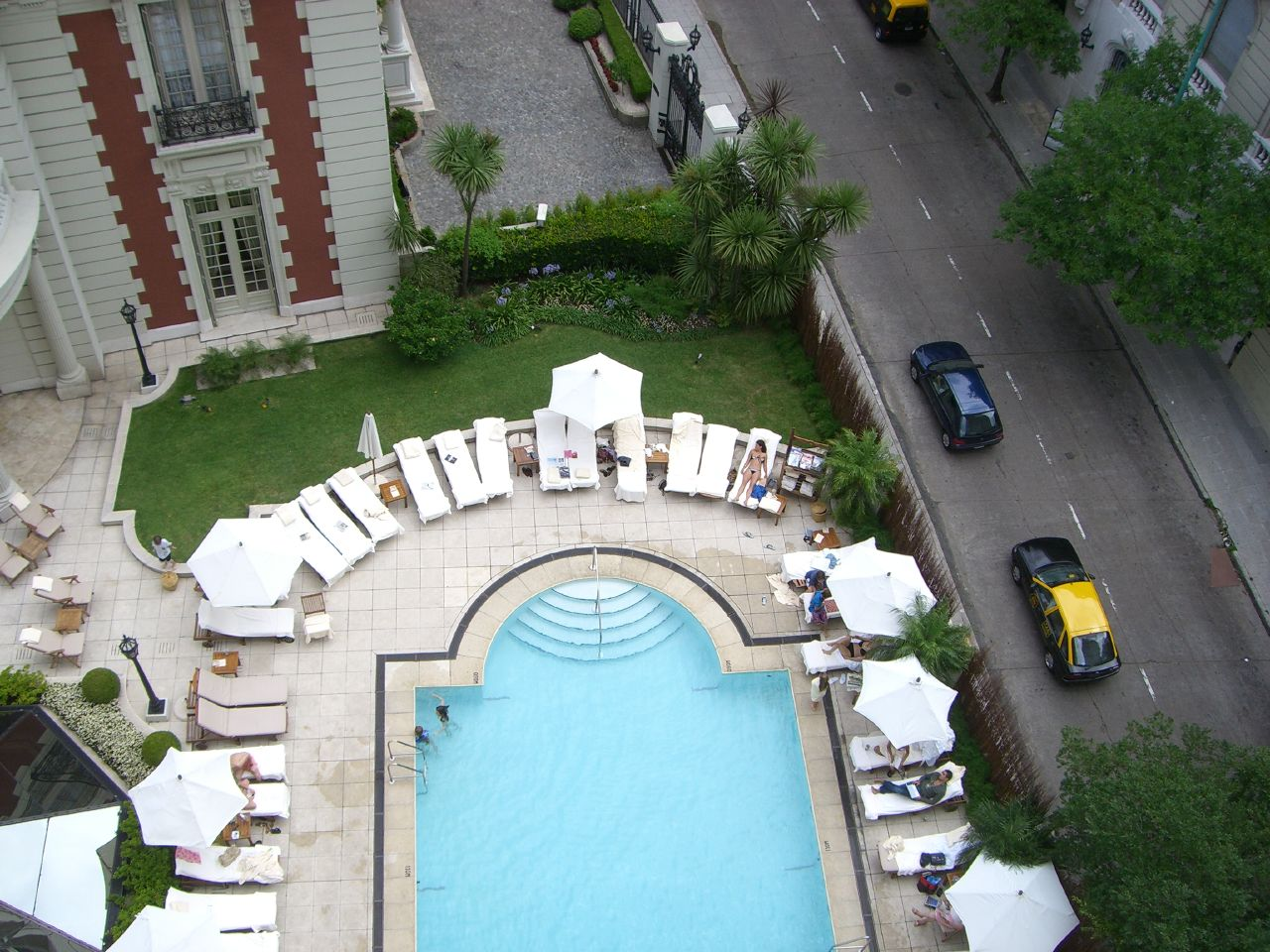
Pool view from the hotel tower
