= Torre Monumental =

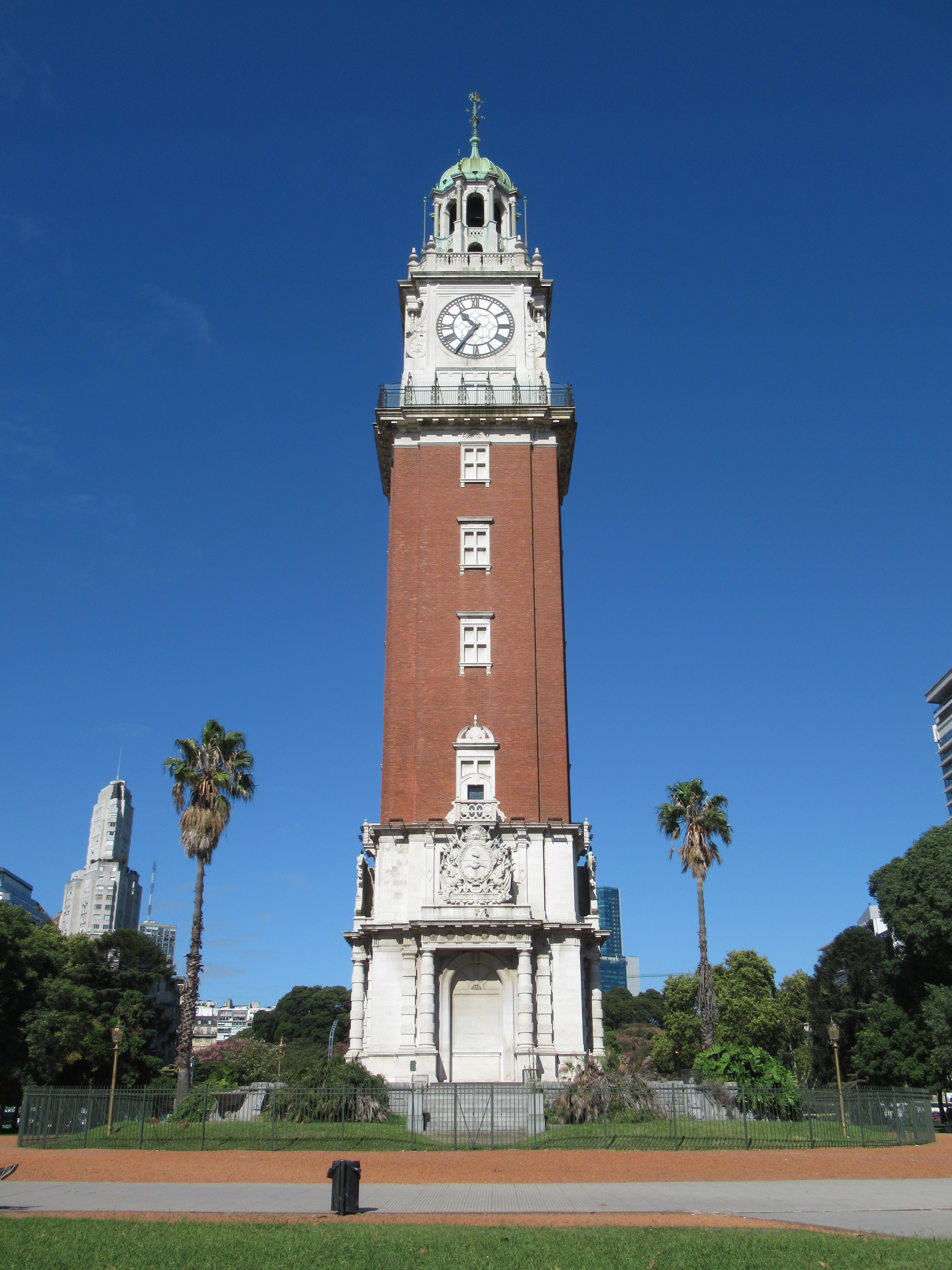
- Location in Buenos Aires
- Interactive map of Torre Monumental
- 34.5923°S 58.3737°W
- Location: Retiro, Buenos Aires, Argentina

History
- Built: May 24, 1916
- Built for: Monument

Site notes
- Height: 75.5 metres (248 ft)
- Architect: Sir Ambrose Macdonald Poynter
- Restored: 2006

Torre Monumental (Spanish for "Monumental Tower"), formerly known as Torre de los Ingleses ("Tower of the English"), is a clock tower located in the barrio (district) of Retiro in Buenos Aires, Argentina. It is situated in the Plaza Fuerza Aérea Argentina (formerly Plaza Británica) by Avenida San Martín and Avenida del Libertador. It was a gift from the local British community to the city in commemoration of the centennial of the May Revolution of 1810.

After the Falklands War in 1982, the tower's original name was dropped, though some still call it Torre de los Ingleses.

== History ==
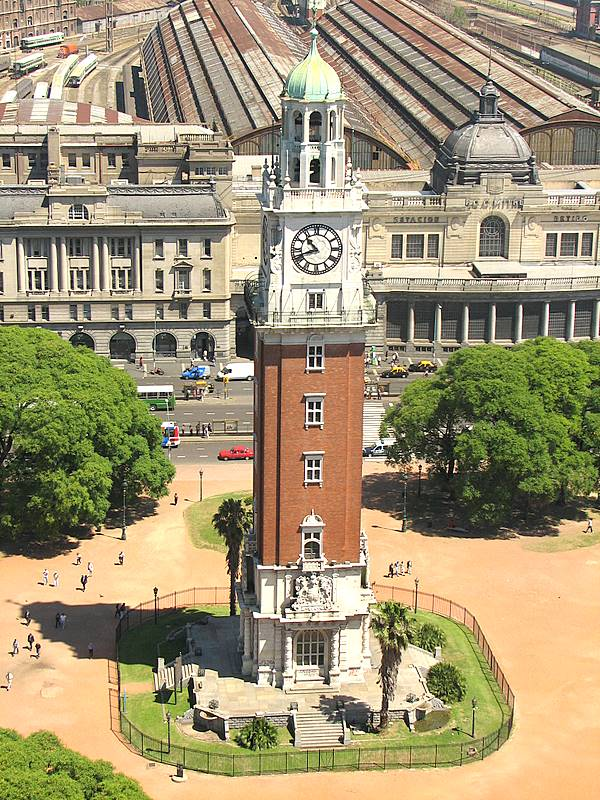
The Torre Monumental (formerly Torre de los Ingleses) in Plaza Fuerza Aérea Argentina (formerly Plaza Británica) and the Retiro railway station

On September 18, 1909 the Argentine National Congress passed Law N° 6368, consisting of an offer by the British residents of Buenos Aires to erect a monumental column to commemorate the centennial of the May Revolution. Although the centenary monument was initially considered to be a column, it ultimately took the form of the clock tower.

A 1910 exhibition of project proposals at the Salón del Bon Marché, today the Galerías Pacífico, resulted in the jury's award to English architect Sir Ambrose Macdonald Poynter (1867–1923), nephew of the founder of the Royal Institute of British Architects. The tower was built by Hopkins y Gardom, with materials shipped from England such as the white Portland stone and the bricks from Stonehouse, Gloucestershire (see below). The technical personnel responsible for the construction also came from England.

The sudden death of King Edward VII on May 6, 1910, prompted the United Kingdom to cancel its delegation to the Centenary celebrations, and the cornerstone was not laid until November 26. Other delays that followed were due to the late vacationing of the gas company that was installed in the square in 1912 and the outbreak of World War I in 1914. The inauguration of the building took place on May 24, 1916 and was attended by the President of Argentina Victorino de la Plaza and British dignitaries led by the minister plenipotentiary Reginald Tower.

In 1982, bitterness over the Falklands War and Argentina's subsequent defeat led to a sharp rise in anti-British sentiment. The tower was renamed Torre Monumental ("Monumental Tower") and the square where the tower is situated Plaza Británica ("British Square") was renamed Plaza Fuerza Aérea Argentina ("Argentine Air Force Square"). The war has triggered acts of vandalism against the tower, including a dynamite explosion detonated at its base in November 1984 (in which, however, the monument sustained only minor damage). During the government of Mayor Fernando de la Rúa (1996–1999), the tower underwent extensive restoration. Public access was restored and a glass lift to the 6th floor, utilising the original British machinery, was opened. The 6th floor features a small exhibition of elements of the original lift and a view over the district of Retiro, Retiro railway terminal and the Port of Buenos Aires; the clock pendulum is accessible on the 7th floor.

In 2006 the building was closed to the public for technical maintenance. The building is occasionally painted with anti-British graffiti.

== Description ==
The tower is built in Palladian style, the building is decorated with symbols of the British Empire and features the thistle of Scotland, the English rose, the Welsh dragon and the Irish shamrock.

The tower reaches a height of 75.5 m (247 ft 8 1/2 in) and has eight floors. The clock and the bells were designed in imitation of the ones at Westminster Abbey.

The tower is topped by an octagonal copper roofed cupola. Above the entrance there are the shields of Argentina and Great Britain and the inscription "al gran pueblo argentino, los residentes británicos, salud, 25 de mayo 1810-1910" ("To the health of the great Argentine people, from the British residents, May 25, 1810–1910").

== Gallery ==
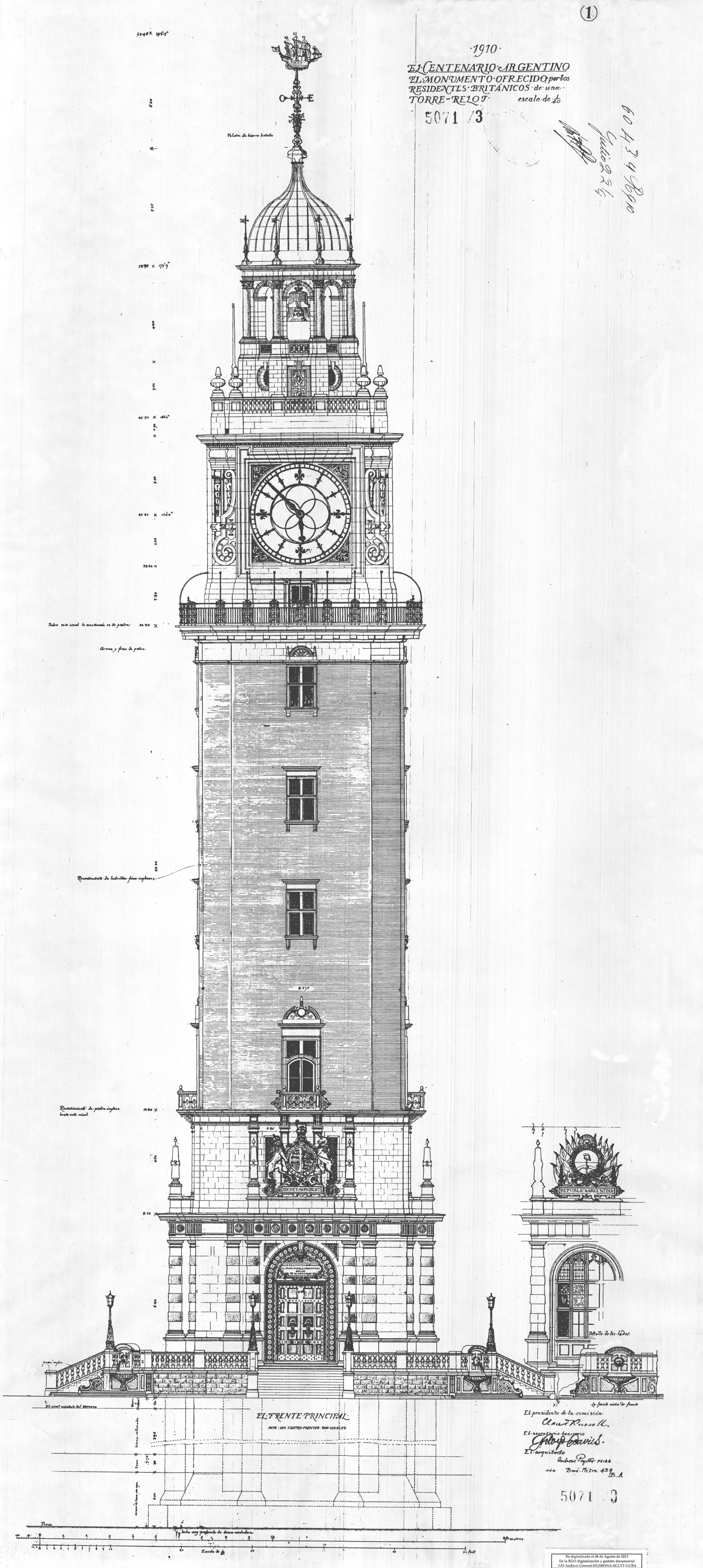

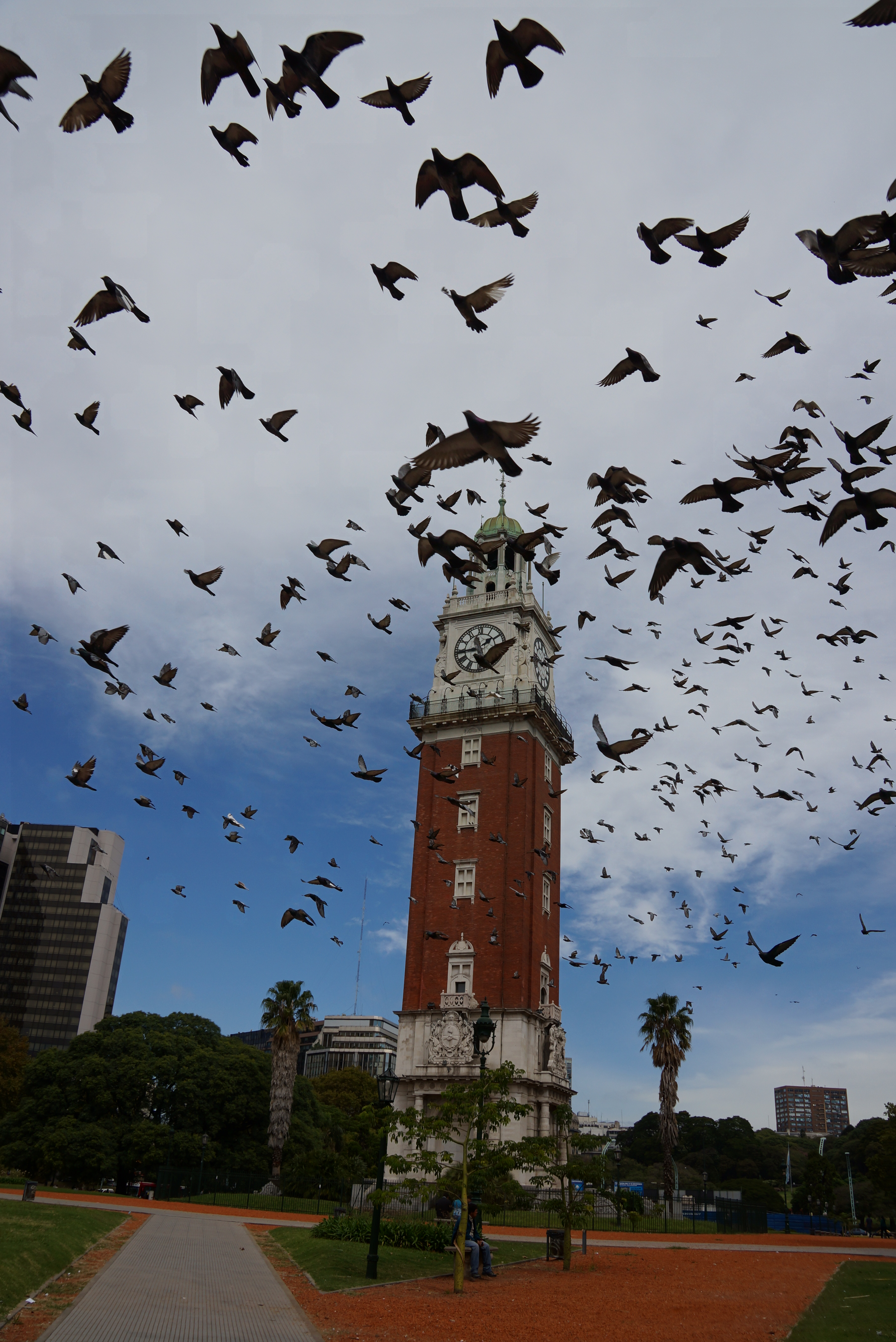

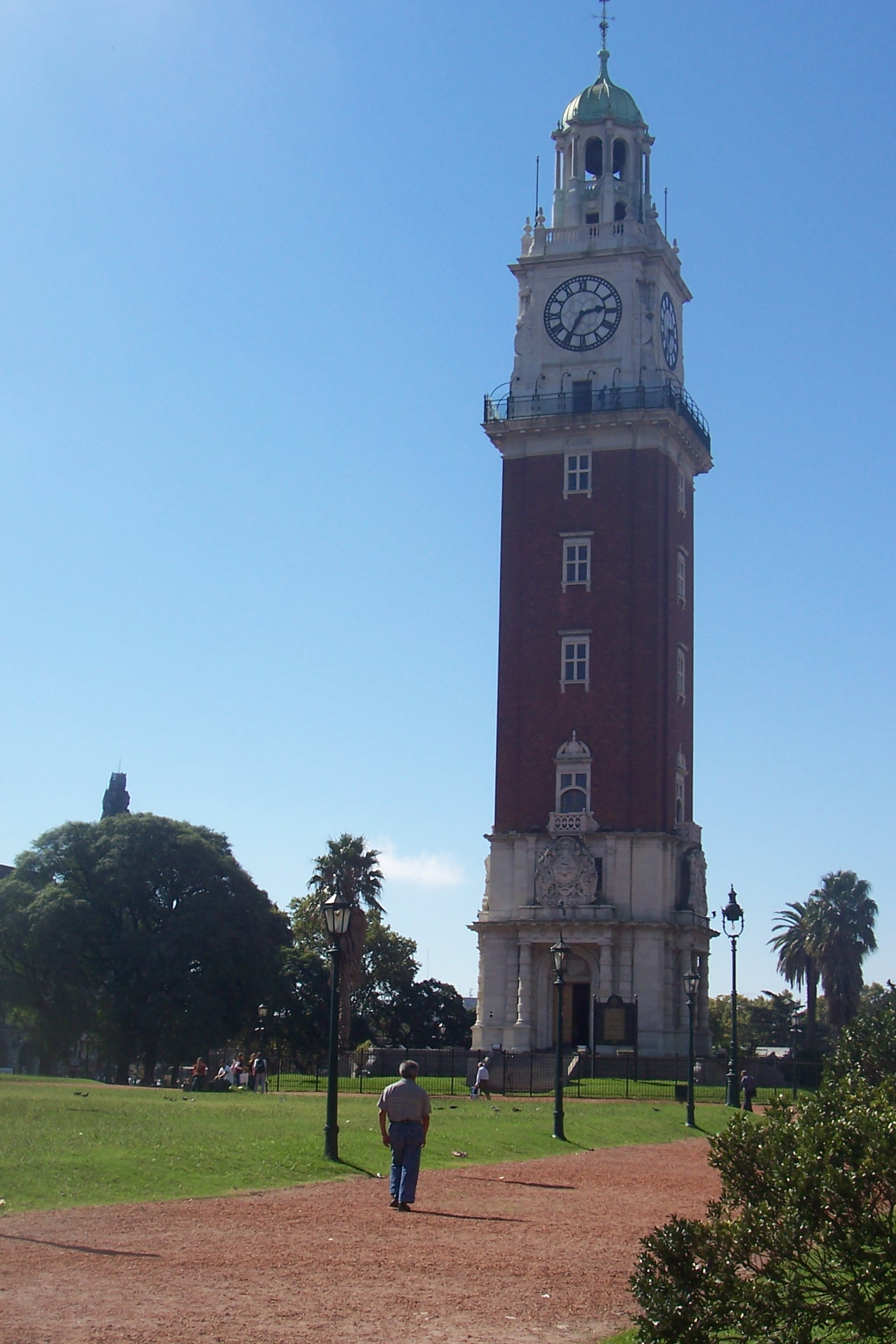

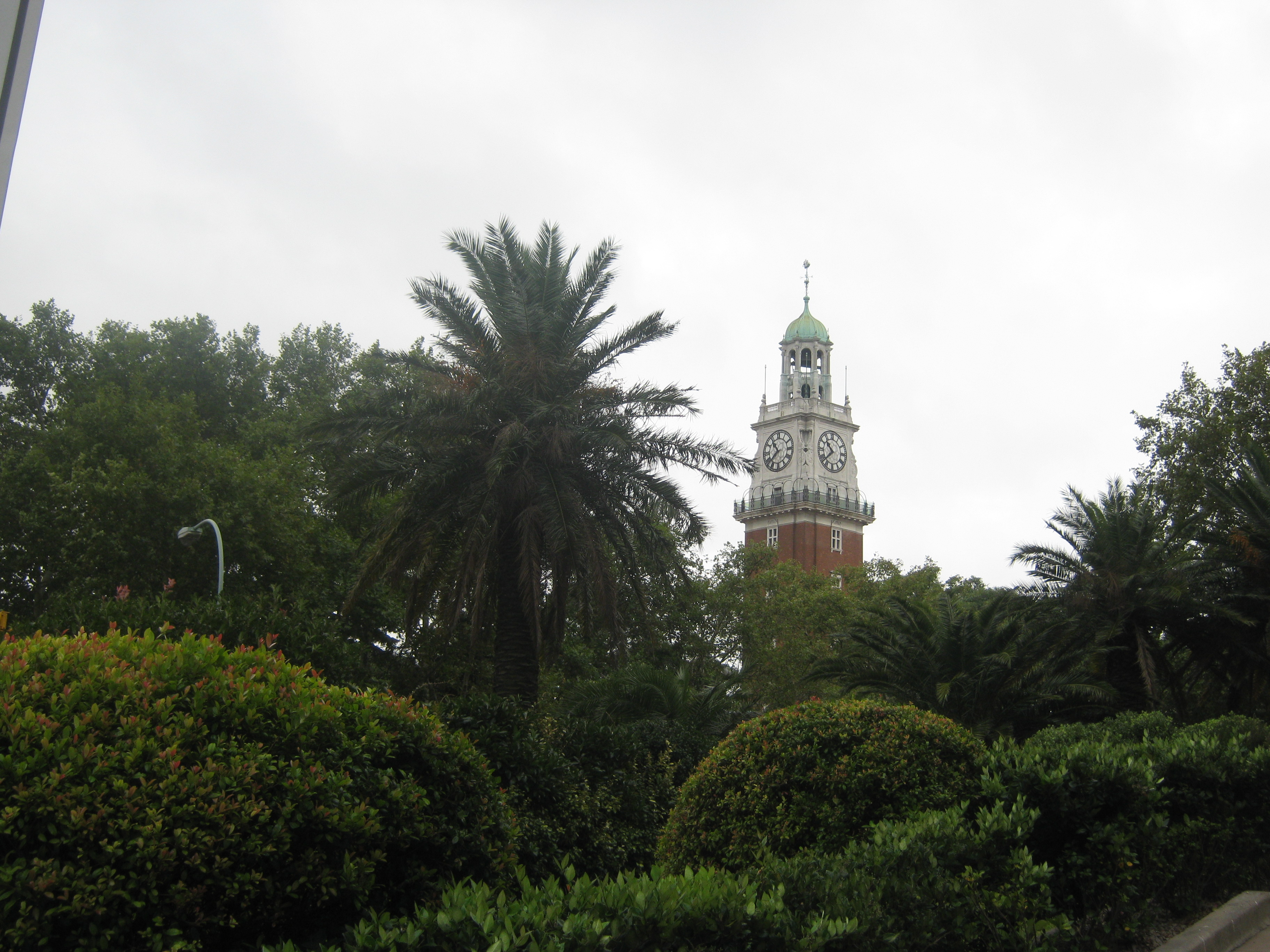

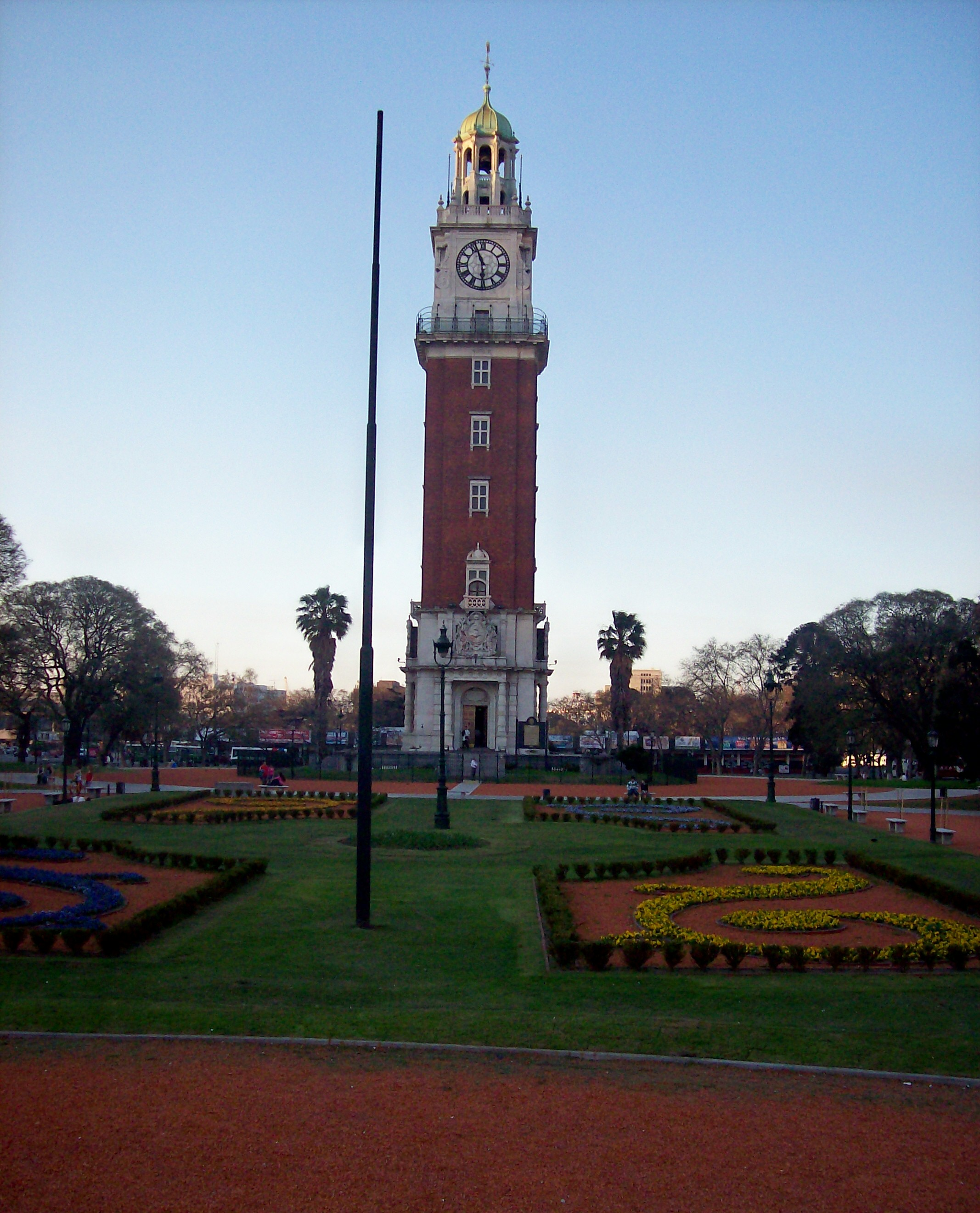

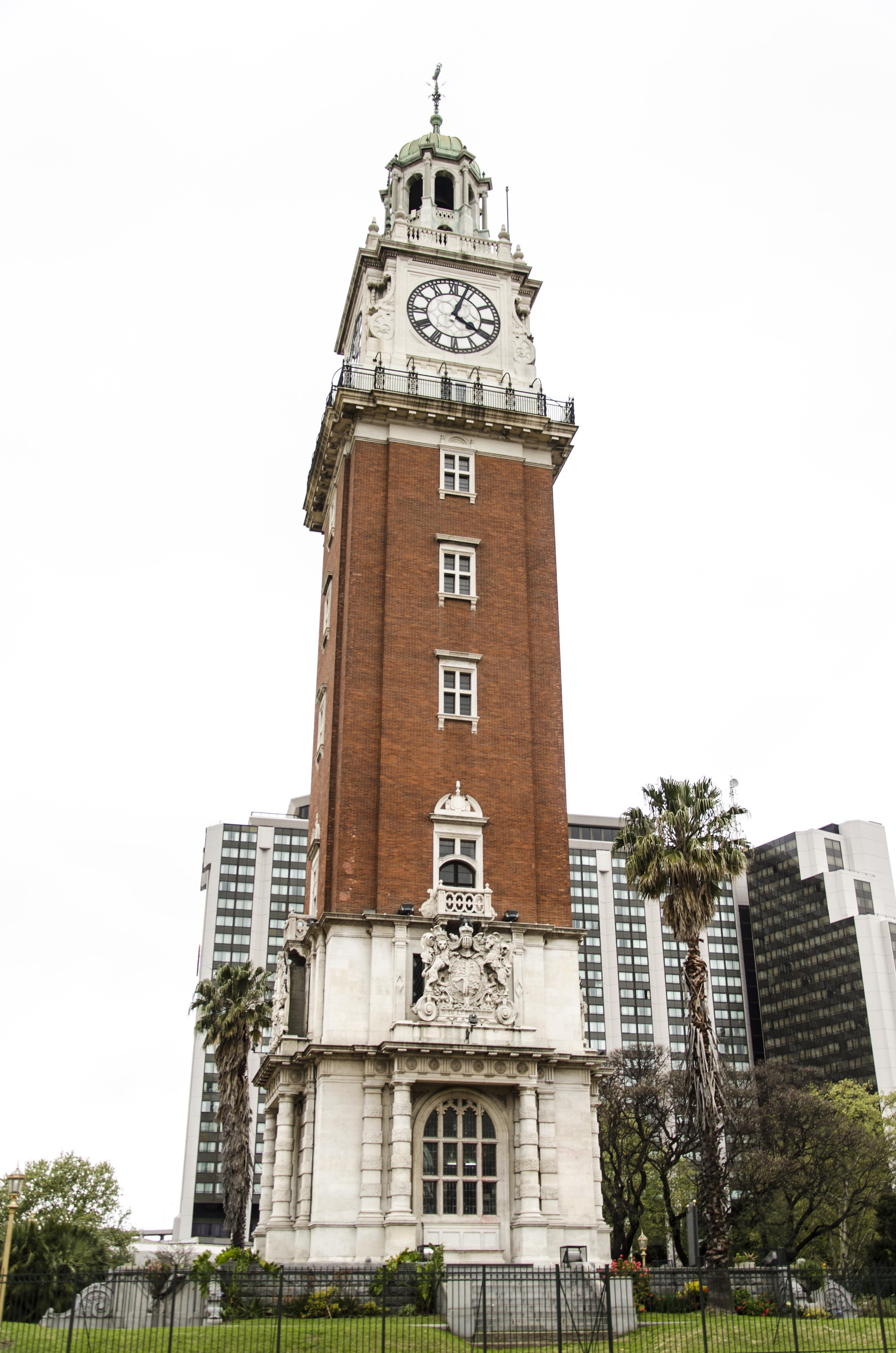

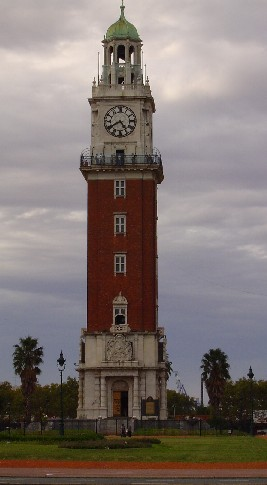

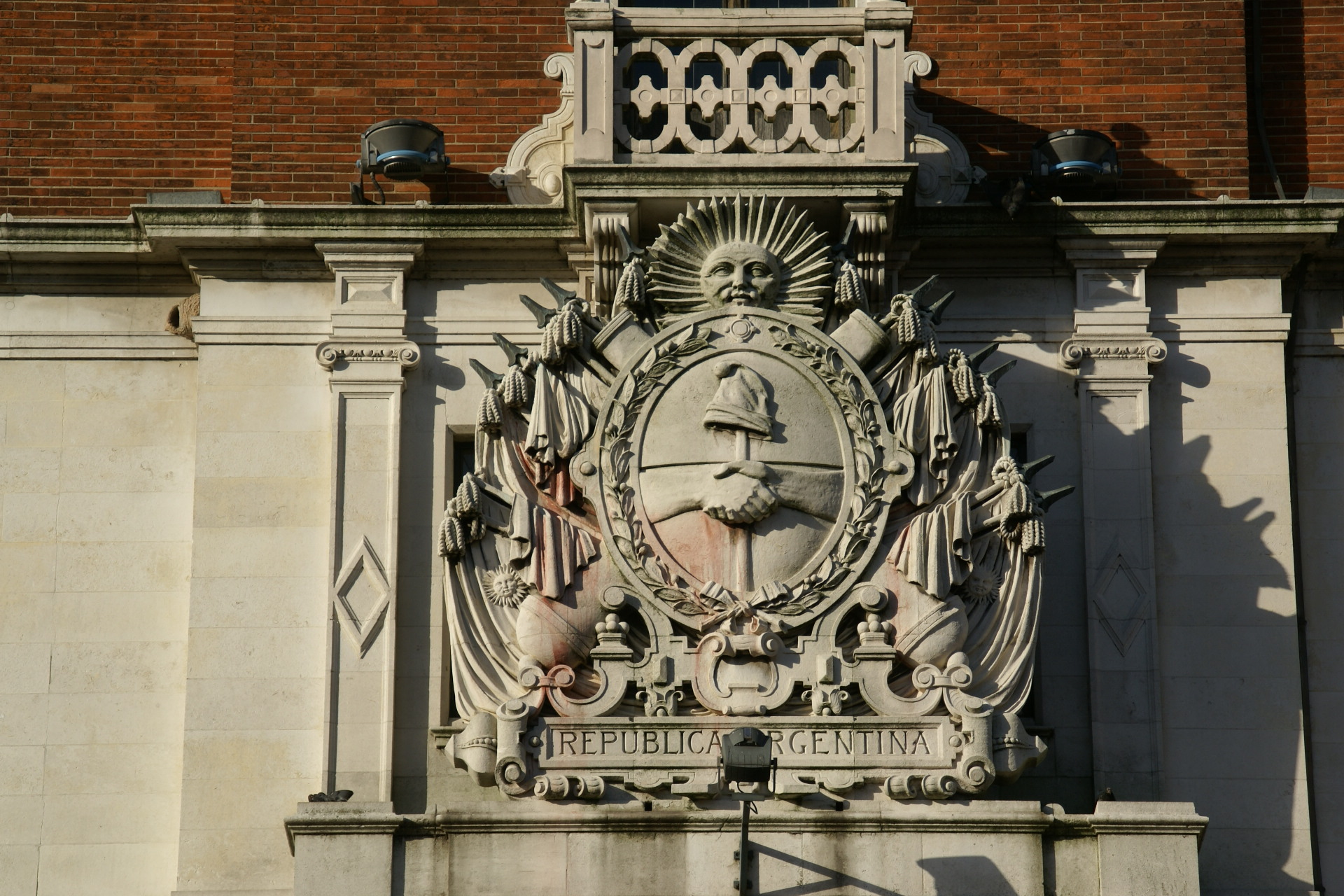

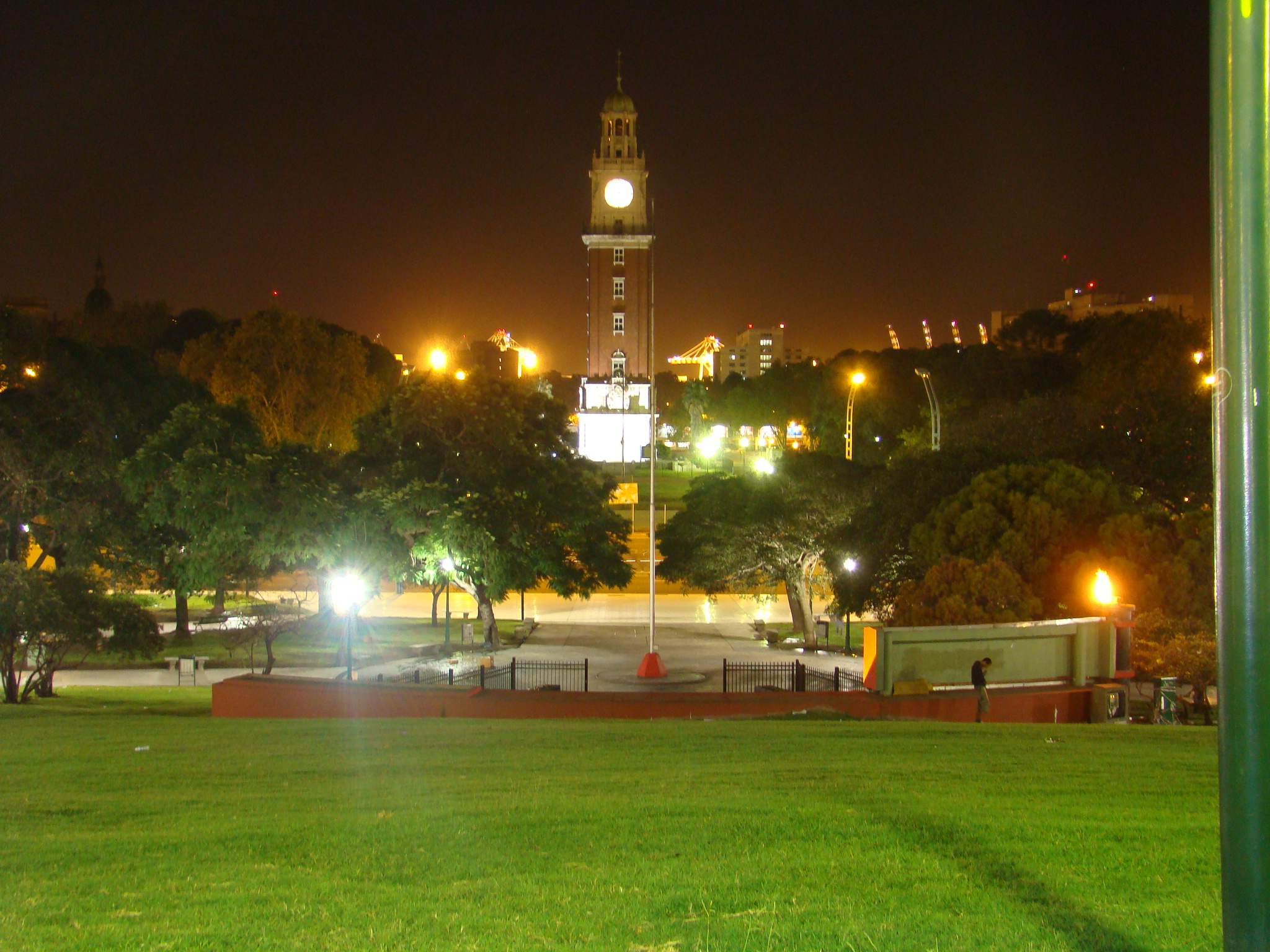

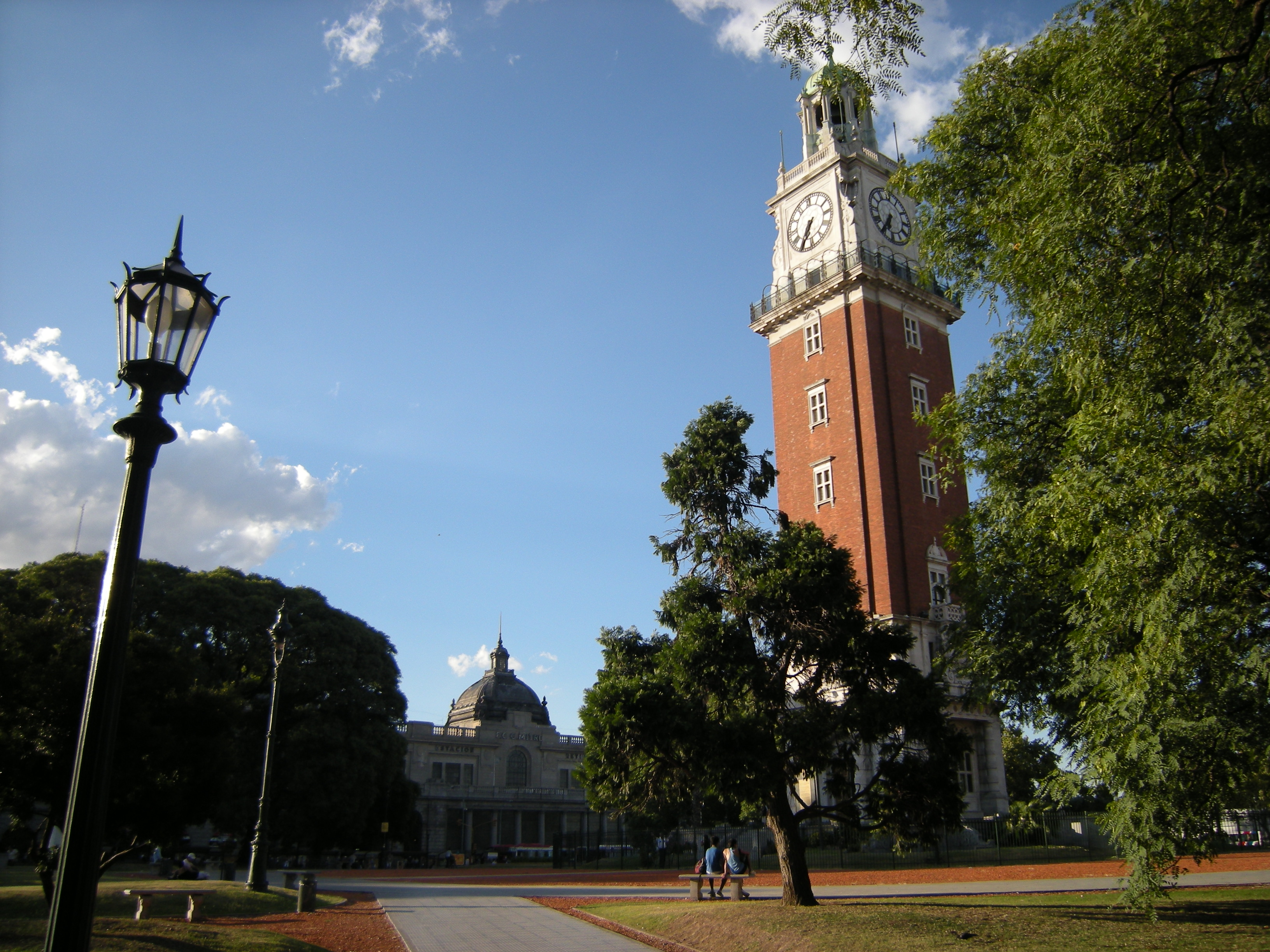
