= BAFWEEK =

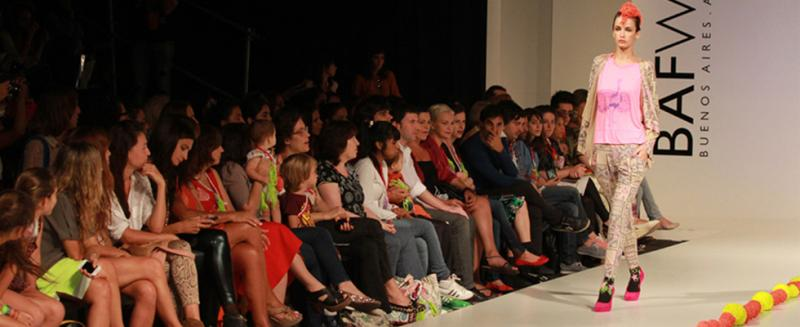
- Genre: clothing and fashion exhibitions
- Frequency: semi-annually
- Location: Buenos Aires
- Inaugurated: 2001
- Attendance: 40,000 people
- Organiser: La Nación, La Rural, APSA Centros Comerciales
- Website: bafweek.com.ar

BAFWEEK (abbreviation for Buenos Aires Fashion Week, also stylized as BAFWeek) is a biannual clothing trade show held mainly in La Rural fairgrounds, Buenos Aires. Argentina's most important fashion event, BAFWEEK showcases both leading brands and emerging designers. Past editions have featured runway shows by Argentine labels such as Prüne, with music direction and DJ sets by curator Soledad Rodríguez Zubieta (SRZ). In addition, the Semillero UBA BAFWEEK (UBA BAFWEEK) competition is held, where fashion design students from the University of Buenos Aires (UBA) are chosen by a panel of experts to present their collections at the event with financial support from Paseo Alcorta.

== See also ==
- Fashion week
- Fashion capital
- São Paulo Fashion Week
- Rio Fashion Week
- Milan Fashion Week
