= Catalinas Norte =

Business complex in Buenos Aires, Argentina

Coordinates: 34°35′43″S 58°22′17″W

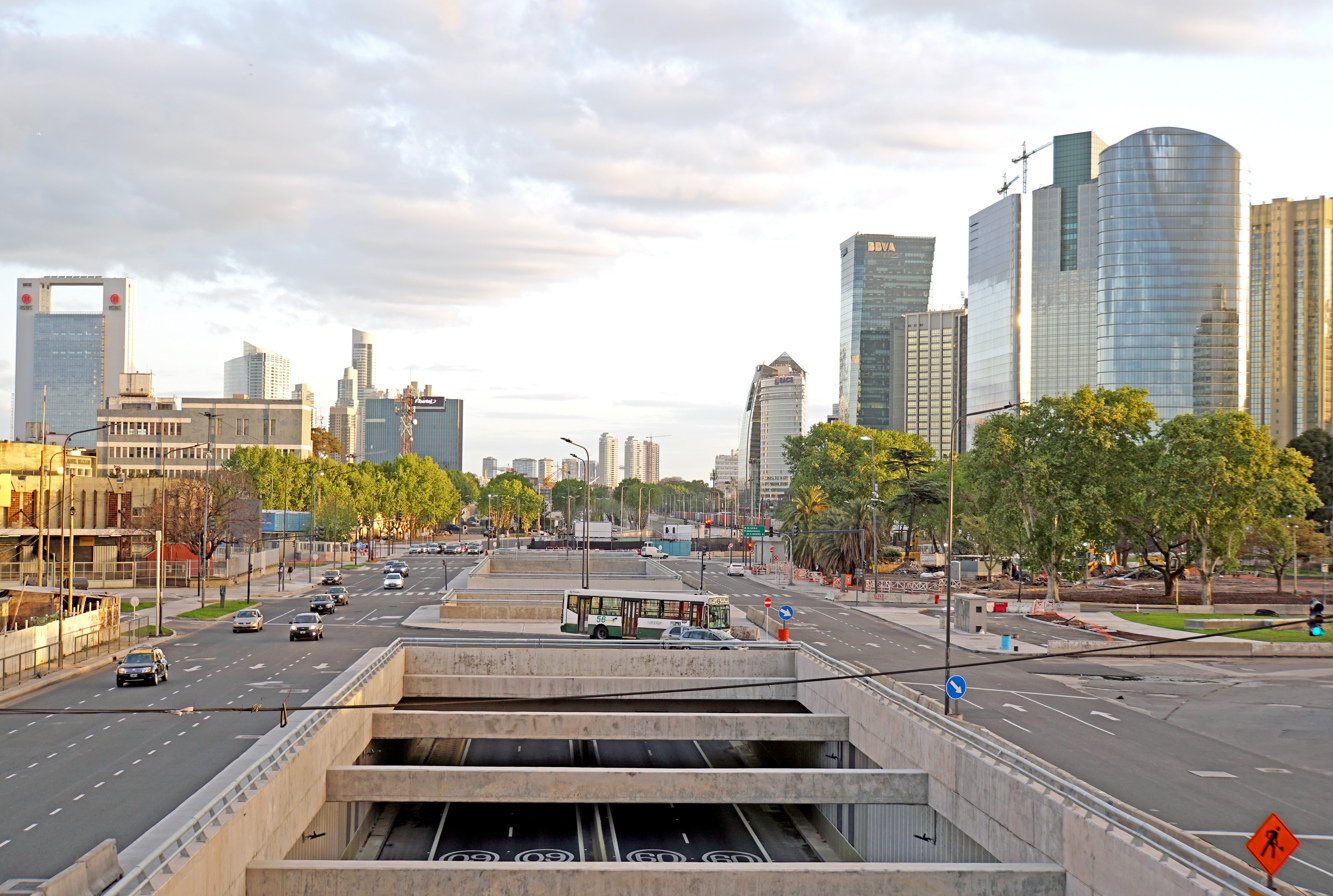
Catalinas Norte office park (right) along the Antártida Argentina Avenue

Catalinas Norte is a business complex composed of nineteen commercial office buildings, in two sections, occupied by Argentine and multinational companies, diplomatic offices, and a hotel. It is located in the Retiro and San Nicolás neighborhoods of Buenos Aires, Argentina.

== History ==
=== The Catalinas Warehouses and Pier Company Ltd. ===
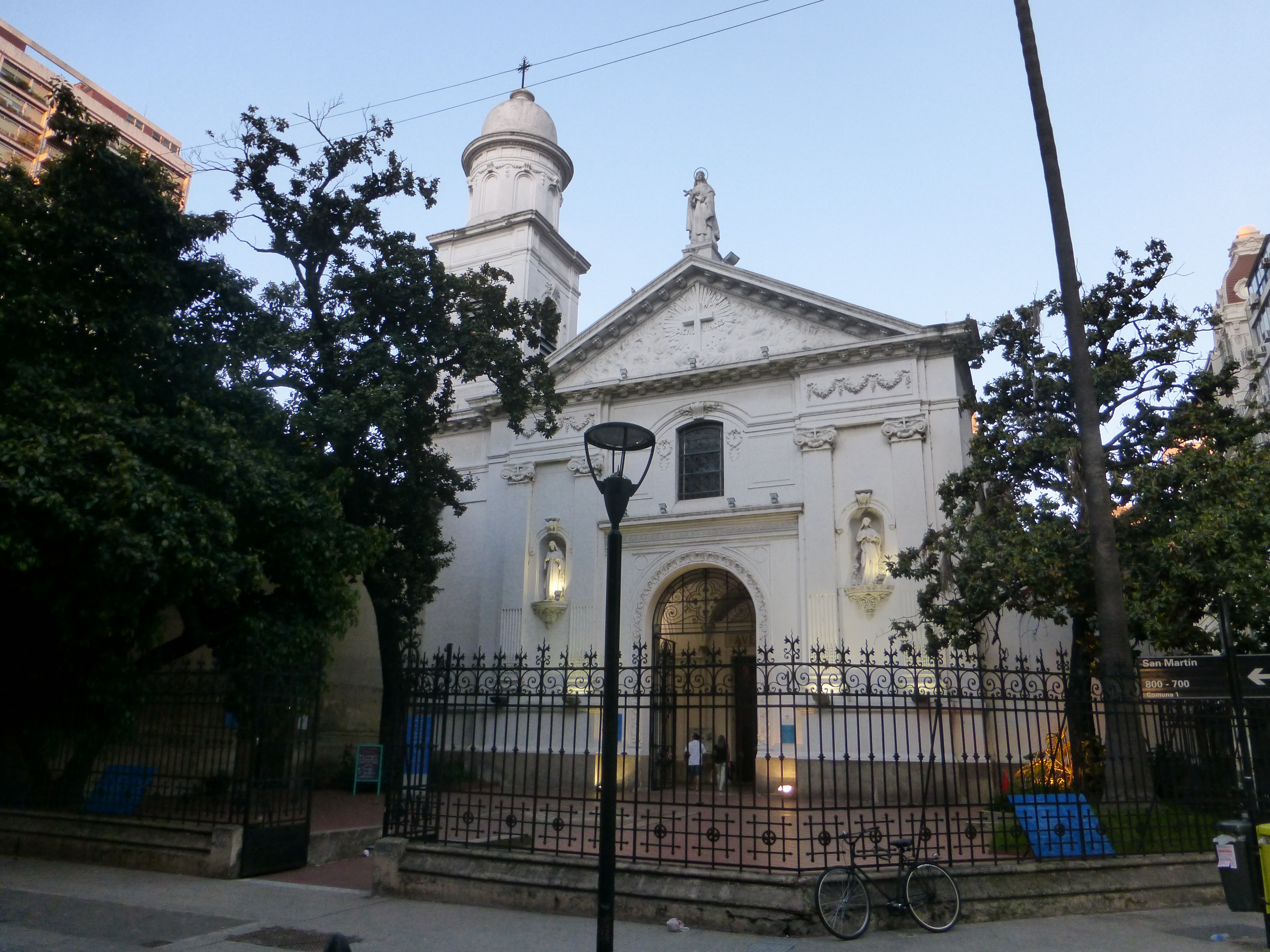
The Parish of Santa Catalina de Sienna, the development's namesake

Francisco Seeber, a German Argentine businessman and legislator, created The Catalinas Warehouses and Pier Company, Ltd. in 1872 for the purpose of building a pier (near Paraguay Street), a wharf, and an office building. The acquired lands were east of the Paseo de Julio (now Leandro Alem Avenue).

The area was known as the "Catalinas Incline", and was so named for the Church of Santa Catalina of Sienna (still standing on the corner of Viamonte and San Martín streets). This church also served as the namesake for Seeber's new firm. With the purchase of more land in the quarter of La Boca, the Retiro lot was named Catalinas Norte (North Catalinas), and the La Boca lot, Catalinas Sur.

The firm obtained a municipal contract for the construction of the Catalina Docks. Needing a large and steady supply of soil to level and grade the hitherto flood-prone site for the wharf, Seeber bought land in the then-desolate northwest end of the city with the intent of hauling soil to Catalinas for land reclamation. Enlisting workers mostly from Entre Ríos Province, these latter established a neighborhood (Villa Urquiza) there in 1887.

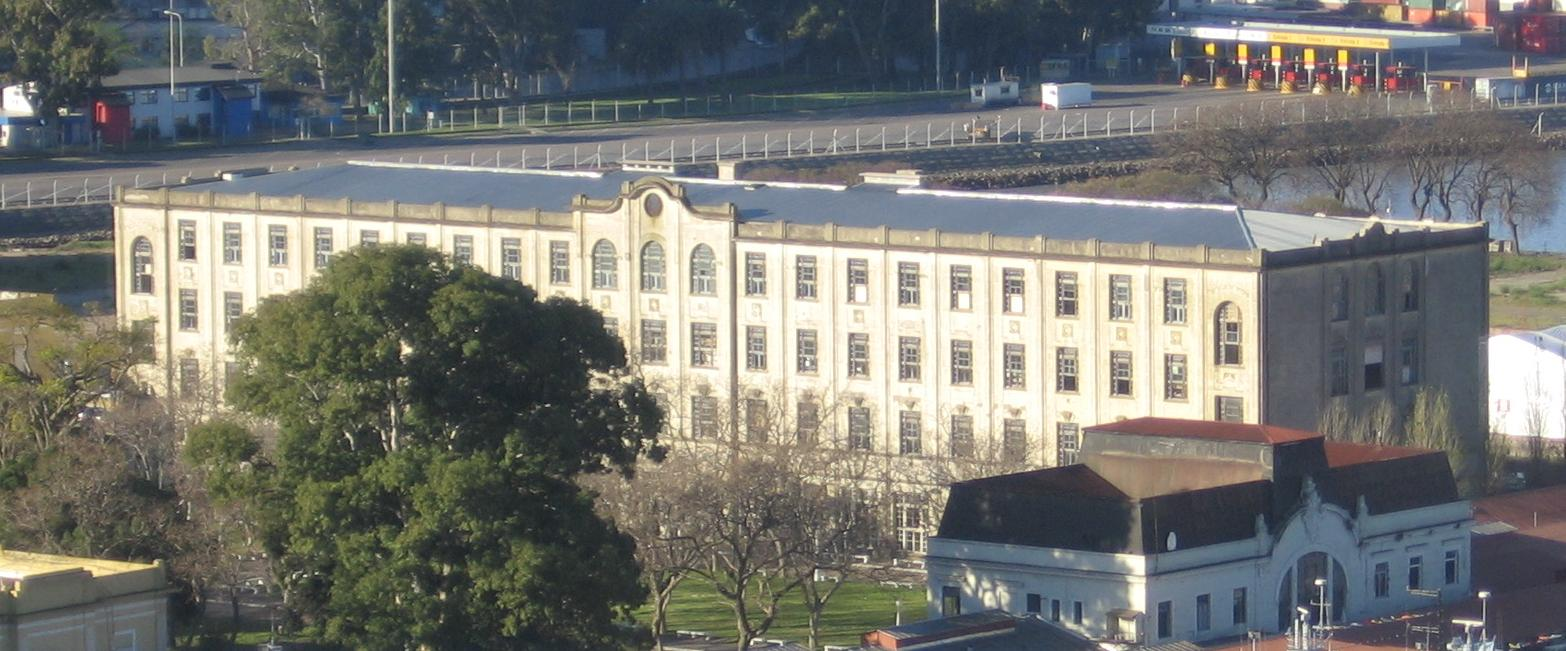
The Immigrants' Hotel, built on the Catalinas wharf, and opened in 1911

These docks became the northern and southern points of entry into Puerto Madero upon its inaugural in 1897. Catalinas Norte was later chosen as the site for the Hotel de Inmigrantes, a facility built to temporarily house the over 100,000 annual immigrant arrivals, and completed in 1911. Following the construction of the modern Port of Buenos Aires from 1911 to 1925, both Catalinas docks fell into disuse, and October 31, 1945, the Catalinas Warehouses properties were sold to Yatahí, S.A. A lot facing Córdoba Avenue was, in turn, resold in 1949 to a State enterprise created during the administration of Juan Perón: Atlas, S.A. This entity built the Alas Building, and an adjacent lot was used to build the Peronist ALEA publishing house (redeveloped as Microsoft's South American headquarters in 2000).

The bulk of the land, totaling 39,110 m^{2} (429,000 ft^{2}), north of these buildings continued vacant for decades. A further 24,200 m^{2} (260,000 ft^{3}) were owned by Otto Bemberg and Company, which opened the Retiro Park (an amusement park) there in 1939; the rest was later mostly used as parking lots.

=== Early plans ===
The underutilized state of an area so close to the financial and administrative center of the city prompted the Municipal Department of Planning in 1956 to draft an urban renewal plan for the district. This envisaged the construction of a highway that would extend from Tigre to La Plata, as well as rezoning Catalinas to allow for the construction of office buildings of up to 70 floors. This district, per these plans, would ultimately be known as the "Catalinas Gateway" to Buenos Aires.

The City Office of Regulatory Planning (OPRBA) further specified, in its revised master plan of 1958, that construction of skyscrapers in downtown Buenos Aires would be prohibited, and limited these to the Catalinas district. Mayor Hernán Giralt presented a project to the City Council for the development of "an area of hotels, an office and retail center, a location for shipping companies and air travel, a recreation center and a large area for parking," and on February 3, 1960, the Argentine National Congress authorized the City to purchase land north of Catalinas for the purpose. The Catalinas Norte Commission was established in 1961, but a subsequent political and economic crisis caused the project to stall and ultimately be discarded.

=== The final draft ===
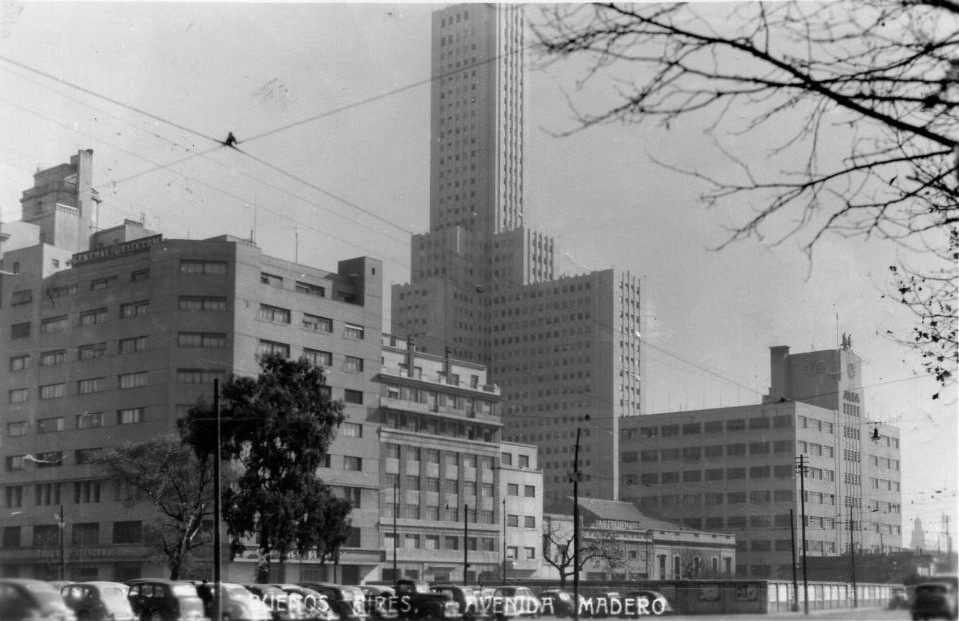
1955: Construction of the Alas Tower and the demolition of warehouses initiated development in the Catalinas Norte area

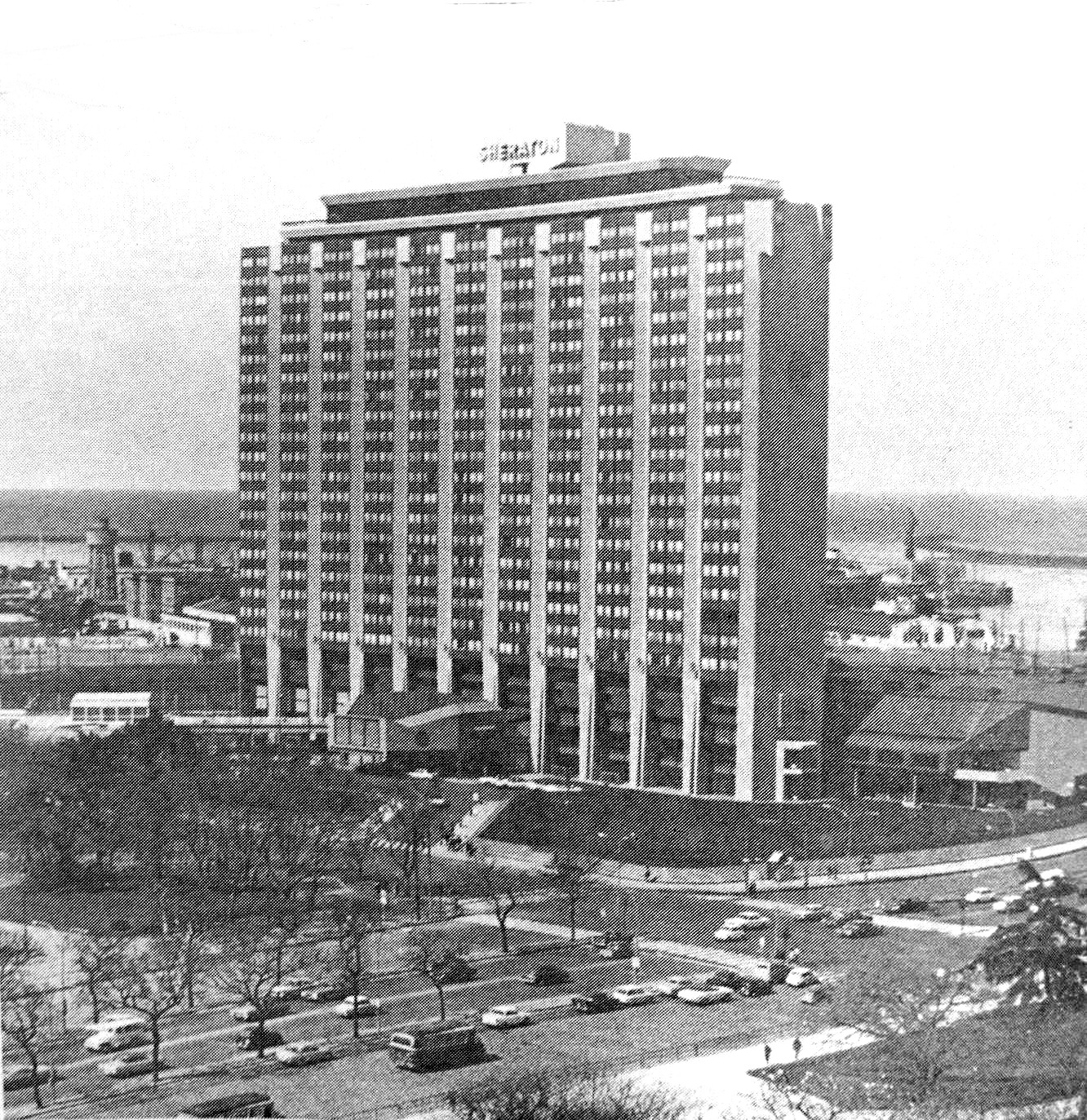
The Sheraton Hotel was the first high rise in Catalinas Norte proper

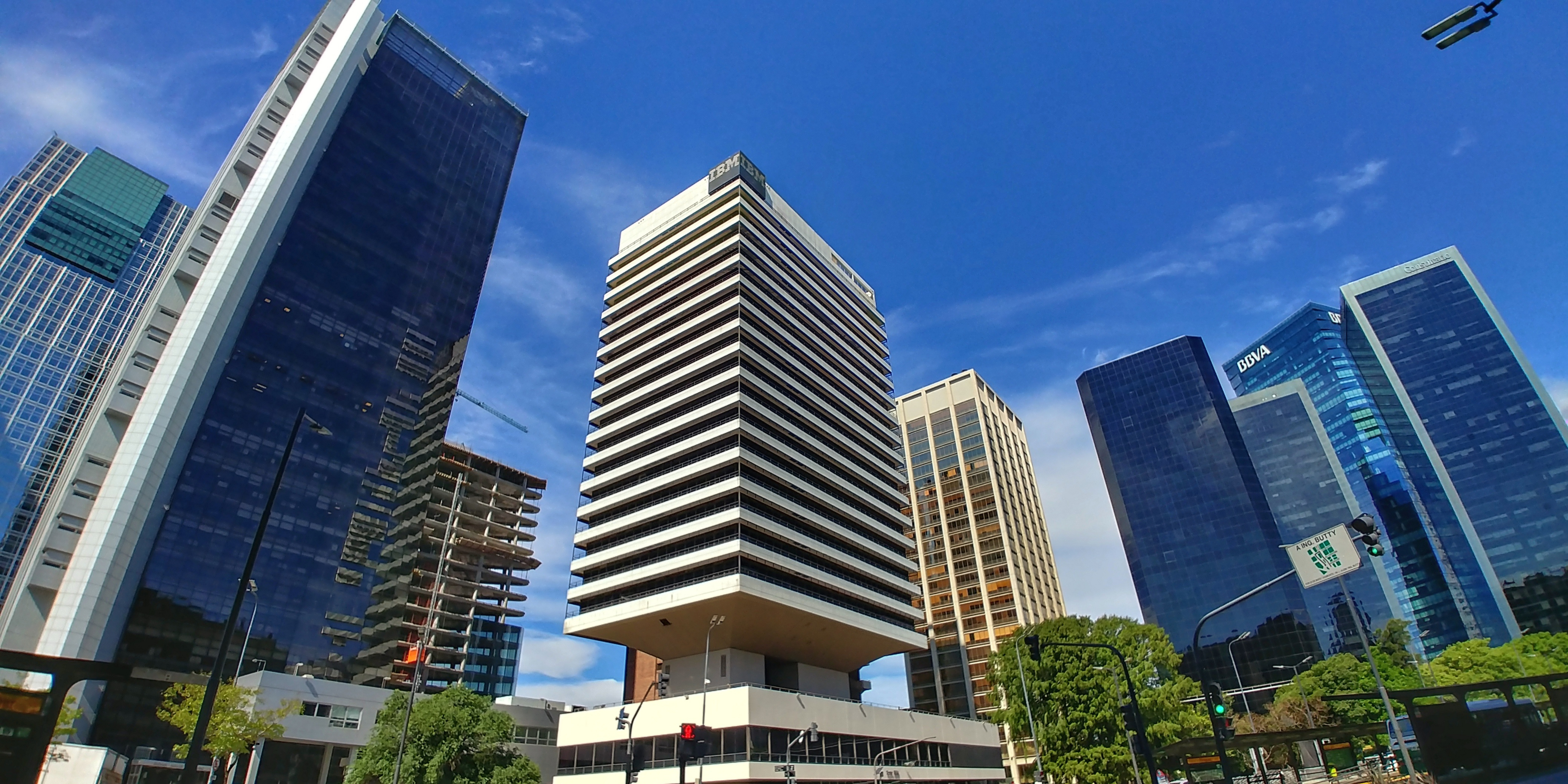
IBM Tower in the complex

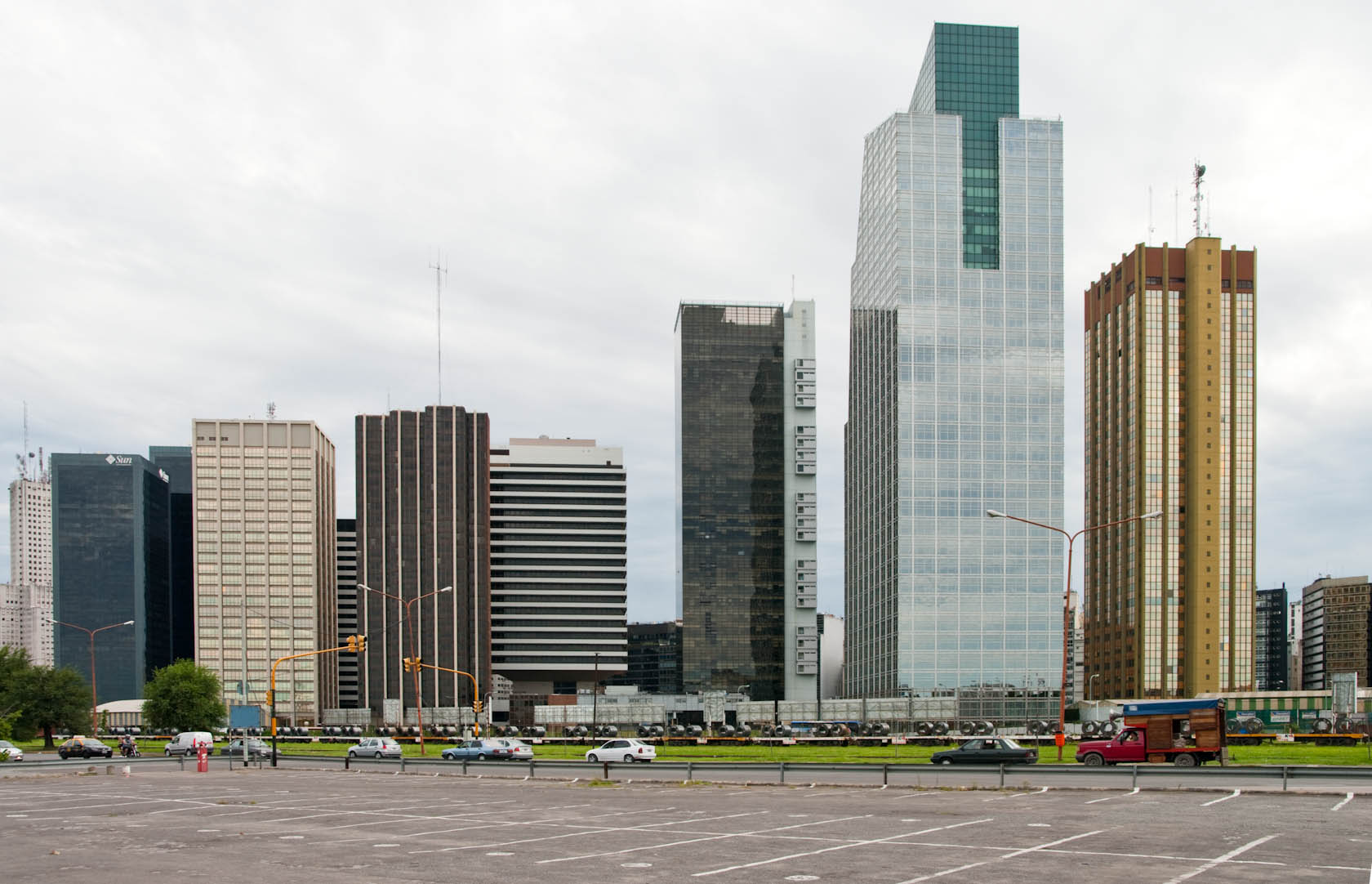
Northern section

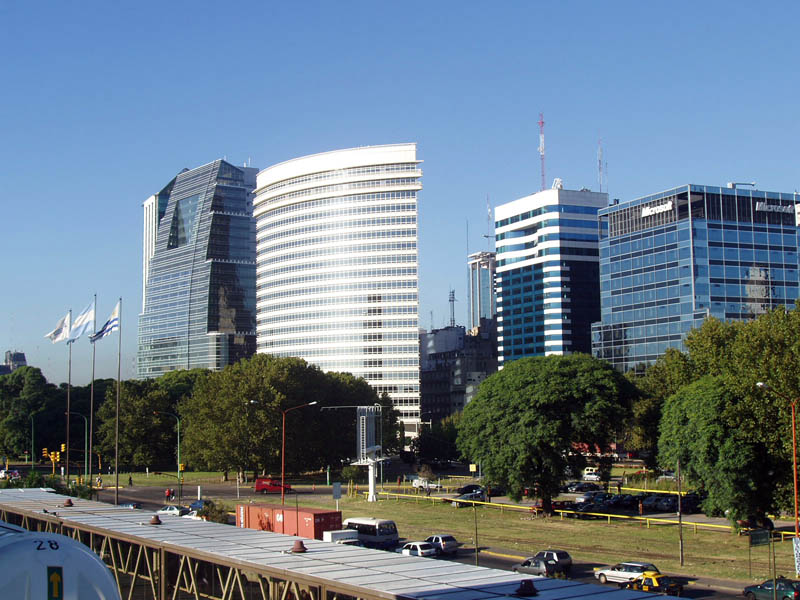
Southern section

The coup d'état that toppled President Arturo Illia in 1966 led to the dissolution of OPRBA. Mayor Eugenio Schettini instructed the Municipal Department of Architecture and Urbanism (MCBA) to design a new, simpler plan that would limit permits for office high rises. A municipal ordinance in 1967 parceled the land in accordance with the 1958 master plan, and lots were sold to Aerolíneas Argentinas, Conurban S.A, IBM, Impresit Sideco, Kokourek S.A, SEGBA (the state-owned city electric utility), Sheraton, and the Argentine Industrial Union (UIA). Retiro Park was bulldozed, and the Buenos Aires Japanese Gardens therein were relocated to their present, Palermo Woods location. The MCBA, in turn, retained four areas, opened three parking lots, and built two promenades: Carlos Della Paolera and Ingeniero Butty.

=== Development ===
Ground was broken on the first buildings in the complex, the Kokourek Group's Conurban Tower (in April 1969), and the Sheraton Buenos Aires Hotel & Convention Center, on June 26. Work began on the Carlos Pellegrini Tower for the UIA in 1970, and on the Catalinas Norte Tower (for Impresit Sideco) in 1972. The Conurban Tower was inaugurated in 1973, Carlos Pellegrini in 1974, and Catalinas Norte, in 1975. Work then began on the Madero Tower (so named for its Eduardo Madero Avenue address) in 1976, and in 1979, the IBM Tower. These high rises, while not the first in Buenos Aires to incorporate elements of the International Style (such as curtain walls), became the first to do so as a group. SEPRA Arquitectos, a prominent Argentine architectural firm, designed the Sheraton Hotel and the Catalinas Norte Tower.

The implosion of the dictatorship's economic policies in 1981 led to a suspension in new developments for the area, however, as well as a sharp decline in new construction as a whole. A subsequent economic recovery that followed Economy Minister Domingo Cavallo's 1991 Convertibility Plan prompted renewed interest among developers, and from 1995 to 1998, the Consultatio Group developed the Alem and Catalinas Plaza twin towers, and IRSA, Laminar Plaza (all designed by SEPRA). The final addition to the complex during the 1990s was the Bank Boston Tower. The Postmodern high rise, designed by César Pelli, was completed in 2001 and at 137 meters (450 ft), would become the tallest in the district.

=== Expansion to the south ===
The flurry of new construction also led to the redevelopment of the southern end of MCBA's redevelopment district (located in the San Nicolás ward). The Bouchard Tower and Loma Negra's Fortabat Tower, both designed by SEPRA, were built between 1991 and 1995. The República Building, designed by Pelli for the now defunct Banco República, was completed in 1996 (with Telefónica de Argentina as its chief tenant). The Microsoft Building (by Mario Roberto Álvarez), opened in 2001, and Bouchard Plaza, designed by Hellmuth, Obata and Kassabaum for the La Nación news and publishing group, opened in 2004.

=== Sale of last remaining lots ===
The complex, which by 2004 included 15 buildings totalling over 540,000 m^{2} (5.8 million ft^{2}), was in the news during 2009 and 2010, when Mayor Mauricio Macri obtained the City Legislature's approval to sell the remaining three undeveloped lots. The combined land is zoned to house up to 120,000 m² (1.3 million ft²) of new office space, and the city sanctioned the future construction of high rises of up to 50 stories, and 150 m (492 ft) in height (slightly more than the tallest building currently in Catalinas). The third and last lot was sold on November 18, 2010, to Banco Macro. The other lots had been sold to IRSA and Consultatio earlier in the year, and the combined sales netted 386 million Argentine pesos (us$99 million), or us$6,866 per m² (us$639 per ft²).

Projects approved for these lots during 2011 include the Macro Tower, a 130 metres (430 ft) headquarters designed by César Pelli; the 155 metres (509 ft) Consultatio Tower by Beccar Varela & Associates; and the 29-story IRSA headquarters, designed by Miguel Baudizzone and Jorge Lestard. BBVA Banco Francés, the fifth largest bank in Argentina, announced in 2013 that it would relocate its headquarters to the Consultatio Tower upon the building's completion. One last potential zone for future development, a 5,694 m^{2} (613,000 ft^{2}) property alongside the Alas Building, remains in use as a parking lot.

== Overview ==
Existing and approved commercial real estate in Catalinas Plaza

Building	Completed	floors	Height in m	(ft)	Area in m^{2}	(ft^{2})
Alas Building	1957	41	141	(463)	99,000	1,065,000
Sheraton Buenos Aires	1972	23	91	(299)	62,000	667,000
Torre Conurban	1973	25	95	(312)	26,217	282,000
Torre Carlos Pellegrini	1974	31	121	(397)	35,000	377,000
Torre Catalinas Norte	1975	29	109	(358)	34,000	366,000
Torre Madero	1980	28	96	(315)	33,767	363,000
IBM Tower	1983	19	85	(279)	31,000	334,000
Torre Bouchard	1994	30	110	(361)	36,025	388,000
Torre Fortabat	1995	23	85	(279)	17,000	183,000
Edificio República	1996	22	91	(299)	35,369	381,000
Torre Alem Plaza	1998	32	128	(420)	38,000	409,000
Torre Catalinas Plaza	1998	29	115	(377)	34,000	366,000
Edificio Laminar Plaza	1999	20	72.5	(238)	35,720	384,000
Edificio Microsoft	2001	12	57	(187)	15,800	170,000
Torre BankBoston	2001	33	137	(450)	45,000	484,000
Bouchard Plaza	2004	26	100	(328)	65,000	700,000
Torre Consultatio/BBVA	2015	33	155	(508)	76,000	817,000
Torre Macro	2016	28	130	(426)	35,500	382,000
Torre IRSA	2017	29	99	(325)	55,500	597,000
