= Thomas Gowland =

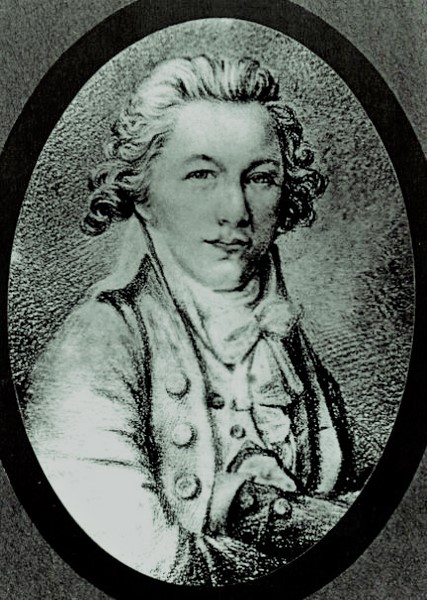
- portrait of Thomas Gowland Chamberlayne

Personal details
- Born: 8 September 1768 London, Kingdom of Great Britain
- Died: 2 November 1833 (aged 65) Buenos Aires, Argentina
- Cause of death: accident
- Resting place: La Recoleta Cemetery
- Spouse: Sarah Phillips
- Children: Daniel Santiago Gowland; Tomás Diego Gowland; Juan Gowland; María Elena Gowland
- Occupation: merchant importer exporter

Thomas Gowland (1768–1833) was a British trader, who dedicated himself to the import and export of manufactured products in Buenos Aires. He was the patriarch of the Gowland family in the Rio de la Plata, established in the Buenos Aires neighborhood of San Nicolás at the beginning of the 19th century.

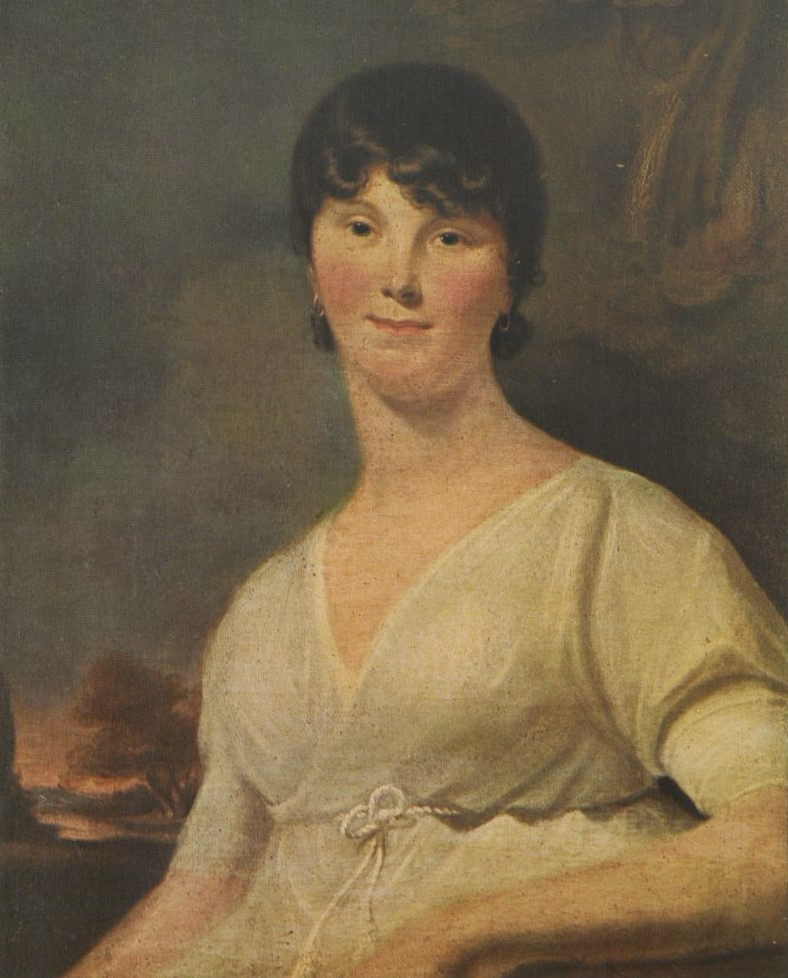
His wife Sarah Phillips Mallet

== Life ==
He was born in London, England, the son of Thomas Gowland and Emma Elizabeth Chamberlayne, a family originally from Durham. His grandparents were Edmund Chamberlayne and Elizabeth Atkyns, members of the English aristocracy. He was one of the most distinguished merchants of Buenos Aires and Montevideo, having an active part in the main mercantile activities of the British firms of the Río de la Plata. He maintained an excellent relationship with Buenos Aires society at the time, and also with Juan Manuel de Rosas, with whom he used to meet.

Thomas Gowland had emigrated to Argentina in 1812, accompanied by his wife Sarah Phillips and sons Daniel, Thomas and John. He died on 2 November 1833, when a gun was accidentally fired. He was originally buried in the Protestant Cemetery of Victoria, and transferred to the closing of this to the Gowland family pantheon in The Recoleta Cemetery.
