= Bouchard Plaza =

Office building in Buenos Aires, Argentina

Coordinates: 34°36′03″S 58°22′08″W

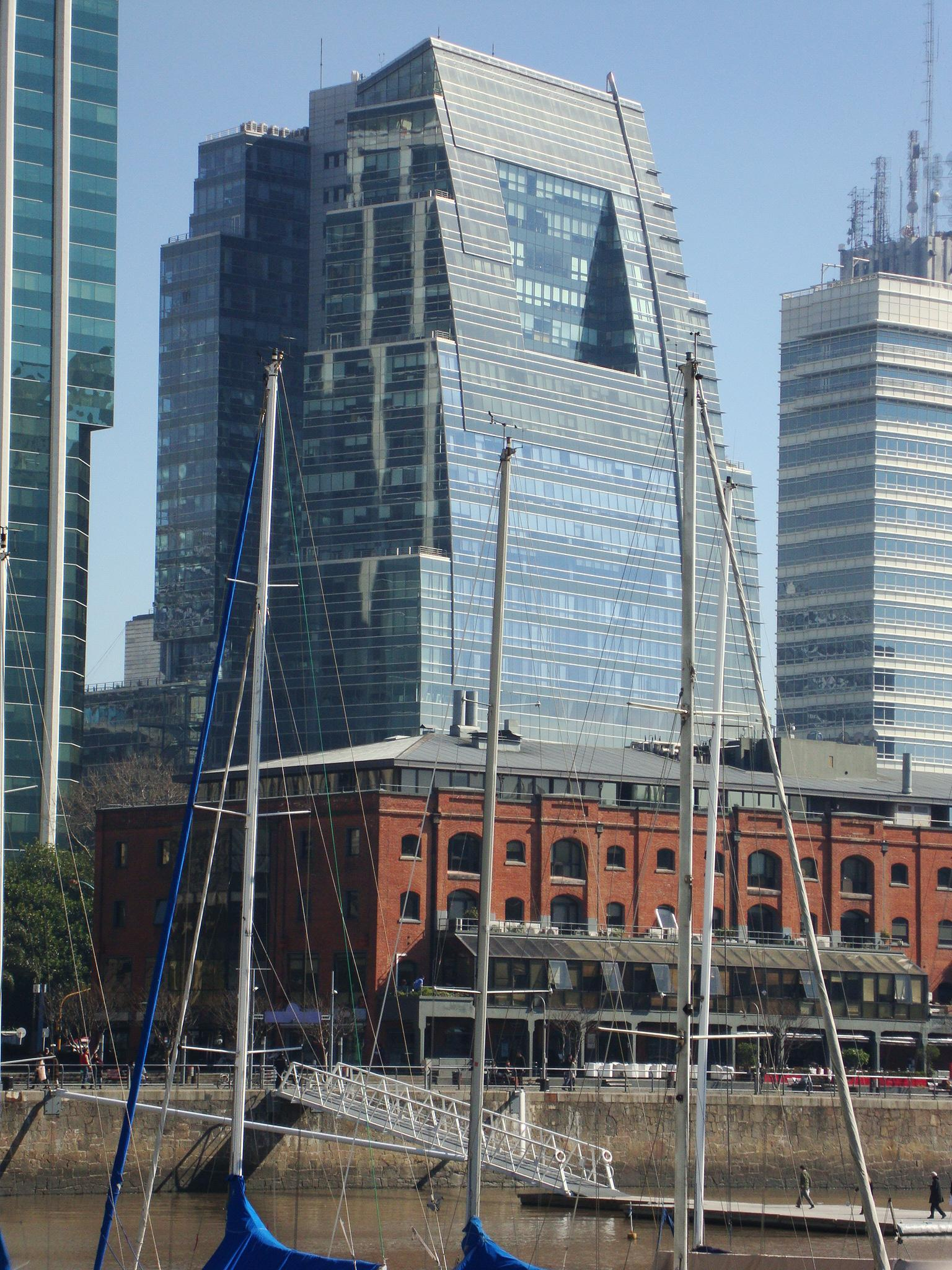
The Bouchard Plaza Tower

Bouchard Plaza is an architecturally significant office building in the San Nicolás ward of Buenos Aires, Argentina.

== Overview ==
The site of the building, on 557 Bouchard Street, was originally occupied by the printing house of La Nación. The daily newspaper, founded by President Bartolomé Mitre, remains among the most widely circulated in Argentina.

The company contracted SEPRA Arquitectos for the design of new editorial offices in 1960, while retaining its Plateresque Florida Street headquarters. Inaugurated in 1969, the drab, two-story building (with three underground floors) was enlarged by the addition of four floors to the existing building, and La Nación relocated its headquarters to this new structure upon its completion in 1979. Flanked by leafy Roma Square to the south, the building's shipping and receiving department was shifted to the opposite, Eduardo Madero Avenue side.

The publisher was joined by industrial conglomerate Techint and Banco Santander Argentina in a US$40 million investment for the construction of a new office building. Designed by Hellmuth, Obata and Kassabaum in 2000, the Postmodern addition was built on steel columns around the existing building, which allowed for its ongoing use while construction continued. Built by Estudio Aisenson contractors, Bouchard Plaza was inaugurated in 2004 with 26 stories and 100 meters (328 feet) in height; its 65,000 m^{2} (700,000 ft^{2}) made it one of the largest office buildings by floor area in the country.

La Nación relocated its printing house to the southern Barracas district. It retained its corporate headquarters in Bouchard Plaza, however, and shares the building with the Argentine offices of Techint and Price Waterhouse Coopers, among others. The property was acquired by local real estate developer IRSA in 2007.
