= Sheraton Buenos Aires Hotel & Convention Center =

Hotel in Buenos Aires, Argentina

Coordinates: 34°35′35″S 58°22′21″W

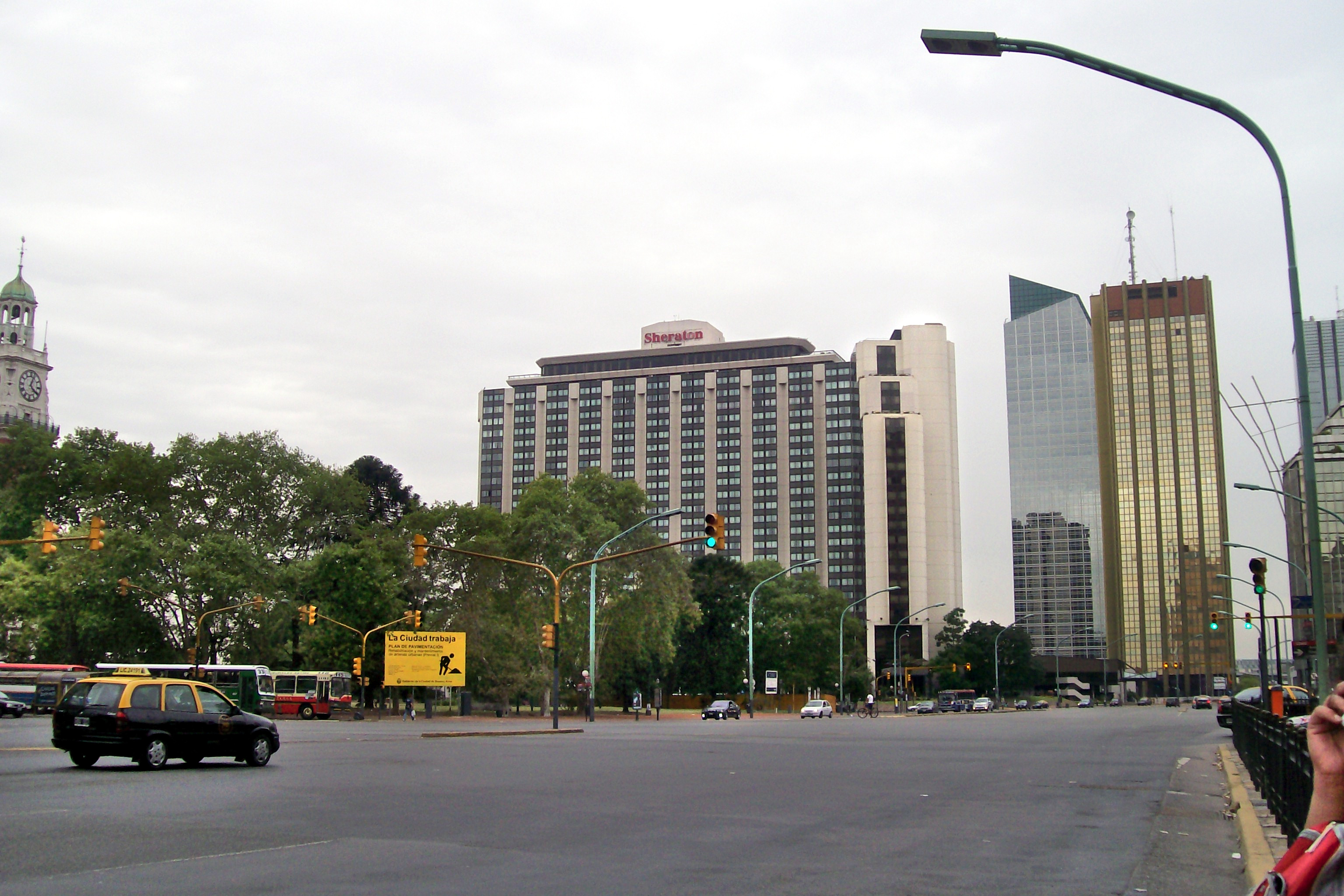
The Sheraton Buenos Aires Hotel, 2009.

The Sheraton Buenos Aires Hotel & Convention Center is a five-star hotel located in the District of Retiro, Buenos Aires, Argentina.

== History ==
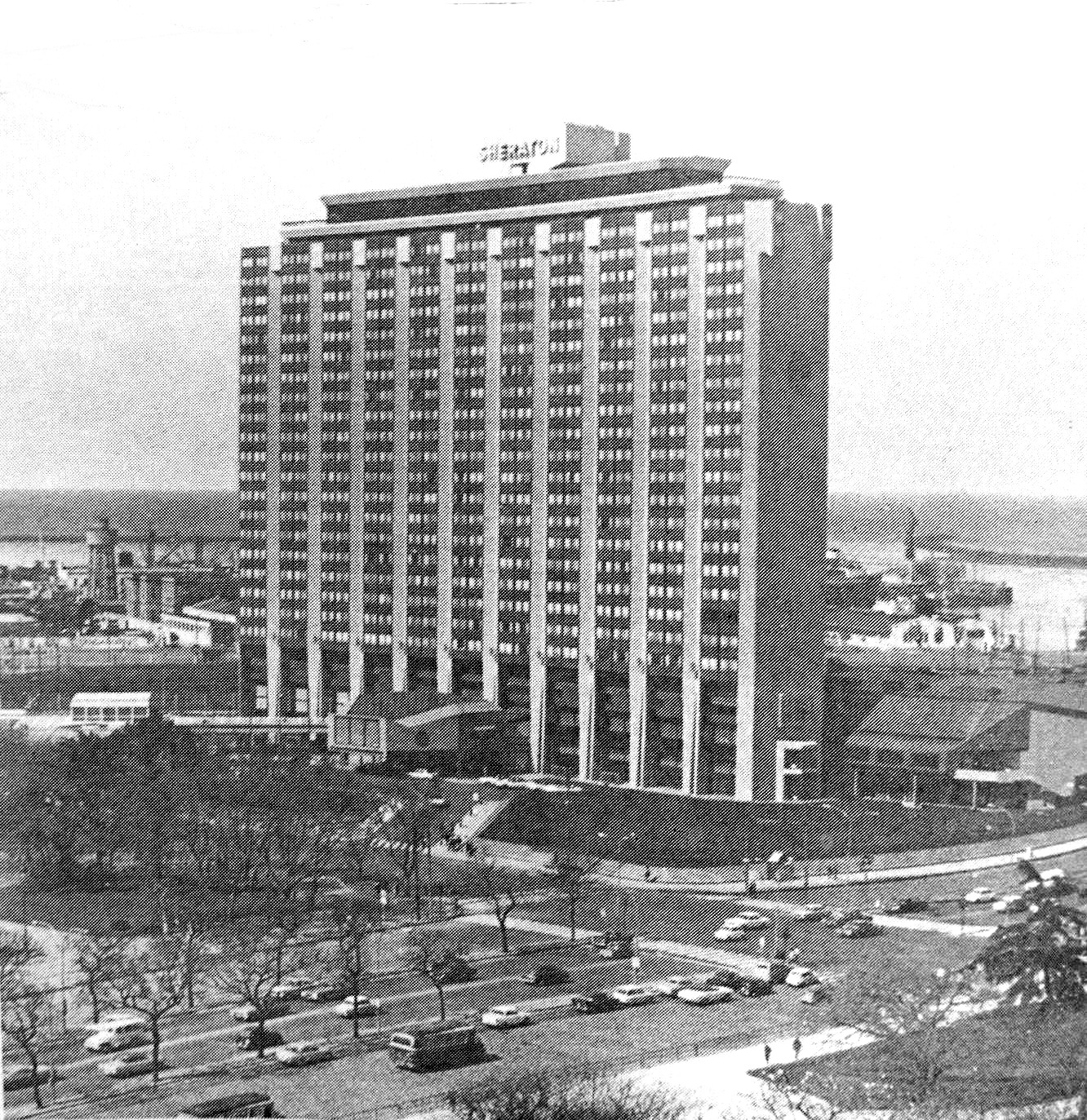
The Buenos Aires-Sheraton Hotel in 1976, as originally constructed, before the addition of the Park Tower wing.

A municipal ordinance enacted in 1967 commissioned the Municipal Department of Architecture and Urbanism (MCBA) to create the Catalinas Norte office park, touching off an important urban redevelopment effort in what had been a derelict area of the Port of Buenos Aires. The northernmost parcel in the district, a 26,700 m^{2} (287,000 ft^{2}) lot, was sold by MCBA to local developer Kokourek S.A. on October 22, 1968, and plans were approved for the development of the Hostal Santa María de los Buenos Aires, which would become the first Sheraton Hotel in Argentina.

Ground was broken on the project by Mayor Manuel Iricíbar on June 26, 1969, and the hotel was inaugurated as the Buenos Aires-Sheraton Hotel on August 24, 1972. The building, one of the first Argentine hotels built in the International style, was designed by SEPRA architects Santiago Sánchez Elía, Federico Peralta Ramos, and Alfredo Agostini; SEPRA would subsequently design numerous other high-rises in the district, and became one of the leading architectural firms in Argentina.

The 24-story hotel contained 739 rooms, with 33 suites located at either end of the building. The hotel featured restaurants and bars along a first floor promenade; an indoor shopping center; gardens; a convention center, including an auditorium with capacity for 230 people; two tennis courts; an outdoor swimming pool; an underground parking lot and a rooftop restaurant with a view of the Río de la Plata.

Soon after the hotel opened, on October 16, 1972, it was the site of a terrorist attack. A powerful bomb ripped through room 2204, killing Canadian tourist Lois Crozier and injuring her husband and an American woman. Another bomb was discovered on the hotel's second floor and defused by police. The leftist Montoneros and the Fuerzas Armadas Revolucionarias later claimed responsibility for the attack.

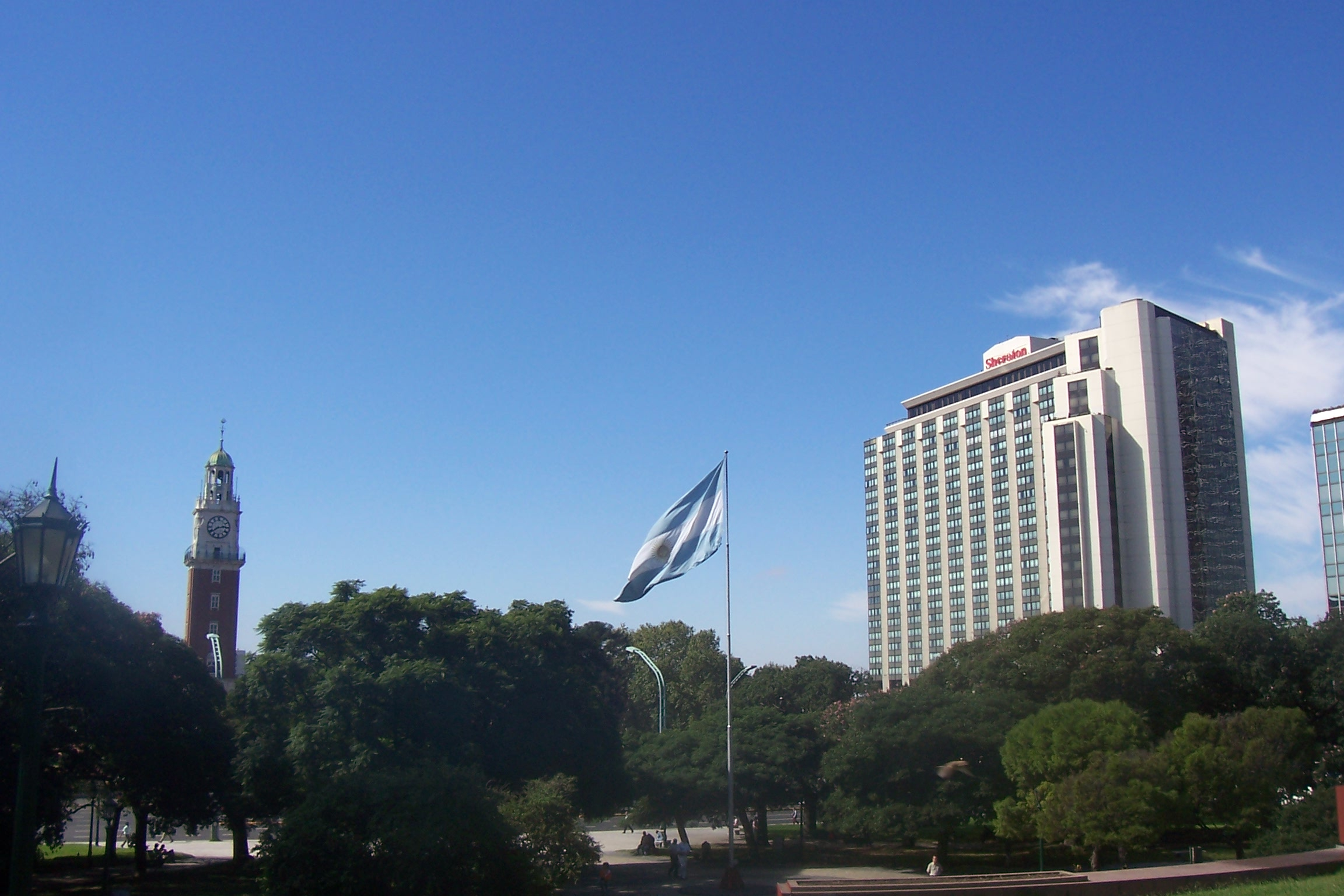
The Sheraton Buenos Aires Hotel and the Torre Monumental.

The hotel was expanded in 1996 with a connected 23-story wing marketed as a separate hotel, the Park Tower, a member of The Luxury Collection. The new 23-story 91 m (299 ft) tower added 181 rooms and suites. At the same time as the Park Tower was added, the hotel became the Sheraton Buenos Aires Hotel & Convention Center, doubling its meeting capacity to 2,000 with the opening of the new Convention Center in March 1996. A Neptune Pool & Fitness Center was added in December. The combined facilities became the single largest hotel complex in Latin America.

Among the first notable guests following these additions were international Korean businessman Sun Myung Moon and former U.S. President George H. W. Bush, who were on hand in November, 1996, to inaugurate Tiempos del Mundo (a News World Communications news daily published until 2007).

== Notable guests ==
- Rita Hayworth
- Ayrton Senna
- Xi Jinping
- Brad Pitt and Gwyneth Paltrow
- Princess Stéphanie of Monaco
- Stevie Wonder
- Queen
- Luis Miguel and Mariah Carey
- Frank Sinatra
- Barry White
- Geraldine Chaplin
- Eric Clapton
- Tina Turner
- Bill Clinton and Hillary Clinton
- Jacqueline Bisset
- Muhammad Ali
