= Torre Bouchard =

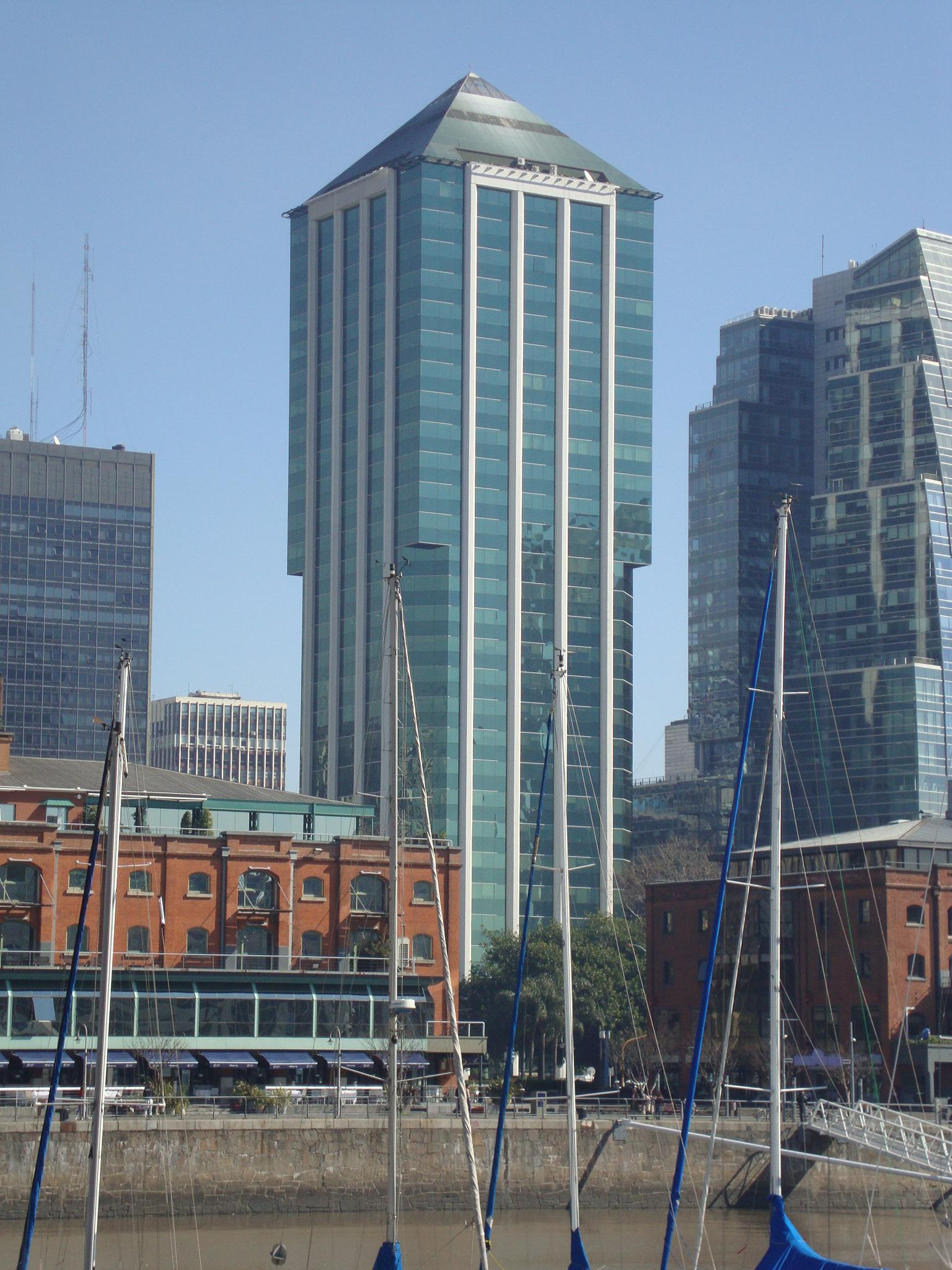

- Location within Buenos Aires

General information
- Status: Completed
- Type: Skyscraper
- Architectural style: Postmodernism
- Classification: Commercial offices
- Location: Buenos Aires Central Business District, Avenida Bouchard 547, Buenos Aires, Argentina
- Coordinates: 34°36′5.335″S 58°22′8.083″W
- Completed: 1996

Height
- Architectural: 110 metres (360 ft)
- Tip: 110 metres (360 ft)
- Roof: 110 metres (360 ft)

Technical details
- Floor count: 30

Design and construction
- Architecture firm: Sanchez Elia SEPRA

Torre Bouchard is a 30-story high skyscraper in Buenos Aires, Argentina. The building houses offices for several international companies, such as The Boston Consulting Group, Weatherford, and Aerolíneas Argentinas. The World Bank has also placed its Argentina offices in the tower.

The building was designed in 1991 by SEPRA Arquitectos, a local architectural firm whose stamp is on numerous other high-rises in the Catalinas Norte office park. The Bouchard Tower was inaugurated in 1996 and is 110 m (361 ft) high, and includes 36,025 m^{2} (388,000 ft²) of indoor space.
