= San Nicolás, Buenos Aires =

Coordinates: 34°36′19″S 58°22′33″W

San Nicolás
- Neighborhood
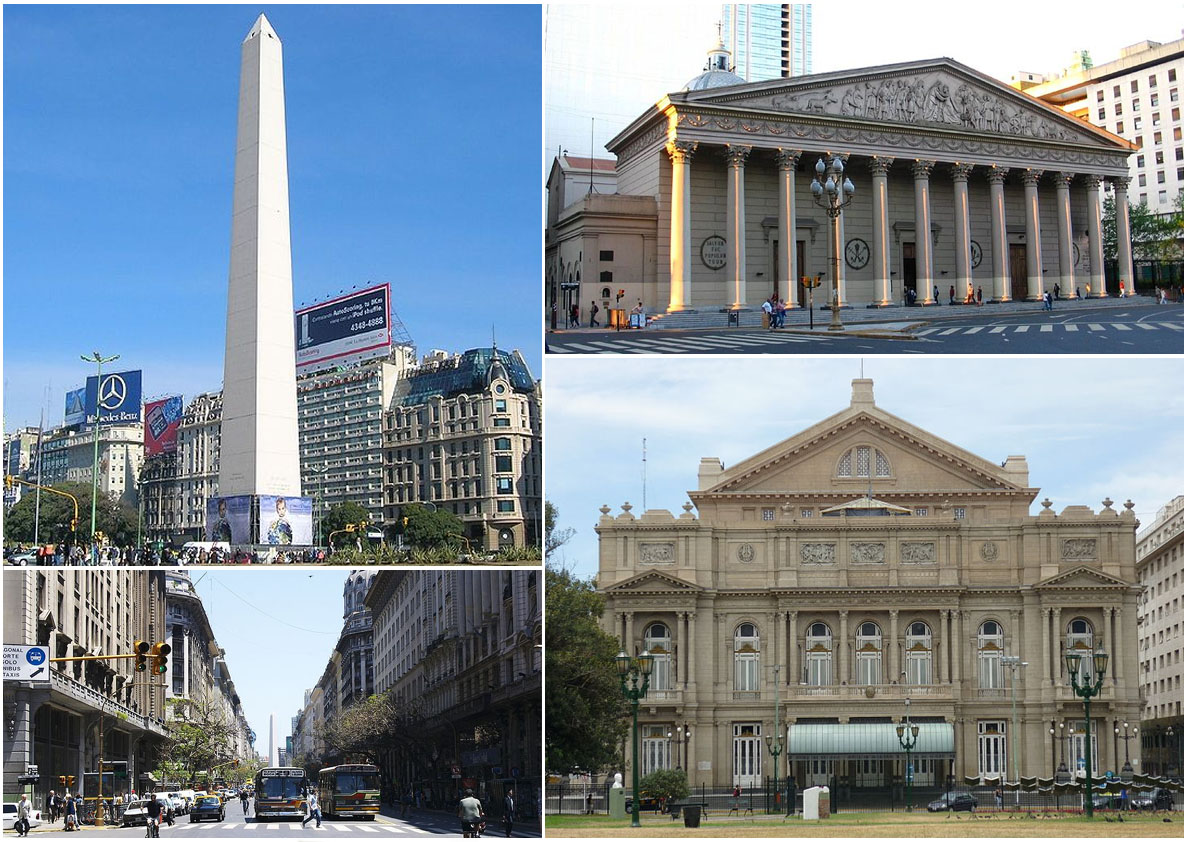
- Clockwise from top: the Obelisco, the Metropolitan Cathedral, Diagonal Norte and the Colon Theatre.

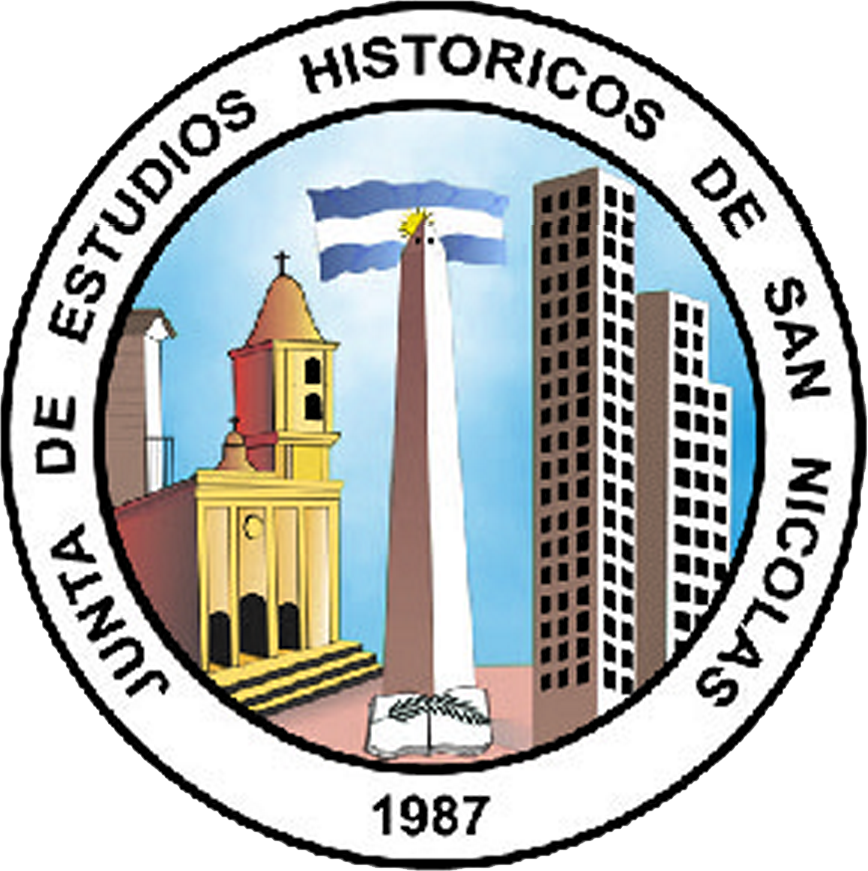
- Emblem
- Location of San Nicolás in Buenos Aires
- Country: Argentina
- Autonomous City: Buenos Aires
- Comuna: C1
- Important sites: Palace of Justice · Teatro Colón · Buenos Aires Metropolitan Cathedral · Obelisk of Buenos Aires · National Bank of Argentina · Central Bank of Argentina · Central Post Office · San Martín Cultural Center · Galerías Pacífico

Area
  - Total: 2.4 km^{2} (0.93 sq mi)

Population (2001)
  - Total: 33,305
  - Density: 14,000/km^{2} (36,000/sq mi)
- Time zone: UTC-3 (ART)
- The neighbourhood is usually referred to as El Centro.

San Nicolás is one of the neighbourhoods of Buenos Aires, Argentina, sharing most of the city and national government Neighborhood of Buenos Aires with neighboring Montserrat and home to much of the financial sector. It is referred usually as El Centro ("The Centre"), and the part east of the 9 de Julio Avenue is known as Microcentro.

The limits of the neighbourhood are the Córdoba, Callao, Rivadavia, La Rábida Norte and Eduardo Madero Avenues. The district is home to 33,305 inhabitants.

== History ==
The area was named for the San Nicolás Parish, consecrated in 1773. Demolished when work on Ninth of July Avenue started, the Obelisk of Buenos Aires now stands in its place. The future Metropolitan Cathedral of Buenos Aires was also built in the San Nicolás area between 1770 and 1822. Prospering following the establishment of the Viceroyalty of the Río de la Plata, Buenos Aires merchants had Boneo's Pier built in 1802, quickly becoming the city's main shipping terminal. The British Empire opened a consulate here in 1794, leading to the development of a sizable British community in the area, which became known as the "English borough." They founded the English Merchants' Society in 1810 and the British Consulate became home to the first modern bank in Buenos Aires, in 1822.

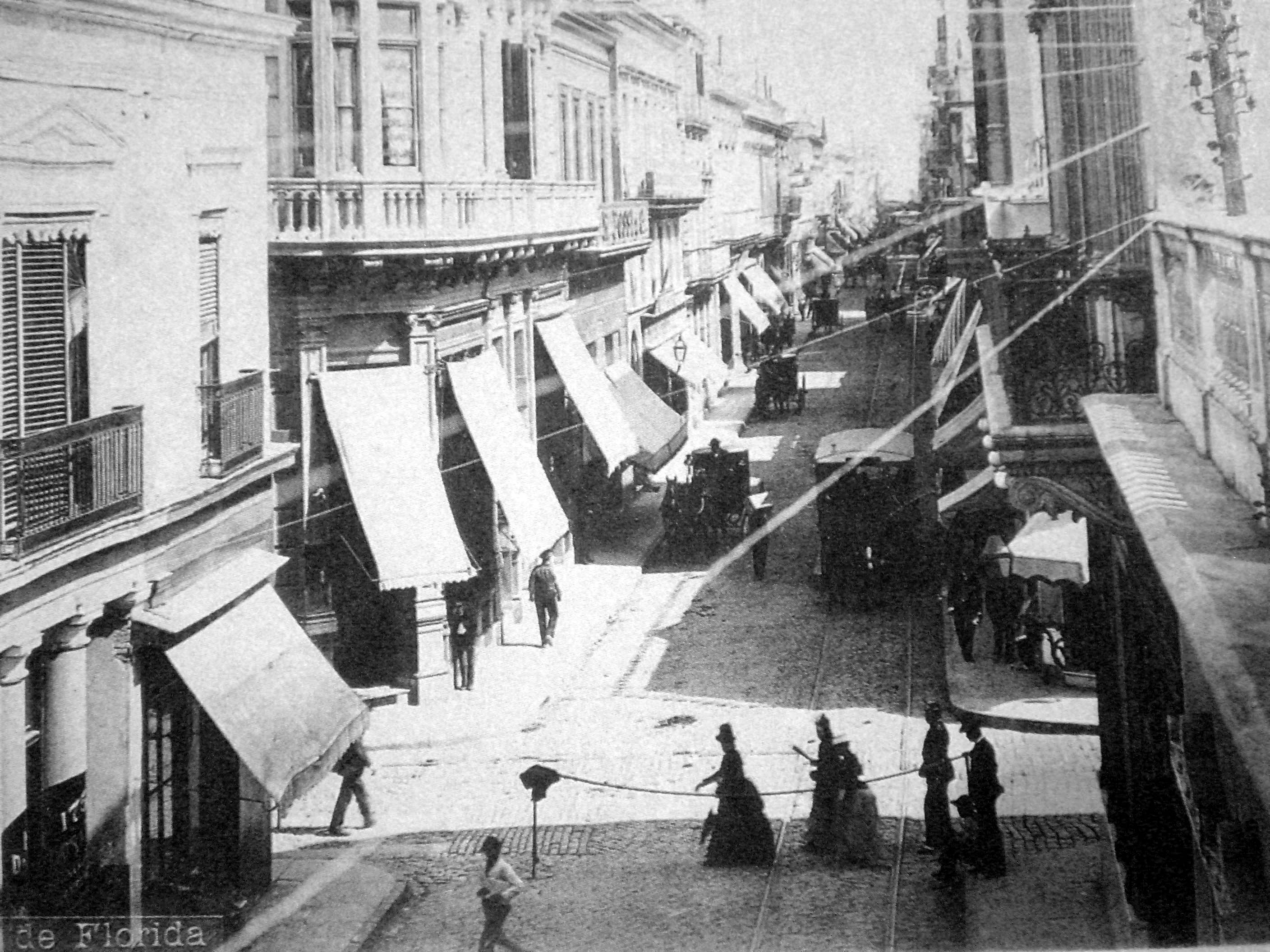
A San Nicolás street in 1888. The ward retains much of its colonial grid

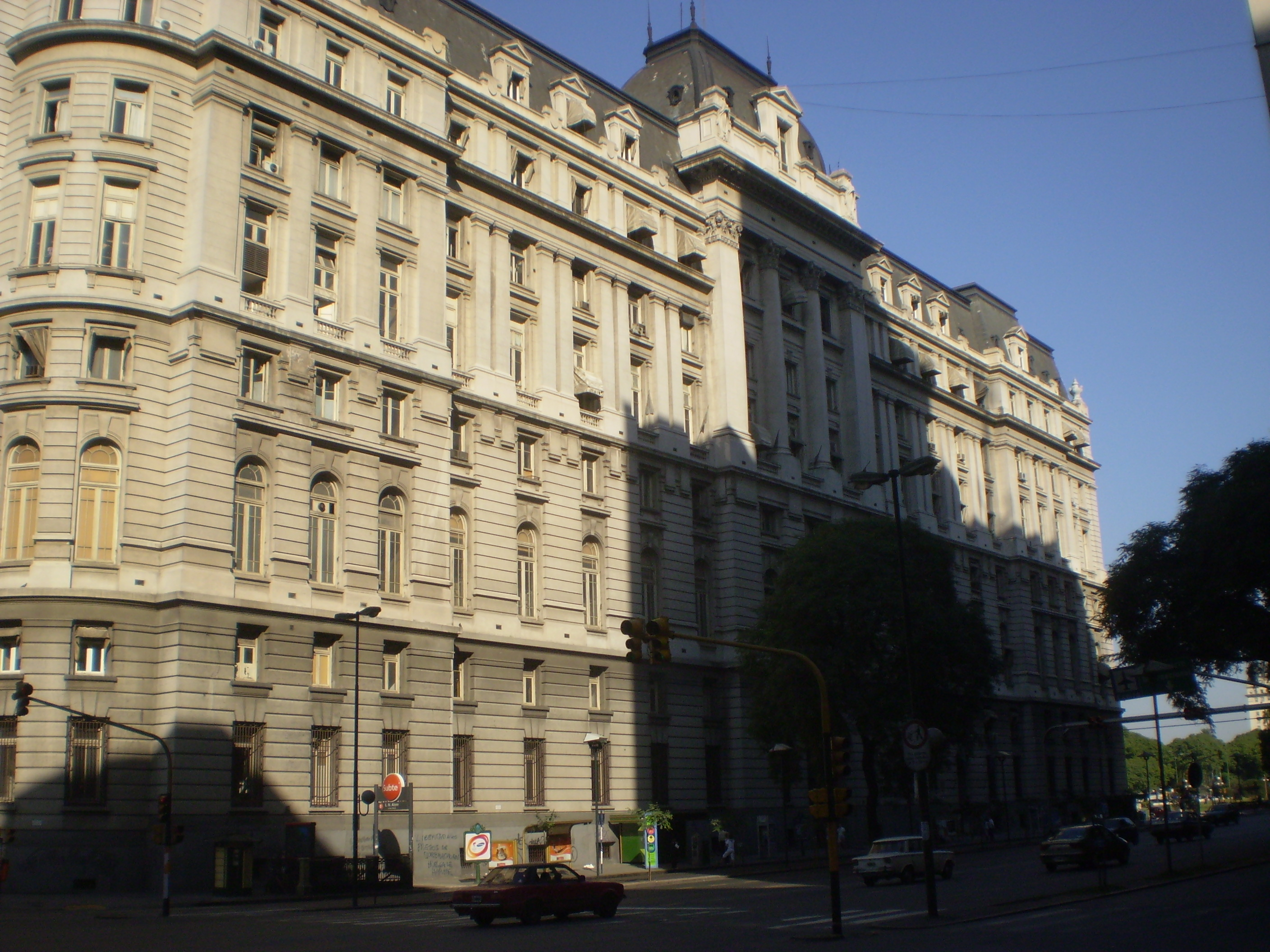
Former Central Post Office on Leandro Alem Avenue.

Enjoying close commercial ties to the British Empire, in 1830 Governor Juan Manuel de Rosas donated land in the area for the benefit of the new St. John the Baptist Anglican Church, the oldest in existence in Buenos Aires. A growing community from the United States established the first Methodist church nearby in 1836. The growing importance of the area as a financial center was highlighted by the 1854 establishment of the Buenos Aires Stock Exchange. San Nicolás remains the financial center of Argentina, something underscored by the presence of the Argentine Central Bank and the National Bank, Argentina's largest. This area also saw the opening of the first railway station in Latin America, which went in service in 1857, facing what today is the Colón Theatre.

Several well-known members of the English community lived in the neighborhood of San Nicolás, including the Gowland's, belonging to a London family. In 1862 the British established the Bank of London and Río de la Plata, located in the corners of the streets Piedad and Reconquista.

The rapid development of the Argentine economy after 1875 made itself evident in San Nicolás in the reclaiming of riverfront land, where the shore popular with washerwomen became the Paseo de Julio (today Leandro Alem Avenue) and lots such as the central artillery field became city parks. The area's network of horse-drawn trolleys gave way in 1913 to the first metro stations in the Southern Hemisphere and renowned institutions such as the Colón and Cervantes Theatres were followed in the 1920s and 1930s by the addition of Diagonal Norte Avenue, landmarks such as the Buenos Aires Central Post Office, and one of the greatest concentrations of popular theatres and cinemas in the world.

San Nicolás acquired its approximate, present layout when, in 1936, five city blocks were demolished (including numerous historical landmarks, such as the Mercado del Plata and the San Nicolás Parish) for the first stage of the Ninth of July Avenue.

== Economy ==
Incorporating most of the Buenos Aires Central Business District, San Nicolás is home to the headquarters of numerous leading Argentine firms, including Aerolíneas Argentinas, the National Bank, Banco Macro, Bank of the City of Buenos Aires, Bunge y Born, the Macri Group, and most of the Buenos Aires Stock Exchange leaders, as well as the local offices of a number of international companies, such as BankBoston, BBVA, Citibank, Deutsche Bank, HSBC, IBM, Microsoft, Santander Bank, and Techint.

It is also the location of much of the Florida Street retail district, the important Galerías Pacífico shopping arcade, Luna Park Arena, and the Corrientes Avenue cinema and theater district.

== Image gallery ==
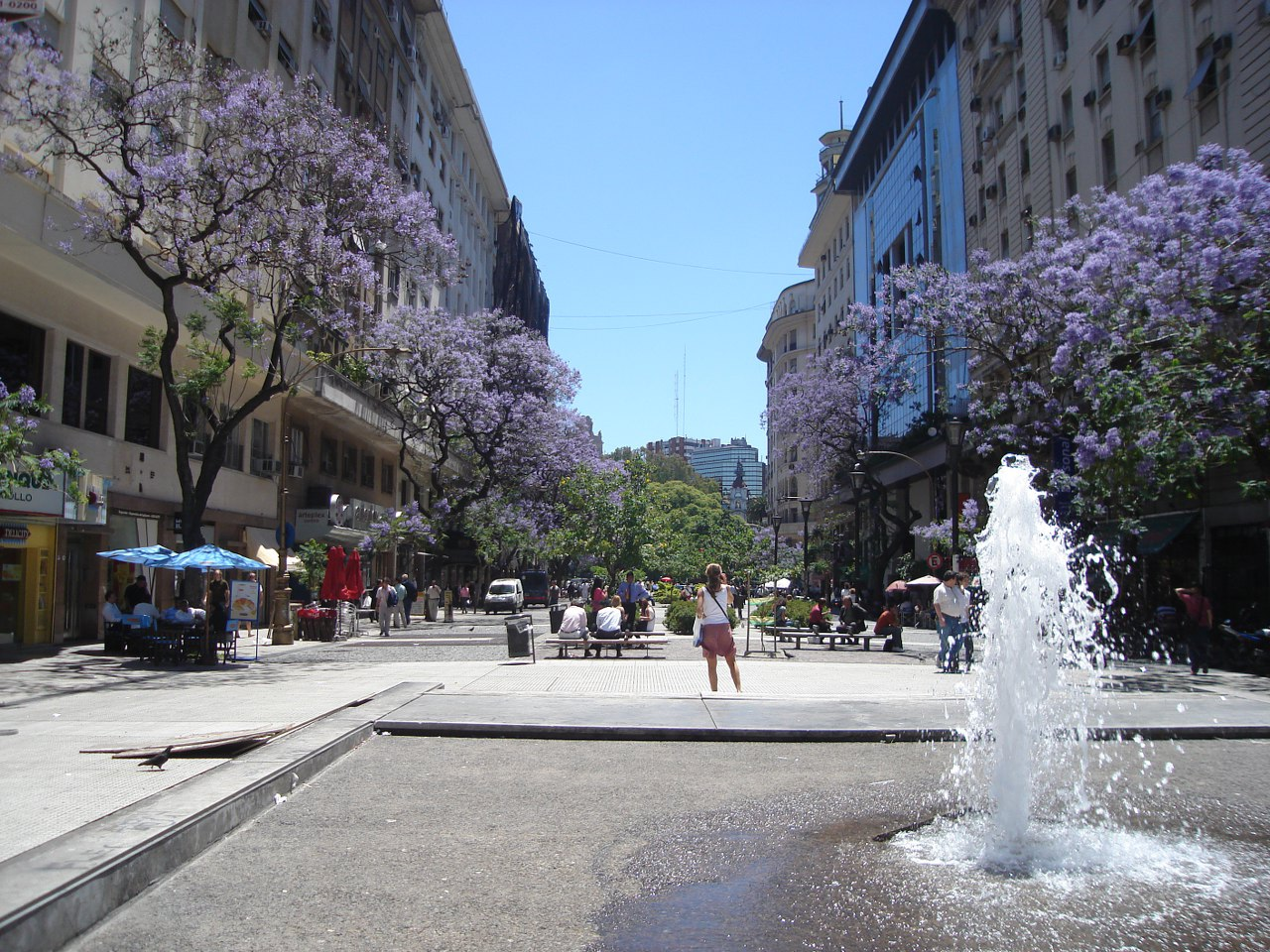
Pedestrian section of Diagonal Norte Avenue

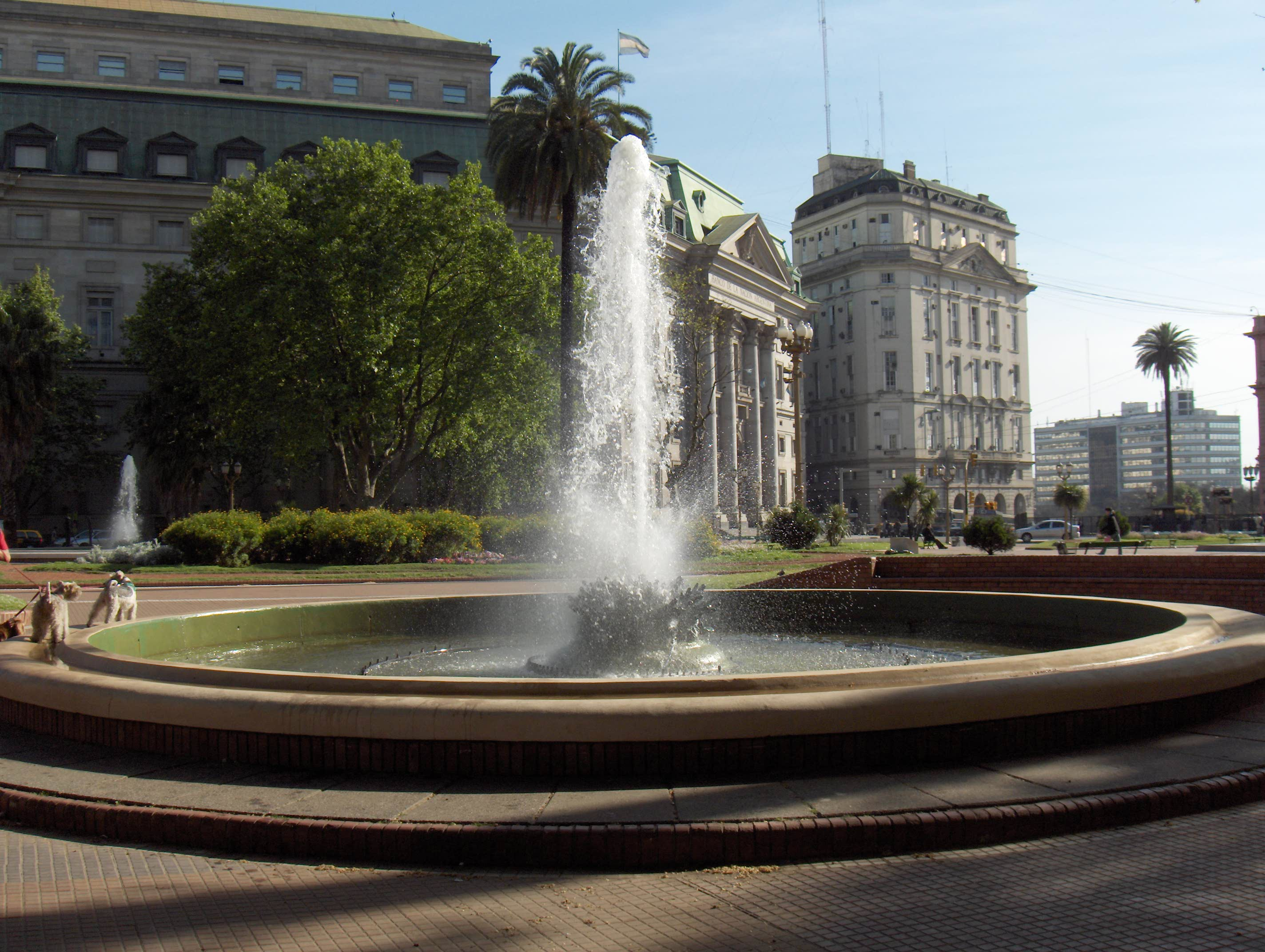
The National Bank and State Intelligence Offices (left to right)

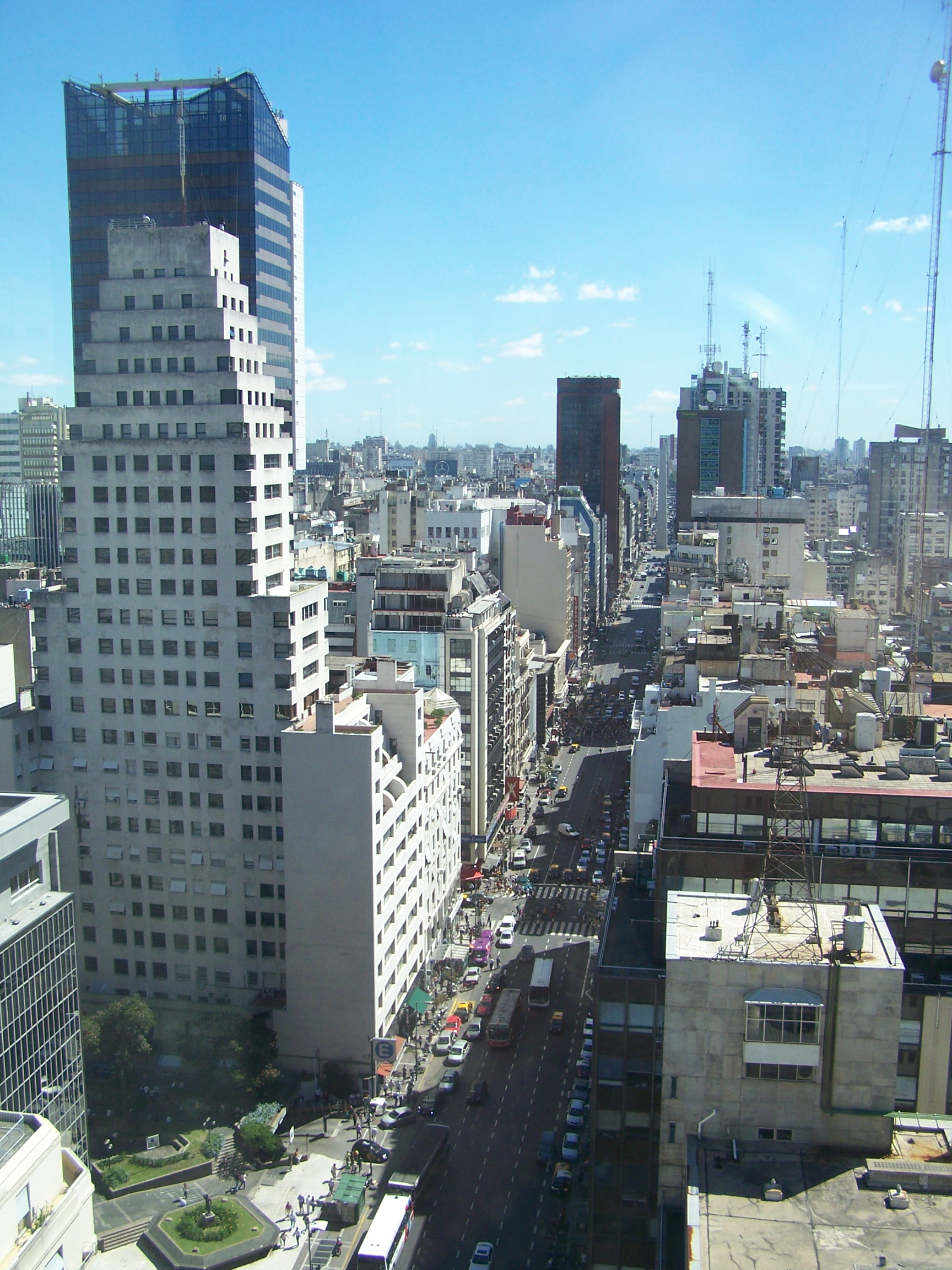
Corrientes Avenue

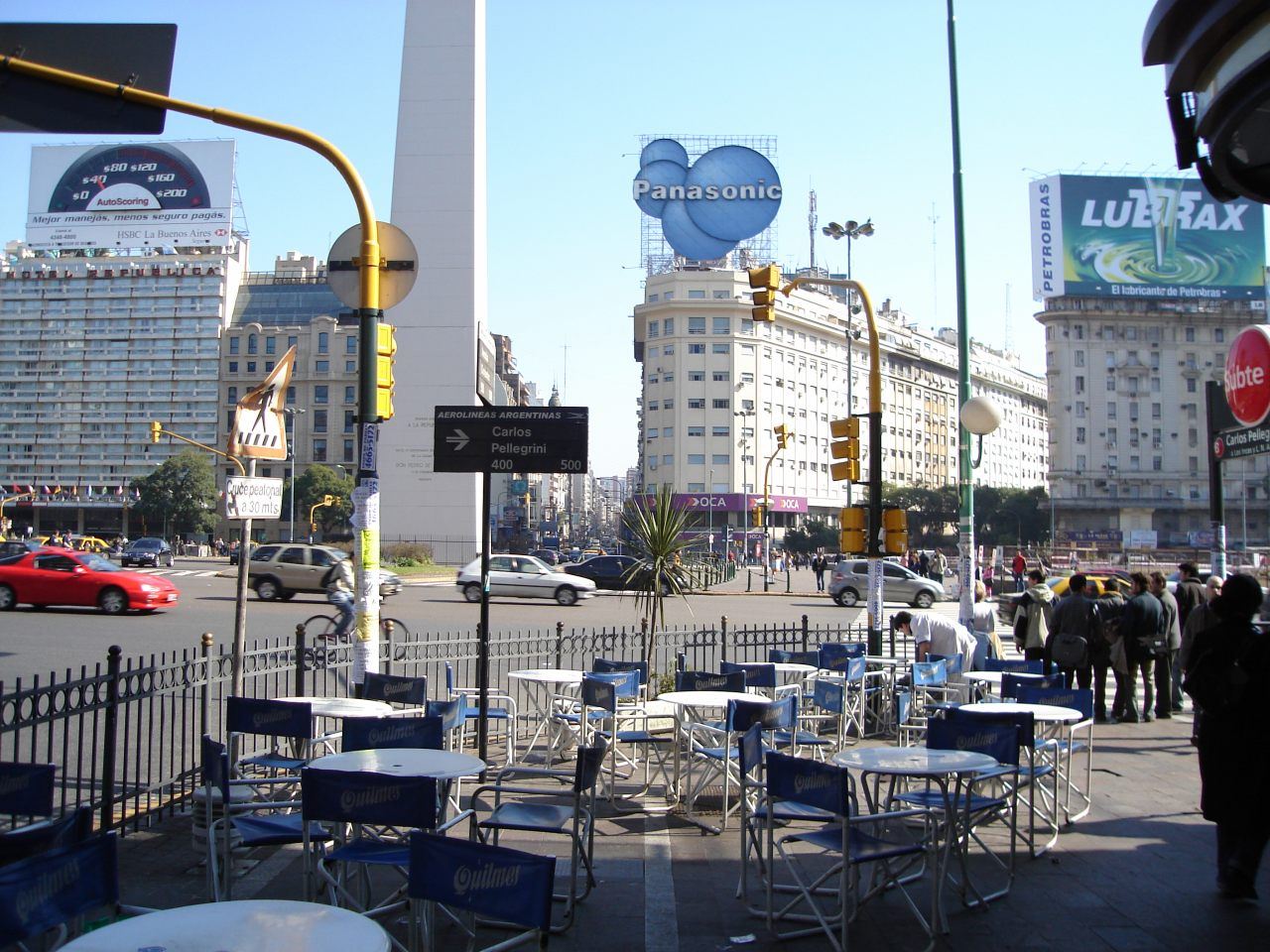
Corner of Corrientes and 9 July Avenues

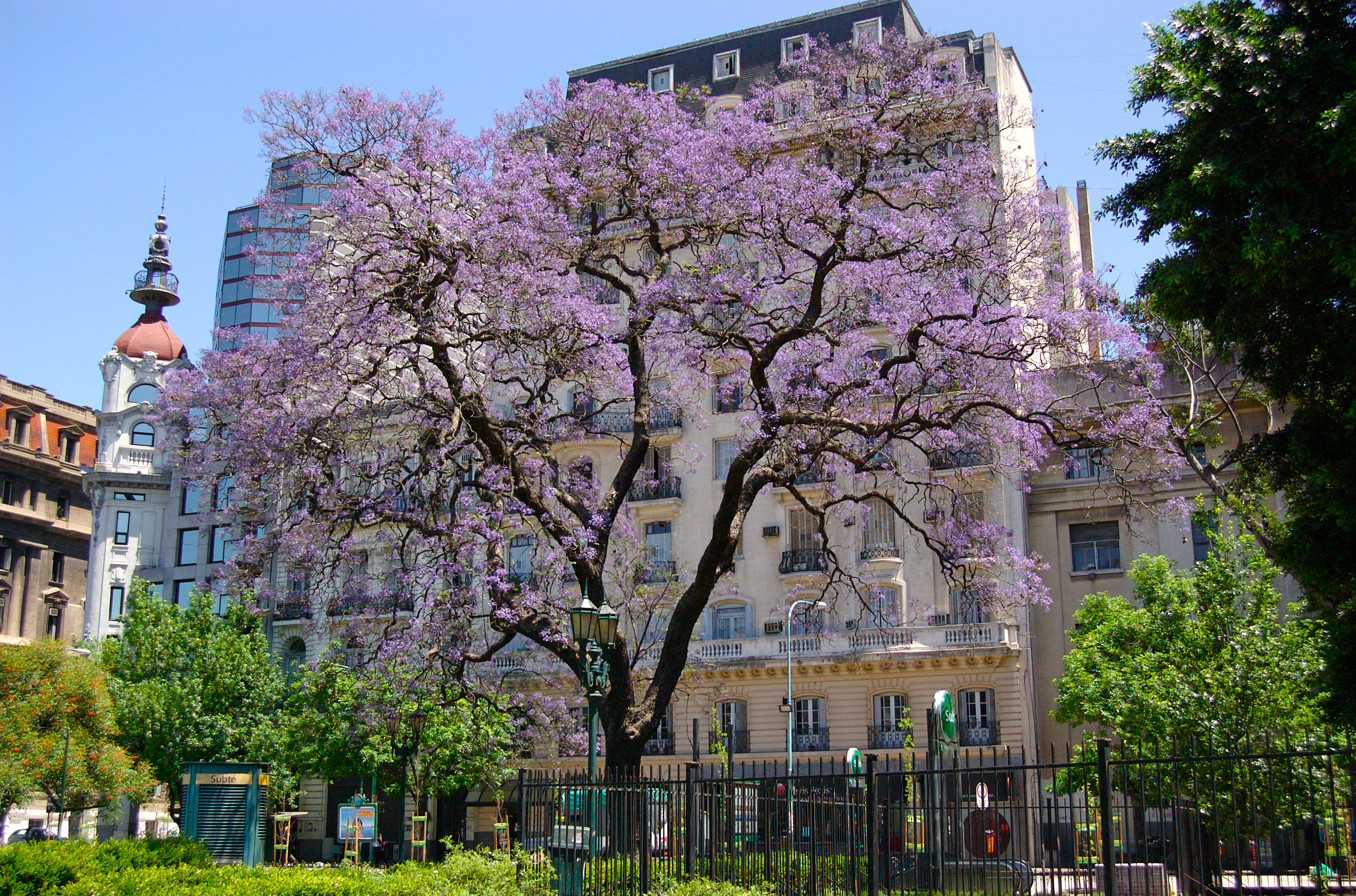
Jacarandas in bloom, Lavalle Park

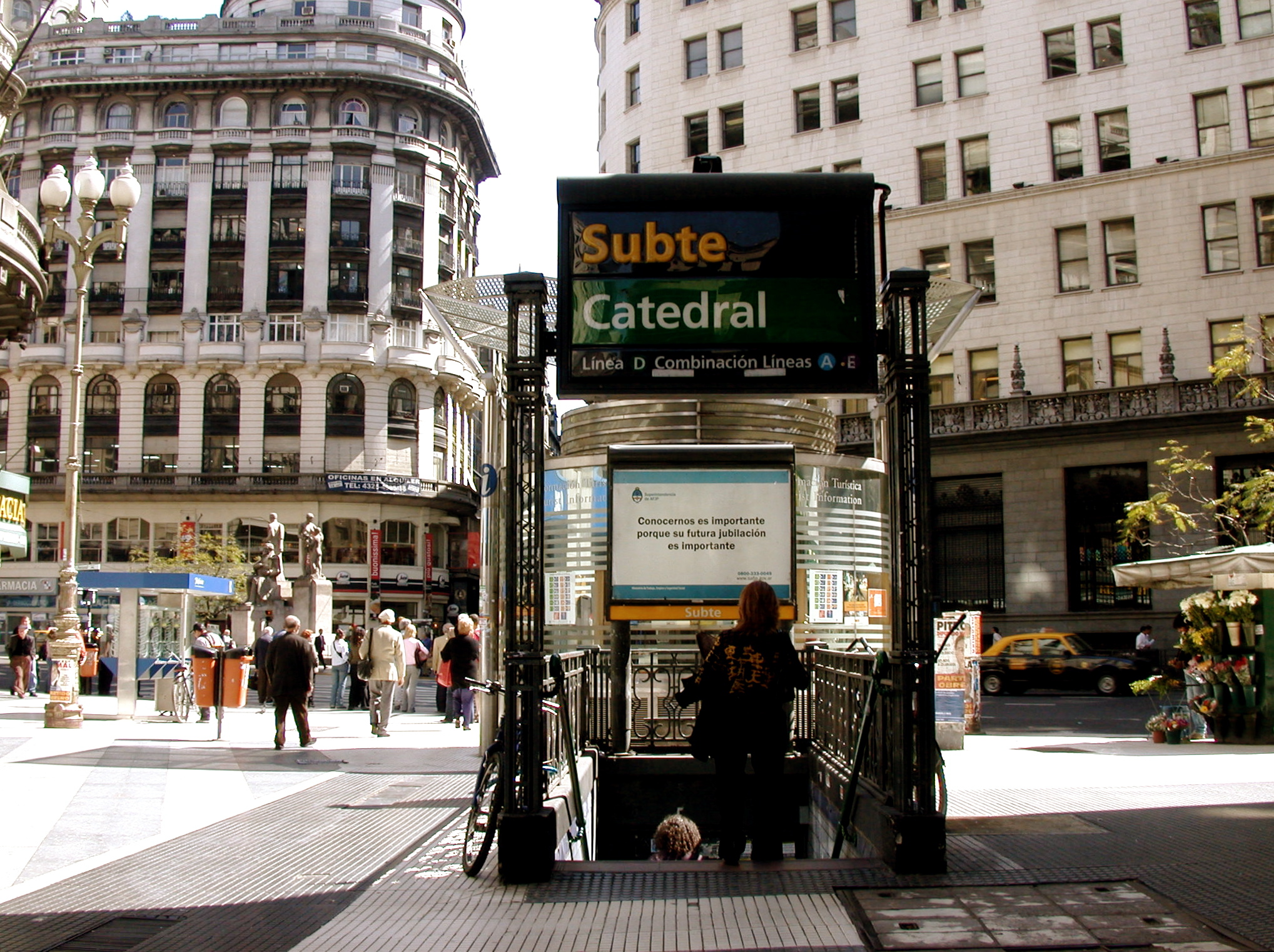
Florida Street at Diagonal Norte Avenue

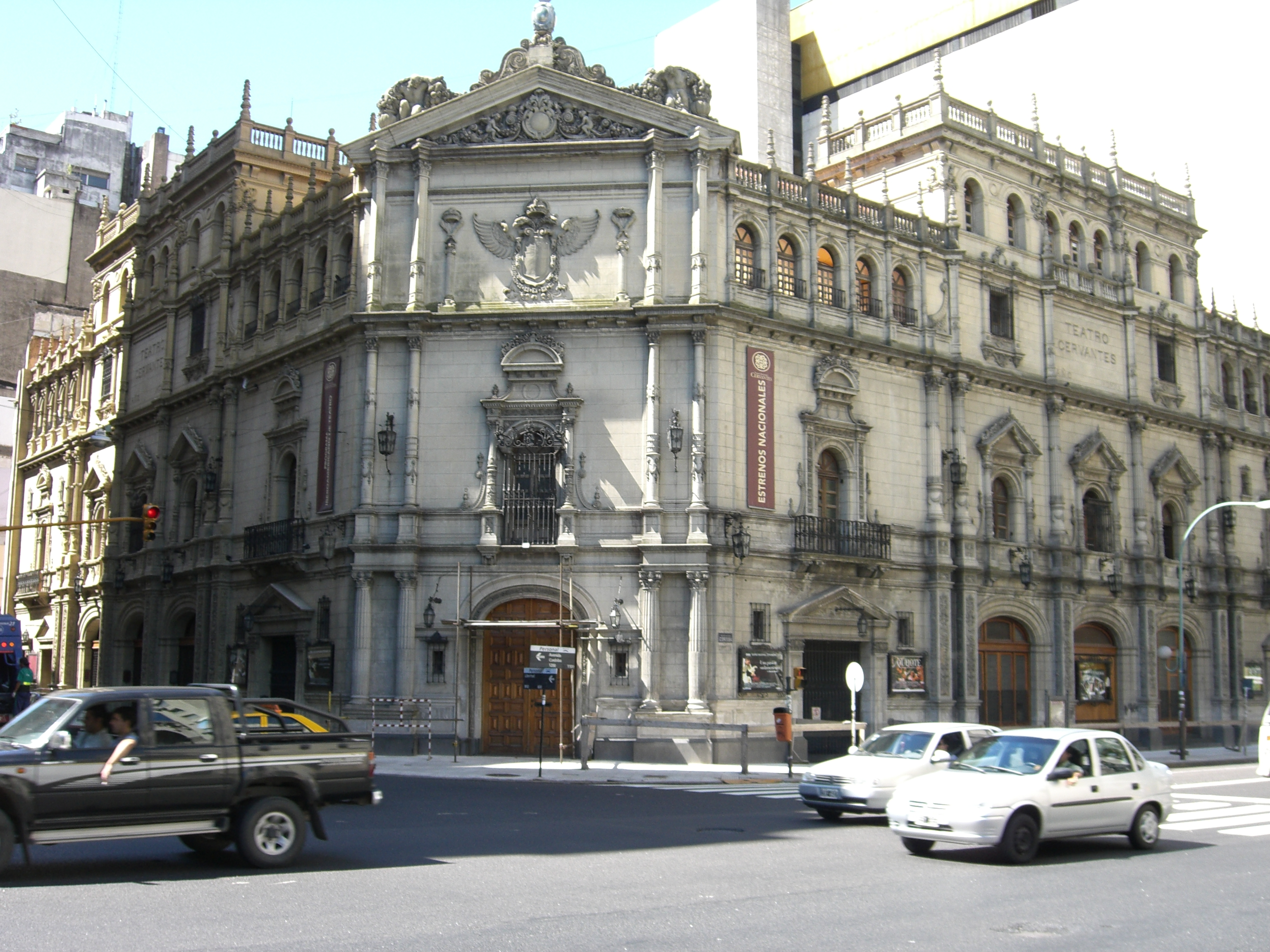
Cervantes Theatre

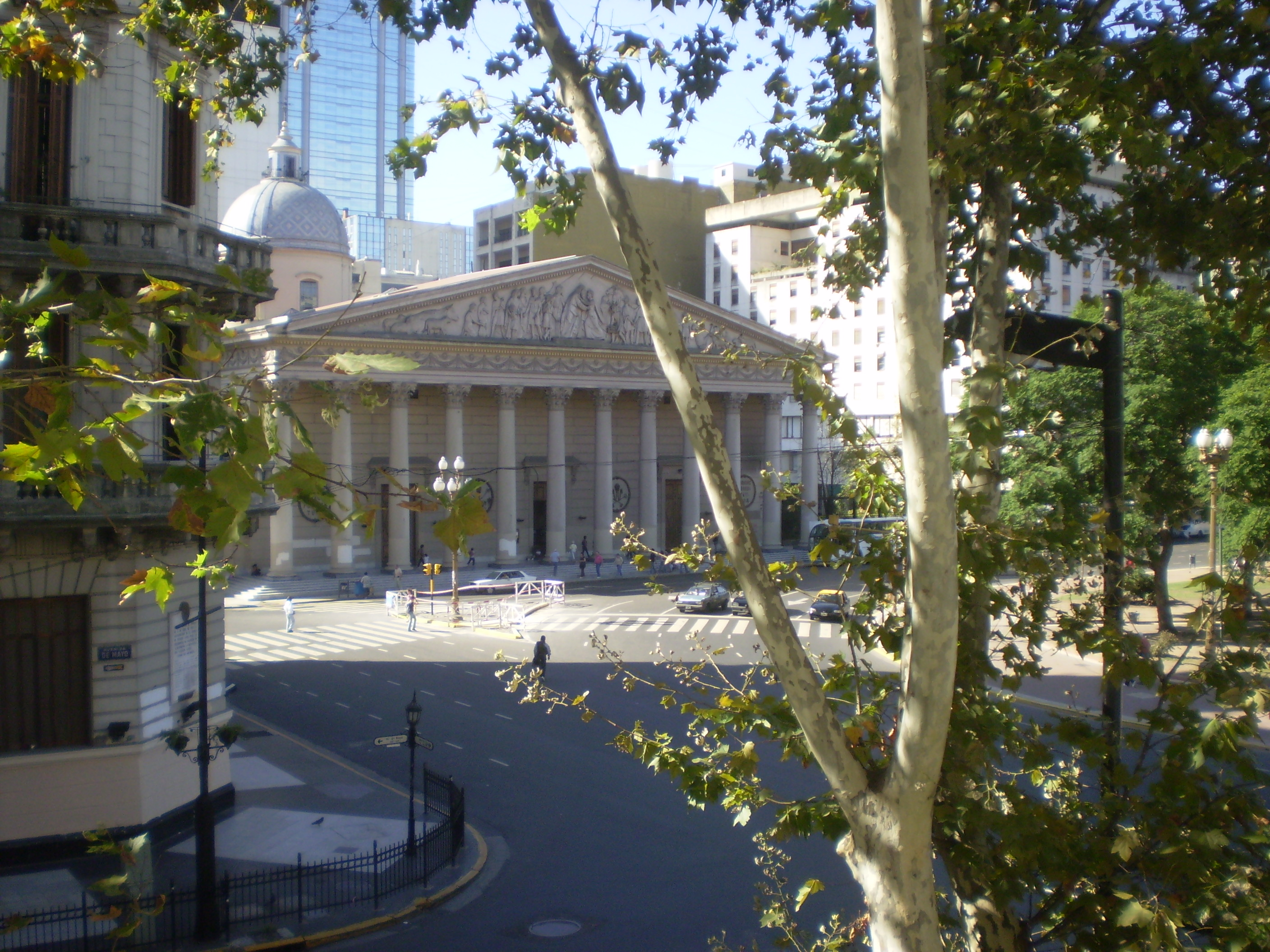
Buenos Aires Metropolitan Cathedral

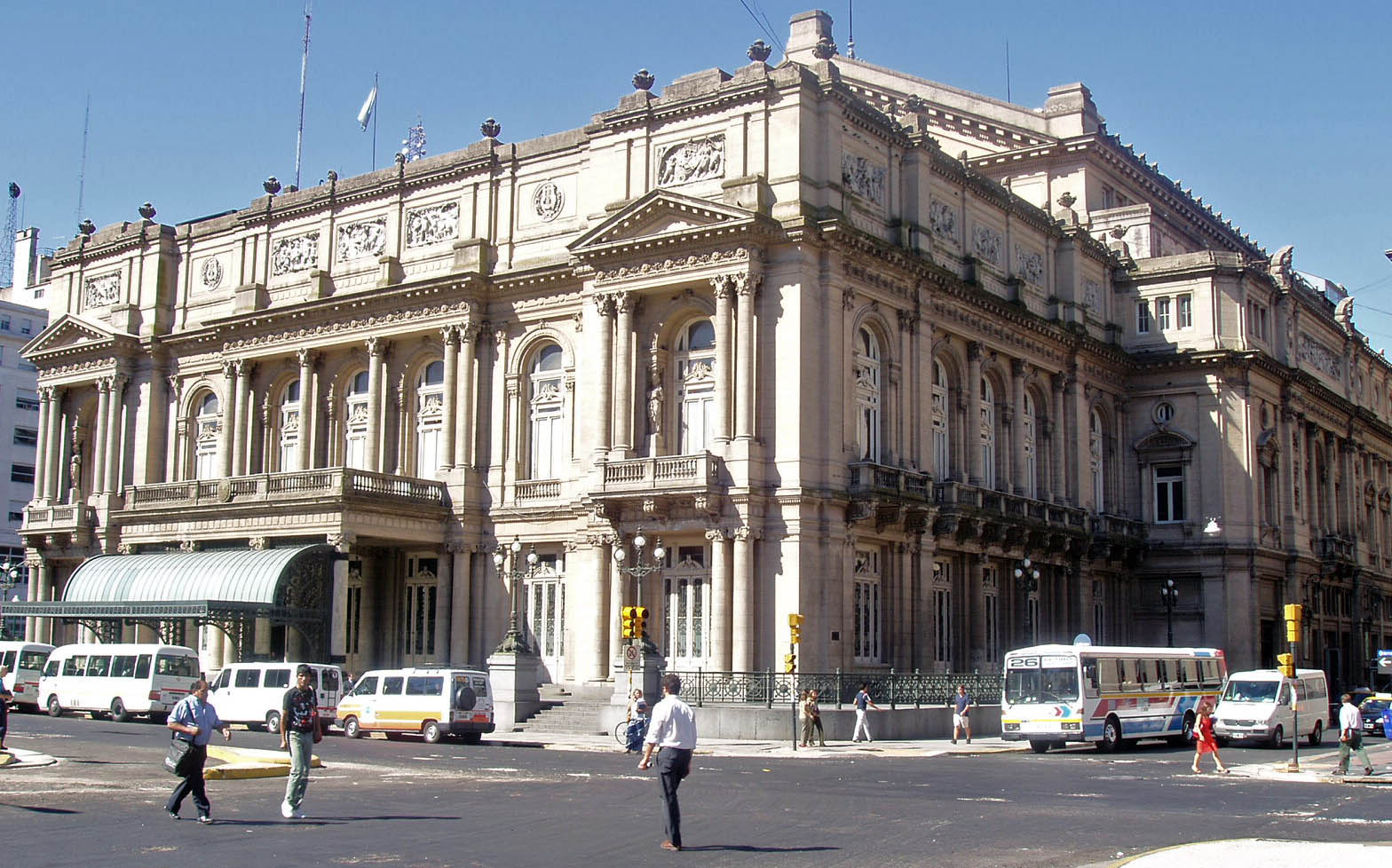
Teatro Colón

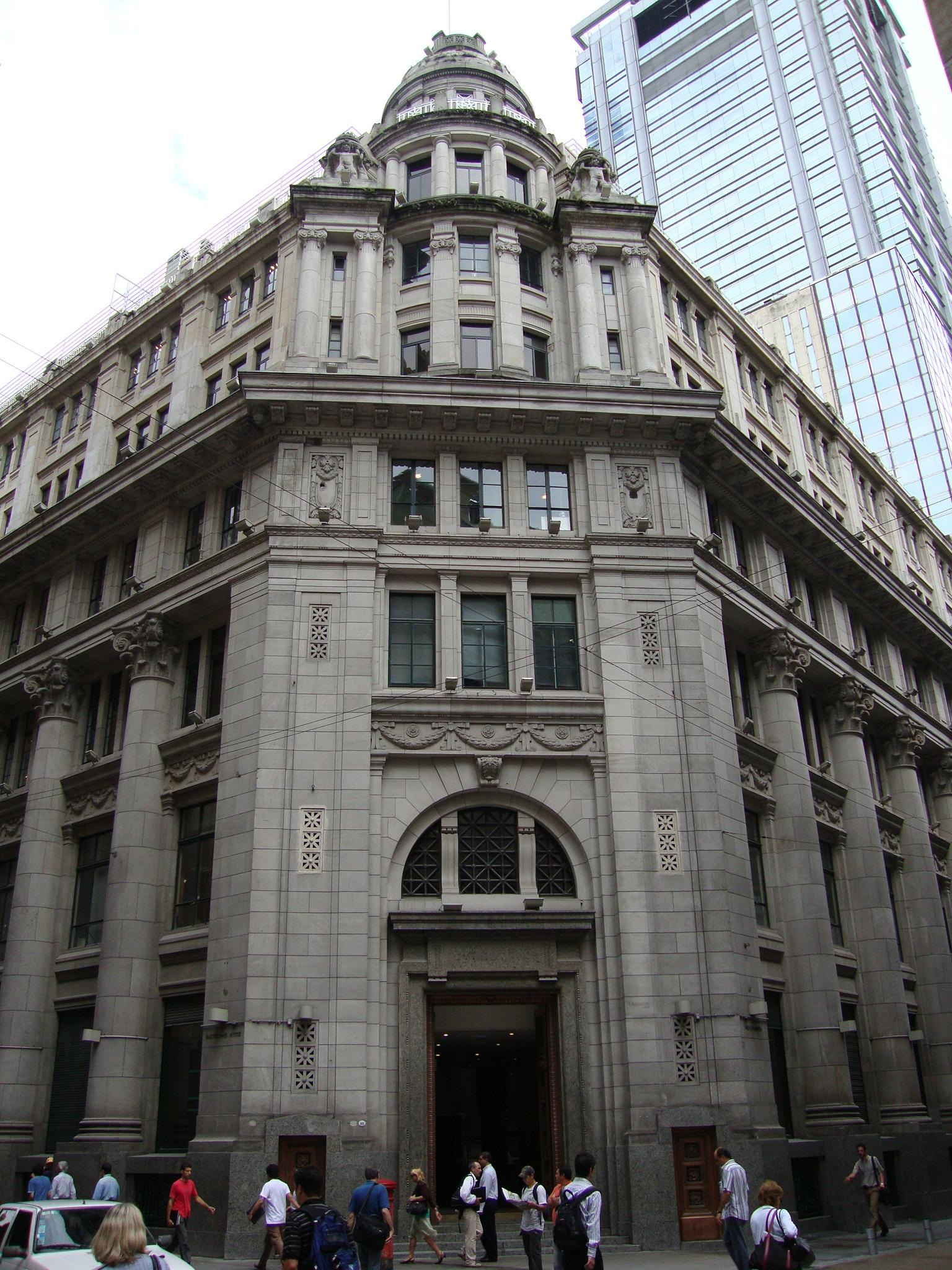
German Transatlantic Bank

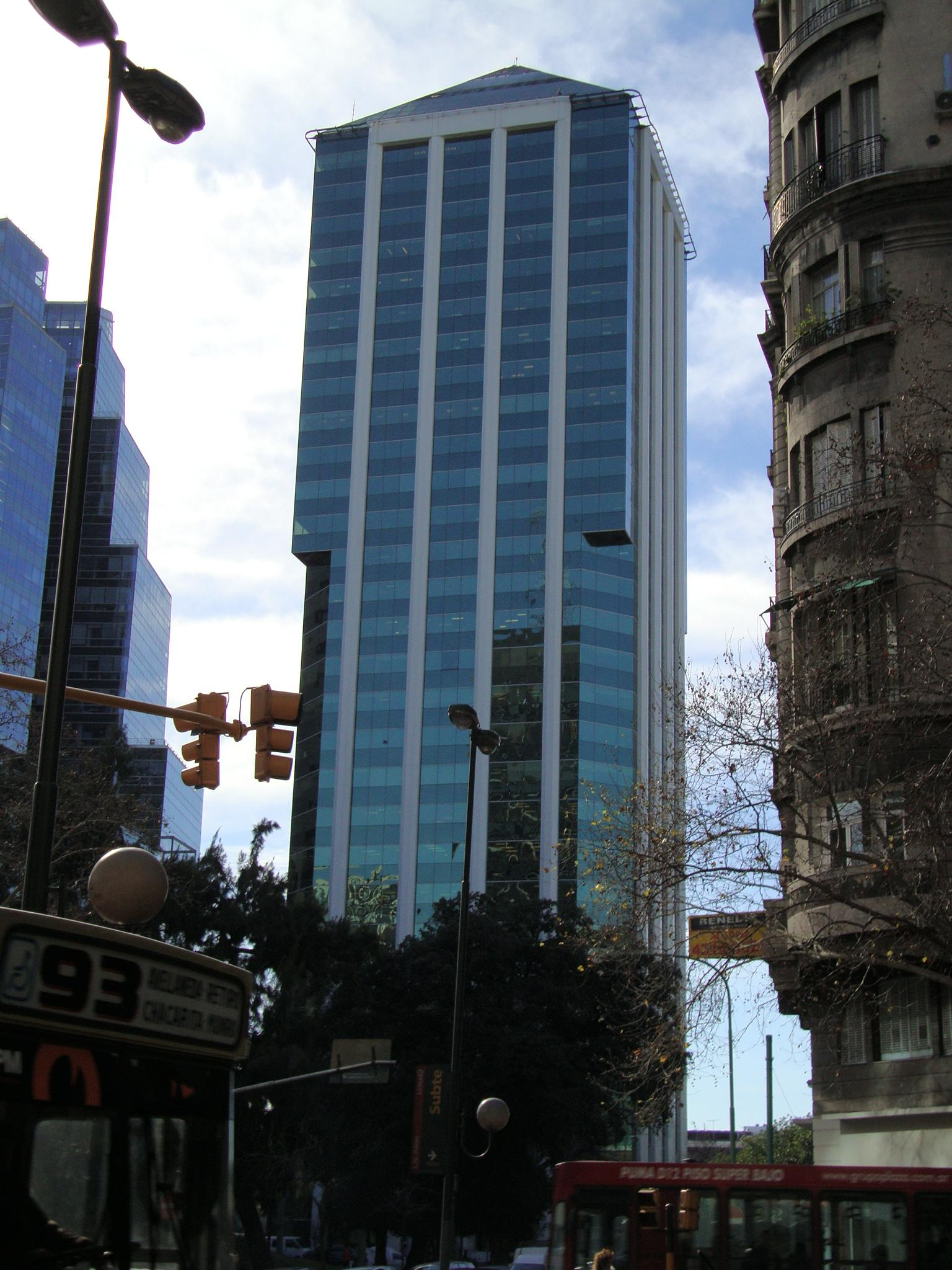
Torre Bouchard, the headquarters of Aerolíneas Argentinas

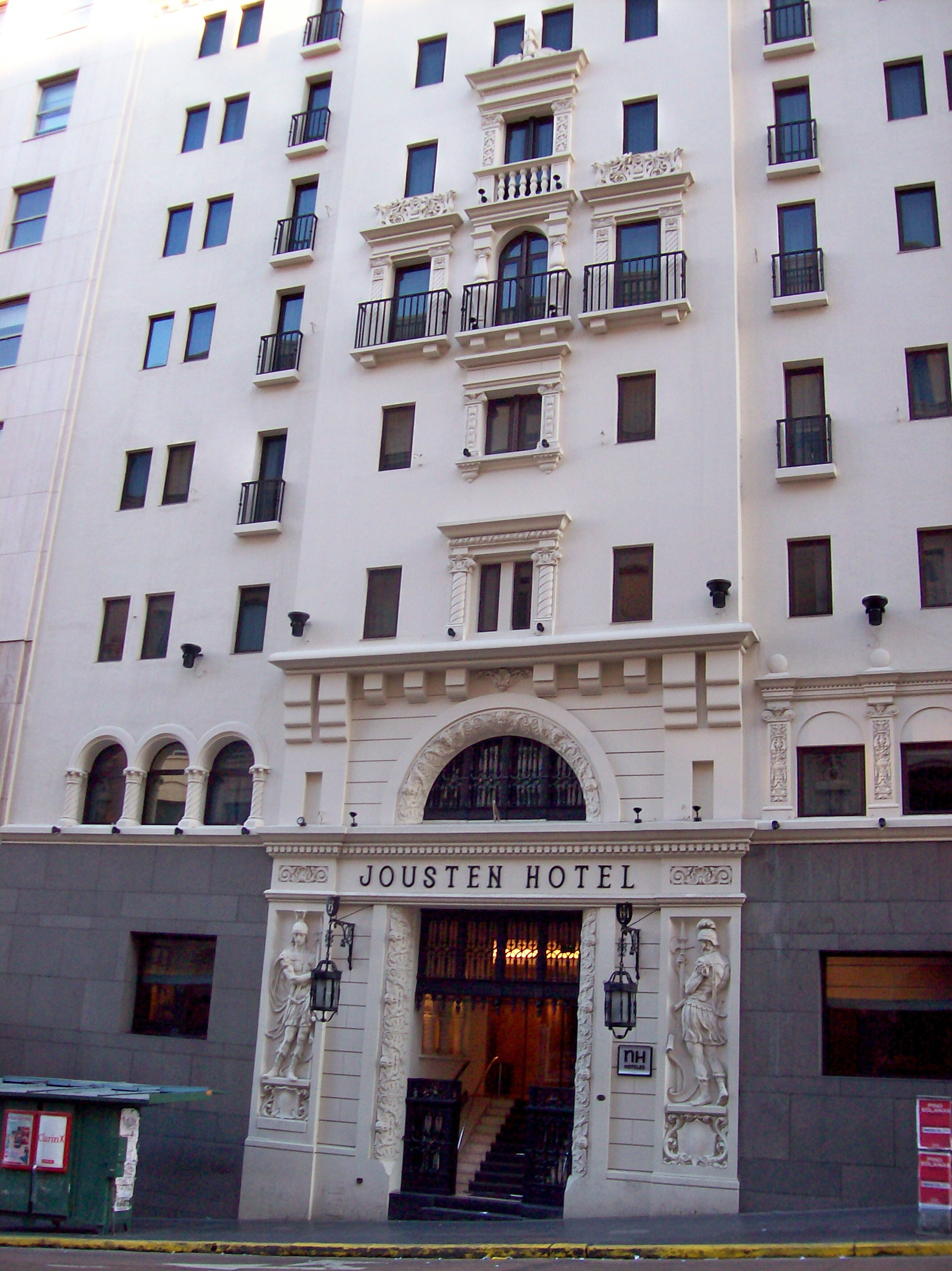
Jousten Hotel

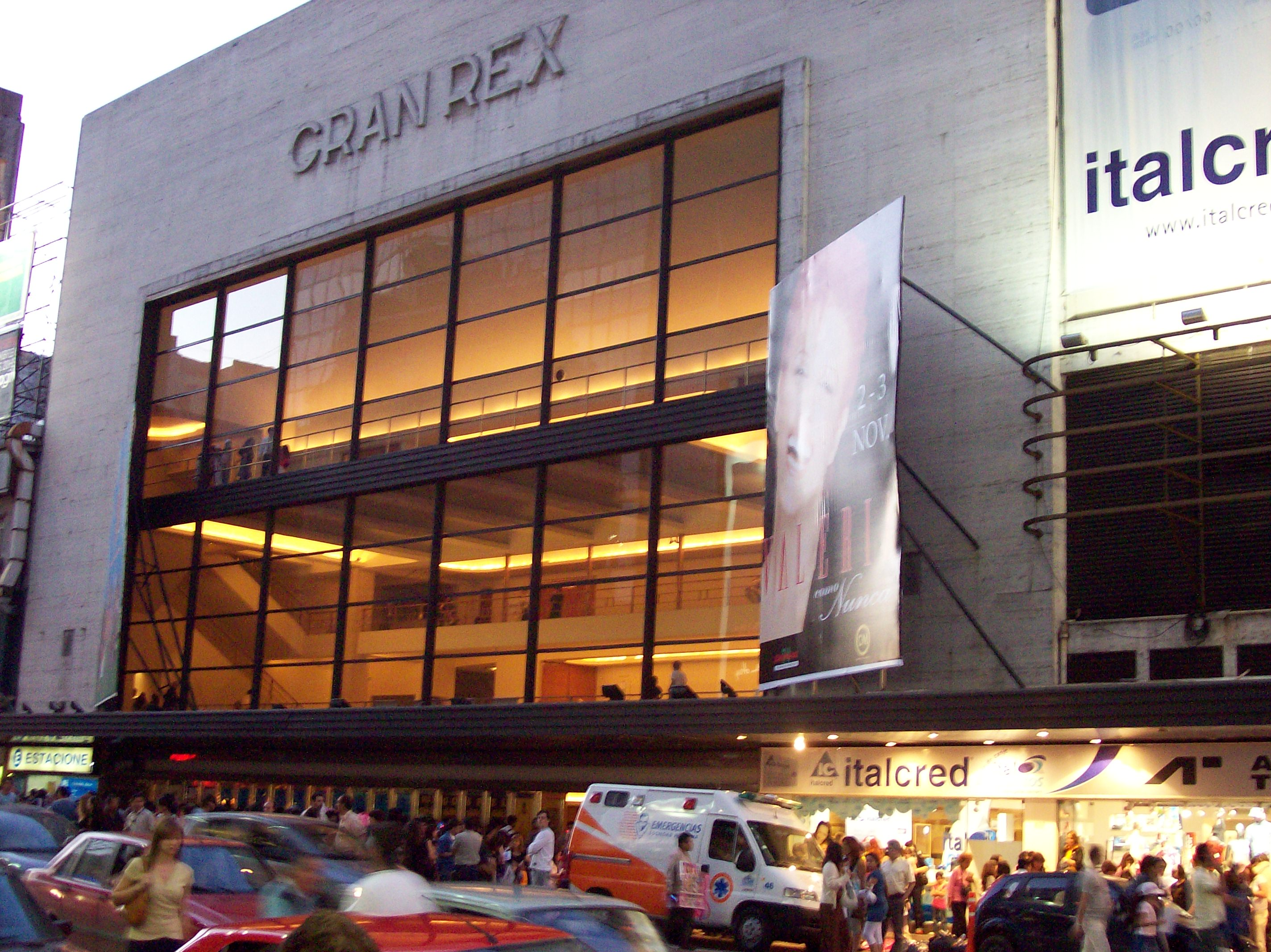
Gran Rex Theatre

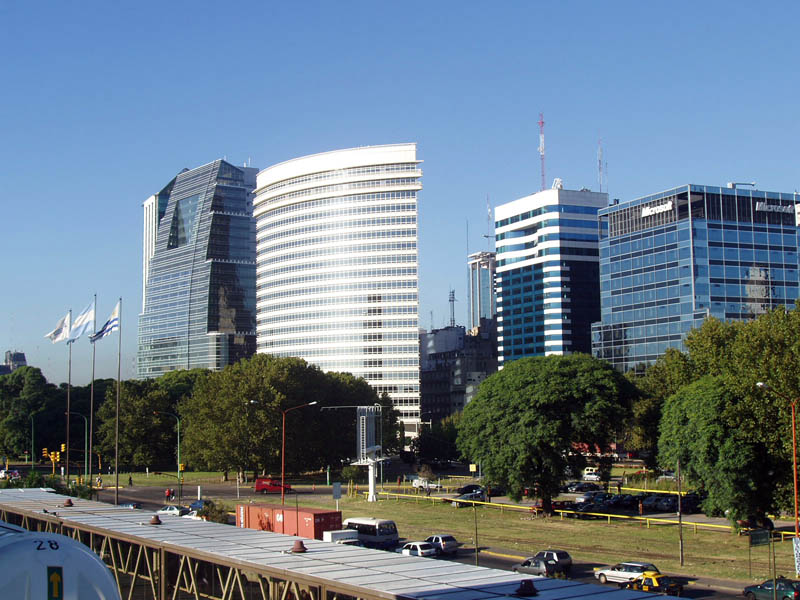
Office buildings along Eduardo Madero Avenue

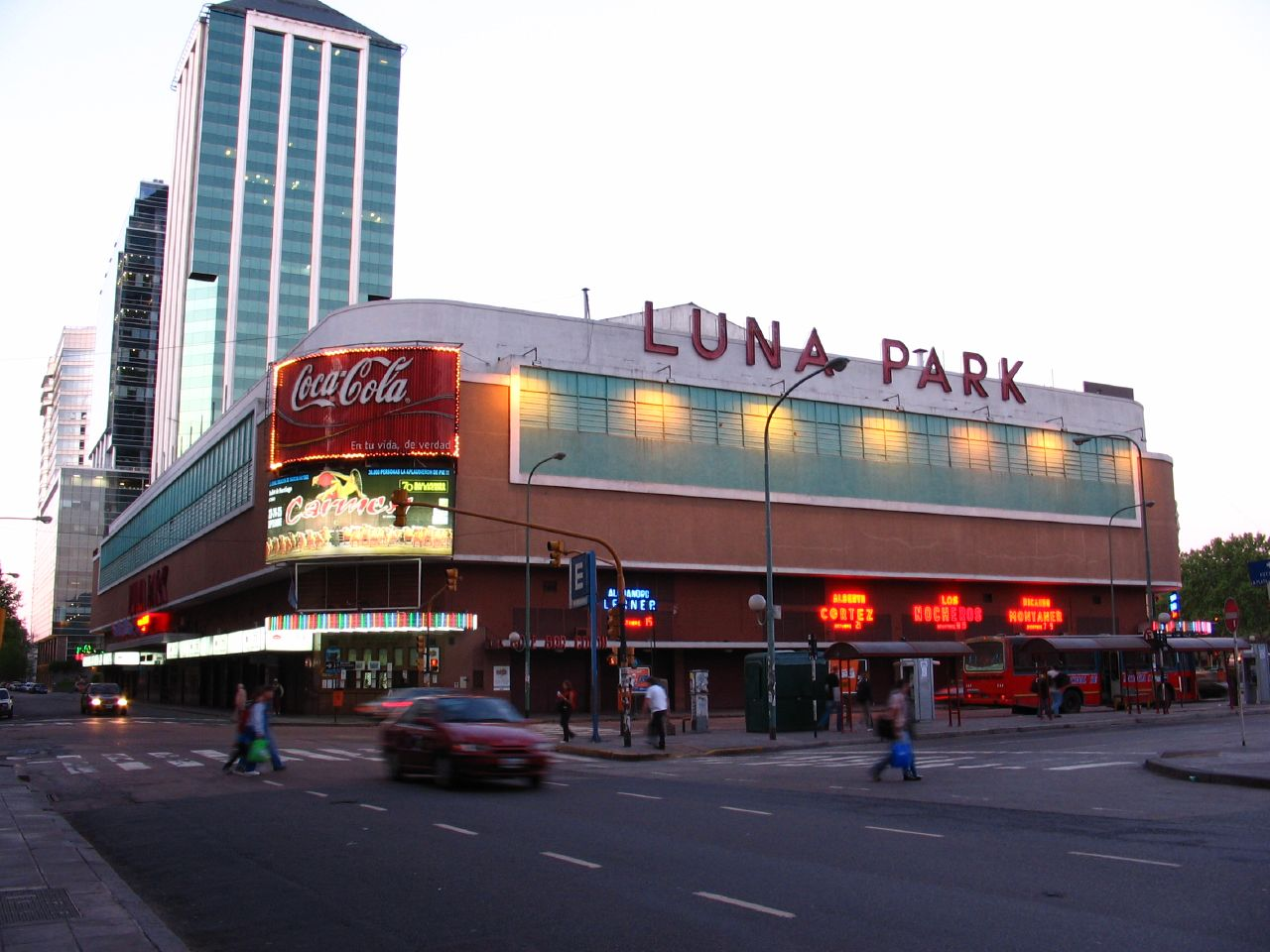
Luna Park stadium
