= Inversiones y Representaciones Sociedad Anónima =

Argentine holding company

Inversiones y Representaciones S.A. (IRSA)
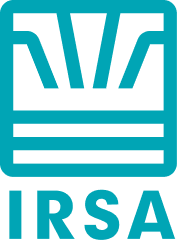
- Type: Public
- Traded as: NYSE: IRS; BCBA: IRSA; MERVAL component
- Industry: Real estate Hospitality
- Founded: June 23, 1943; 83 years ago
- Founder: Eduardo Elsztain
- Headquarters: Buenos Aires, Argentina
- Key people: Eduardo Elsztain (Chairman and CEO)
- Services: Shopping malls Office leasing Real estate development Hotels; Land rental
- Revenue: ▲US$ 381 million
- Total assets: ▲US$ 1.3 billion (6/2009)
- Parent: Cresud S.A.
- Website: irsa.com.ar

Inversiones y Representaciones Sociedad Anónima (mostly known for its acronym IRSA) is a corporation with Argentinian capital. It is 64% controlled by Cresud S.A.C.I.F. y A. and is engaged in the real estate business.

IRSA owns shopping centers and is responsible for overseeing several of the biggest real estate projects in the country. The current president of the company, in his capacity as well as through Cresud S.A., is Eduardo Elsztain.

== Overview ==
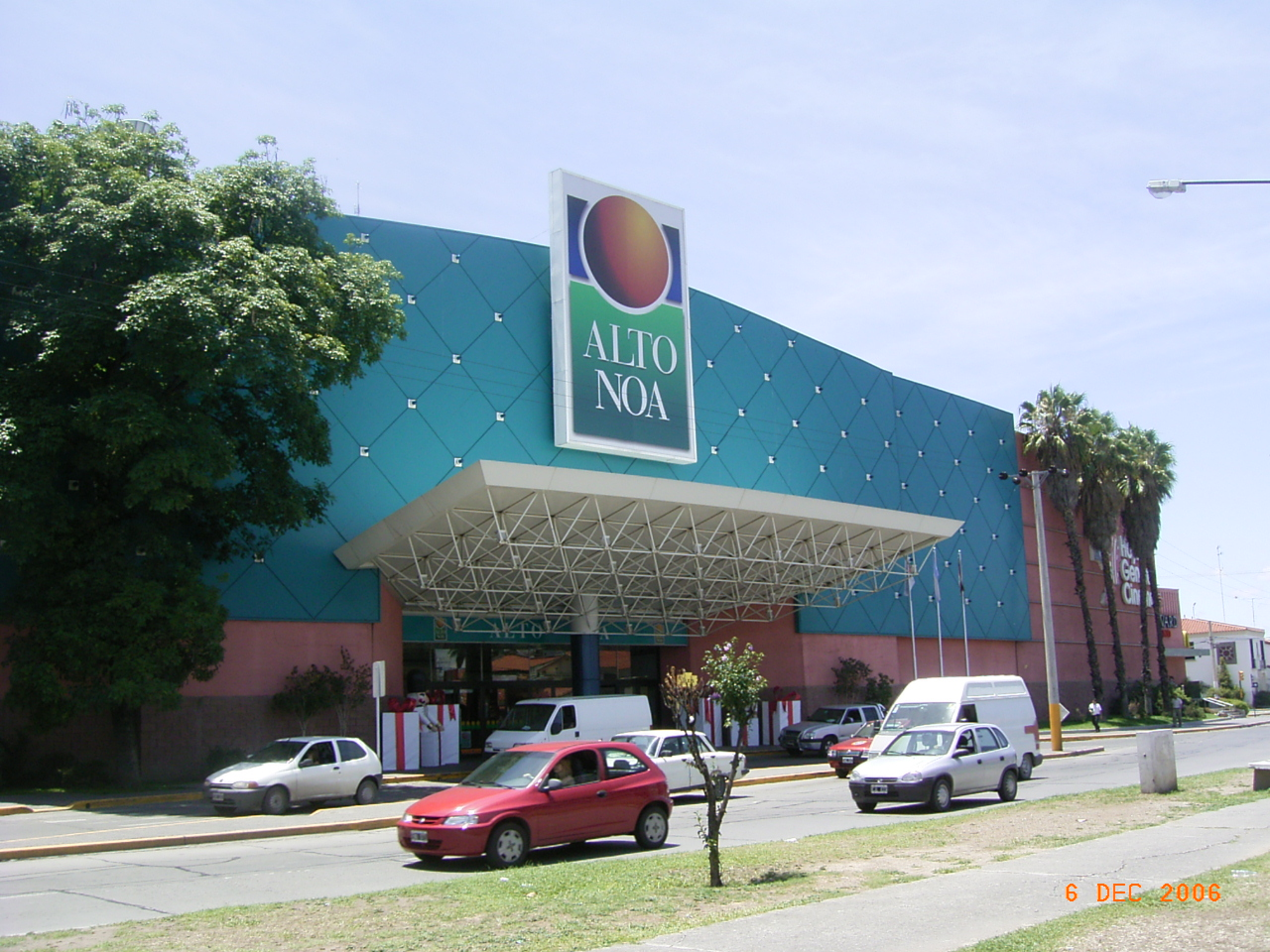
Alto NOA Shopping in Salta

IRSA was incorporated as a joint stock company on June 23, 1943. In the following decades, the company operated as a small, independent real estate company based in Buenos Aires, distinguished by low activity and small asset base.

In June 1991, Eduardo Elsztain acquired control of IRSA for an agreed consideration of US$120,000.

IRSA began its listing on the New York Stock Exchange (NYSE) through an initial public offering made on December 19, 1994, raising US$110 million.

By 2000, the Dolphin Fund had withdrawn from IRSA, reducing its available capital from US$300 million to approximately US$150 million. In 2002, IRSA sold its stake in a joint venture with a Brazilian group to meet its local financial obligations. The group recorded a net loss of 590 million pesos during the 2000–2002 period.

IRSA continued to expand into the mortgage lending sector, purchasing 28% of the formerly state owned Banco Hipotecario, and into the farming and ranching sectors, acquiring the local subsidiary of Amarillo, Texas-based Cactus Feeders in 2009,.

=== Shopping malls ===
From 1996, through its subsidiary company Alto Palermo S.A. (APSA), IRSA embarked on the acquisition of twelve shopping malls. The firm's APSA unit later purchased Buenos Aires Design, Galerías Pacífico, Patio Bullrich, Patio Olmos, and a number of other leading Argentine shopping centers, as well as important tourist assets such as the Llao Llao Hotel, a Bariloche mountain resort privatized in 1997. The following year, the firm redeveloped the historic Abasto de Buenos Aires, a landmark Art Deco former wholesale market. The firm, by then, also owned 13 of the most important commercial office buildings in Buenos Aires, enjoying occupancy rates of 97%, and some of the city's highest rents.

In 2009, IRSA acquired the lot where it developed Dot Baires Shopping in the Saavedra neighborhood of Buenos Aires, with an investment of US$160 million. In December 2013, it developed the Distrito Arcos shopping center.

In December 2024, the company returned to the acquisitions market, purchasing the Terrazas de Mayo shopping center from the Carrefour group for US$27.5 million.

In 2025, IRSA announced the opening of Distrito Diagonal, the first shopping center in the city of La Plata, with its opening scheduled for 2026, and the acquisition of Shopping Al Oeste, in Haedo, Morón Partido.

=== Real estate development ===
In 2007, IRSA formed a joint venture with Cyrela Brazil Realty to develop residential buildings in Argentina. The first joint project was Horizons, a six-tower residential complex in Vicente López with an investment of US$80 million, completed in 2010.

In May 2008, it purchased the Edificio República in Catalinas Norte, designed by Tucumán-born architect César Pelli.

In 1997, IRSA had acquired a roughly 70-hectare lot at the former Ciudad Deportiva de Boca Juniors, located on Buenos Aires's Costanera Sur. The project remained inactive for more than 20 years. In December 2021, the Buenos Aires City Legislature approved the zoning regulations for its development under the name Ramblas del Plata. The master plan allocates 29% of the total area (20.6 hectares) to private lots, with the remaining 71% (50.9 hectares) designated for public space.

The company resumed its purchases of office buildings during the recovery. Notable among these was Bouchard Plaza in 2007, which brought the number of such buildings in its portfolio to 17. It also purchased one of three remaining undeveloped lots in the Catalinas Norte office park in 2009.

In 2018, IRSA acquired a 60% stake in the DirecTV Arena through the company Ogden Argentina.

=== Other investments ===
IRSA also ventured into the agricultural sector by being purchased by Cresud S.A. in 1994. Cresud became a leading landowner of prime pampas agricultural land, controlling over a million hectares (2.5 million acres), as well as acquiring a significant stake in BrasilAgro.

== Group subsidiaries ==
=== Shopping centers ===
- Alto Palermo S.A. (APSA): engaged in the development, ownership, and management of shopping centers.
  - Abasto de Buenos Aires (Buenos Aires)
  - Alto Avellaneda (Avellaneda)
  - Alto NOA (Salta)
  - Alto Palermo (Buenos Aires)
  - Alto Rosario (Rosario)
  - Córdoba Shopping (Córdoba)
  - Dot Baires Shopping (Buenos Aires)
  - Mendoza Plaza Shopping (Mendoza)
  - Patio Bullrich (Buenos Aires)
  - Patio Olmos (Córdoba)
  - Soleil Premium Outlet (Boulogne)
  - La Ribera Shopping (Santa Fe)
  - Distrito Arcos (Buenos Aires)
  - Alto Comahue (Neuquén)
  - Terrazas de Mayo (Los Polvorines)

=== Hotels ===
- Hotel InterContinental Buenos Aires
- Llao Llao Hotel
- Libertador Hotel
- Edificio República
- Intercontinental Plaza

=== Other properties ===
- Live Arena (Tortuguitas)
- La Rural grounds
- Ramblas del Plata
