= Diana Cabeza =

Argentinean architect and urbanist

- Born: August 14, 1954; Buenos Aires, Argentina
- Died: May 22, 2024 (aged 69); Buenos Aires, Argentina
- Education: Escuela Nacional de Bellas Artes Prilidiano Pueyrredón; University of Belgrano
- Occupations: Architect, designer
- Known for: Urban design, street furniture
- Notable work: Yacaré bench Distrito Arcos; Metrobús signage and bus stops
- Spouse: Jorge Hampton
- Relatives: Elisabet Cabeza (sister)
- Awards: ICFF Editors Award (2003); Fondo Nacional de las Artes Achievement Award (2019)

Diana Cabeza (August 14, 1954 – May 22, 2024) was an Argentine architect and designer focusing on street furniture and other public architecture. Her designs are found in such cities as Tokyo, Zurich, Paris, and Buenos Aires.

== Biography ==
Diana Cabeza was born in Buenos Aires in 1954. She graduated from the Escuela Nacional de Bellas Artes Prilidiano Pueyrredón and the Department of Architecture and Urbanism at the University of Belgrano.

Cabeza went on to a career in urban design, focusing on public spaces, as leader of her own studio, Estudio Cabeza. She sought to enhance the social uses of these spaces and improve ergonomics. Her projects spanned several continents, from her native Buenos Aires to Tokyo, Zurich, Barcelona, Chicago, and Paris. Within Argentina, she worked on public spaces in such cities as Córdoba, Mendoza, Trelew, Rosario, Jujuy, and Pergamino. She was particularly well known for her bench designs, as well as for designing signage and bus stops for the Metrobús system.

Among various prizes, in 2003 she was recognized with an International Contemporary Furniture Fair Editors Award for her bench "Yacaré," inspired by the yacare caiman. In 2019, she received an achievement award from the Fondo Nacional de las Artes for her work as a designer.

Throughout her career, she frequently collaborated with her sister, Elisabet Cabeza. She was married to fellow architect Jorge Hampton, with whom she lived in Palermo.

Cabeza died in 2024, of cancer, at age 69. Later that year, the 19th Buenos Aires Architecture Bienniale honored her with the exhibition Redescubrí la ciudad (Rediscover the city).

== Selected projects ==
=== 2014 ===
- Distrito Arcos shopping center (Buenos Aires) - urban furniture and public-space design
- Toranomon Hills Plaza (Tokyo)

=== 2013 ===
- Metrobús – Avda. 9 de Julio line (Buenos Aires)
- Roppongi Hills Mori Tower Plaza (Tokyo)

=== 2012 ===
- Forum Puerto Norte (Rosario)
- Vatican Square Plaza (Buenos Aires)

=== 2011 ===
- YPF – Nordelta (Buenos Aires)
- Metrobús – Av. Juan B. Justo line (Buenos Aires)
- Alto Rosario Shopping (Rosario)

=== 1995 ===
- Puerto Madero revitalization (Buenos Aires)
