= Ramblas del Plata =

Mixed development in Buenos Aires, Argentina

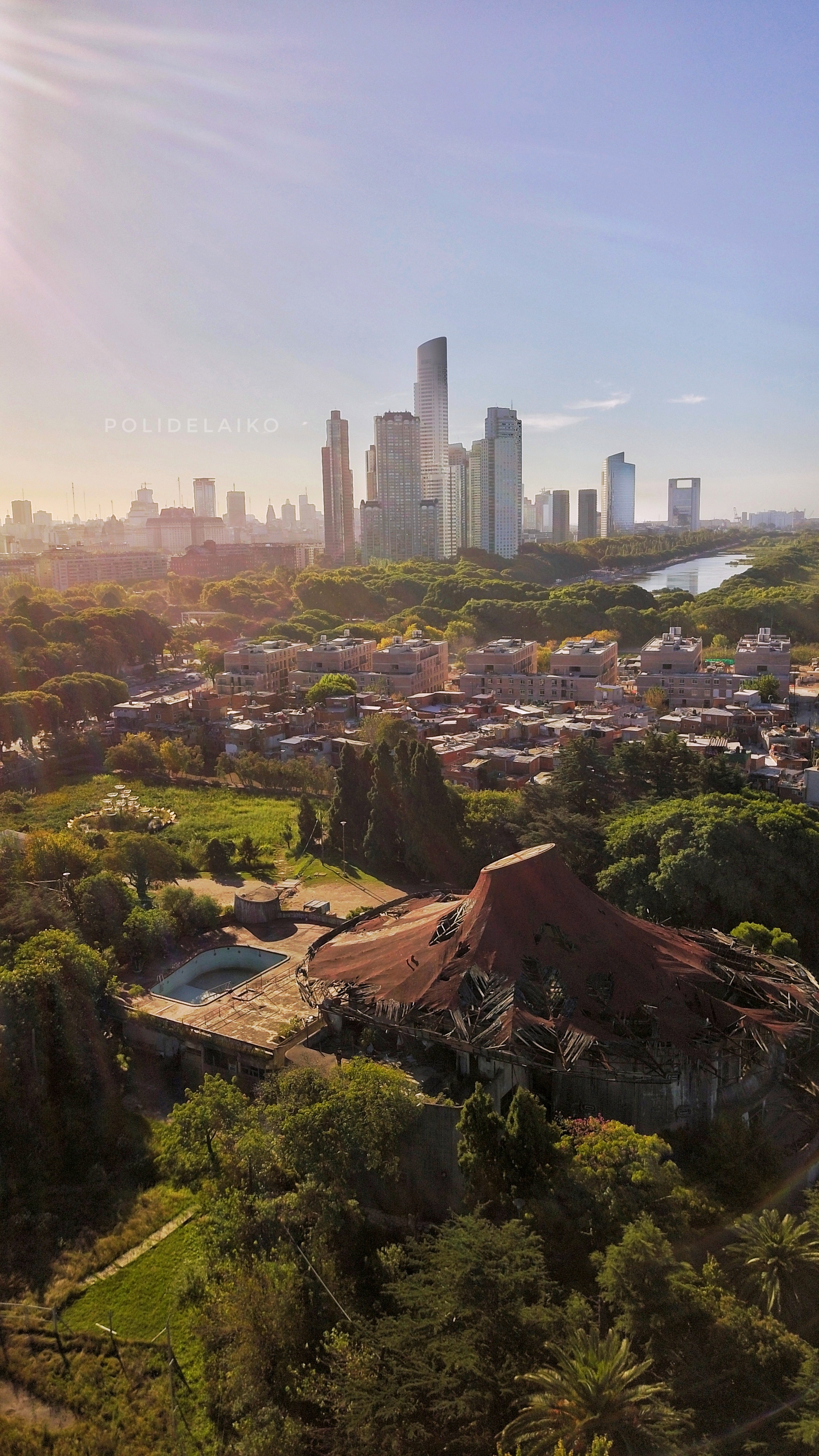
- View of the Costanera Sur sector where Ramblas del Plata is being developed

- Location in Buenos Aires
- Location: Buenos Aires, Argentina
- Coordinates: 34.6223°S 58.3484°W
- Developer: IRSA
- Owner: IRSA
- Architect: McCormack y Asociados
- Size: 71.6 ha (20.6 ha buildable)
- Website: www.irsa.com.ar

Ramblas del Plata is a mixed development project designed and intended for the southern Buenos Aires waterfront in Argentina, on the site of the former Boca Juniors Sports City.

The 71.6-hectare lot started as a reclaimed area in the Río de la Plata in the 1960s, originally intended as a stadium project that did not push through. For over three decades, the area changed hands and concepts several times until the Buenos Aires City Legislature approved a public-private partnership contract in 2021 between the Buenos Aires Government and IRSA.

After a judicial case that was settled in 2023, IRSA changed the project's name to Ramblas del Plata and started the construction work in 2025. The partnership agreement stipulated that 71% of the area will be used for a public park adjacent to the Costanera Sur Ecological Reserve, while 29% will be used for residential, office, and commercial purposes.

== History ==
=== Boca Juniors Sports City (1962-1991) ===
The land was transferred to Club Atlético Boca Juniors through National Law 16,575, passed on October 29, 1964. with the commitment to build a sports city that would include a stadium for 140,000 spectators,

The project was spearheaded by Alberto Armando, who began filling in the Río de la Plata on September 3, 1965, to create a series of artificial islands covering approximately 40 hectares.

The development included soccer fields, tennis courts, basketball courts, swimming pools, an amphitheater for 1,200 people, a café, a restaurant, a drive-in movie theater, and a stadium that would serve as the venue for the 1978 World Cup. The construction was to be financed through the sale of bonds and raffles, but successive economic crises, inflation, and management and administrative problems prevented it from coming to fruition. The project remained unfinished, and the club never managed to complete it.

In 1989, the National Congress passed Law 23,738, which deemed the original contract fulfilled despite the fact that the works had not been completed, and authorized Boca Juniors to sell the property.

=== Santa María del Plata (1991–1997) ===
In the early 1990s, the Santa María del Plata company acquired the land from Club Atlético Boca Juniors for $22 million.

In 1997, IRSA (Inversiones y Representaciones Sociedad Anónima) acquired the land and the master plan, forming the company Solares de Santa María S.A. for its development.

=== Development attempts (1997–2021) ===
For more than two decades, IRSA submitted multiple projects to develop the property under the name “Solares de Santa María,” none of which prospered due to lack of legislative approval or incompatibility with current zoning regulations:

- In 2010, IRSA signed an urban development agreement with the City Government that included the transfer of private land for public parks and $50 million for the development of the Rodrigo Bueno neighborhood and improvements to the Lamadrid settlement. The Legislature did not approve the project.
- In 2016, a new agreement was established whereby Solares de Santa María would cede 292,079 m^{2} for public use and $35 million for social urbanization. It was also not approved by the Buenos Aires Legislature.
- Successive bills were presented to the Legislature on several occasions (files 1647-J-2011, 2078-J-2011, 3283-J-2012, and 3738-J-2016) without being passed.

== Costa Urbana Project ==
=== Legislative approval (2021) ===
On July 19, 2021, the Government of the City of Buenos Aires, under the administration of Horacio Rodríguez Larreta, signed an urban development agreement with IRSA for the development of the project, renamed “Costa Urbana.” The agreement established the transfer of approximately 50.8 hectares (71% of the property) to the city government for the creation of a public park, while IRSA could develop buildings on the remaining 20.6 hectares (29% of the total), with a buildable area of approximately 895,000 m^{2}.

The bill underwent a two-reading process in the Buenos Aires Legislature. On August 19, 2021, the first reading was approved. The Legislature approved the agreement by a majority vote in the second reading on December 2, 2021.

Law 6476 was published in the Official Gazette of the City of Buenos Aires on December 22, 2021. The law modified the zoning of the property (designated “U73 - Public Park and Costa Urbana Development”).

=== Legal dispute (2022–2023) ===
On March 10, 2022, Judge Aurelio Luis Ammirato of the 10th Contentious, Administrative, and Tax Court of the City of Buenos Aires declared the urban development agreement null and void in the context of an injunction filed by the Observatory of the Right to the city.

The Government of the City of Buenos Aires and IRSA appealed the ruling. On March 6, 2023, Chamber IV of the city's Administrative and Tax Appeals Court, composed of Judges María de las Nieves Macchiavelli Agrelo and Laura Alejandra Perugini, overturned the lower court's ruling.

The judges considered that the legally relevant step had been the legislative approval with its corresponding public hearing.

=== Architecture competition for the public park ===
In December 2022, the Secretariat for Urban Development of the City Government launched the “Buenos Aires and the River - Costa Urbana Public Park National Ideas Competition.” The ideas competition was carried out in cooperation with the Central Society of Architects, with the Argentine Federation of Architectural Entities as sponsor.

On March 15, 2023, the jury announced the winner as the “BA Rioparque” project, presented by the PALO arq studio in collaboration with WEST 8.

=== Ramblas del Plata ===
Following the favorable court ruling in 2023, IRSA renamed the project “Ramblas del Plata” and commissioned McCormack y Asociados to draw up the general master plan.

The master plan consists of a buildable area of 126,000 m^{2} divided between residential towers, office blocks, and commercial areas, with building footprints up to six stories in height. The development also comprises a 1.4 km coastal promenade, which connects the development to the adjacent Puerto Madero area. At the end of 2024, IRSA began actively marketing lots through a mixed system of direct sales and barter transactions.

By June 2026, IRSA had sold 18 lots in the project's first stage, raising more than US$100 million. On June 26, 2026, the company reported to the National Securities Commission a barter agreement for a 6,947 m^{2} lot, with an estimated sellable area of 17,500 m^{2} and a transaction value of approximately US$14.175 million. Total estimated investment for the full project is US$1.8 billion.
