= Dot Baires Shopping =

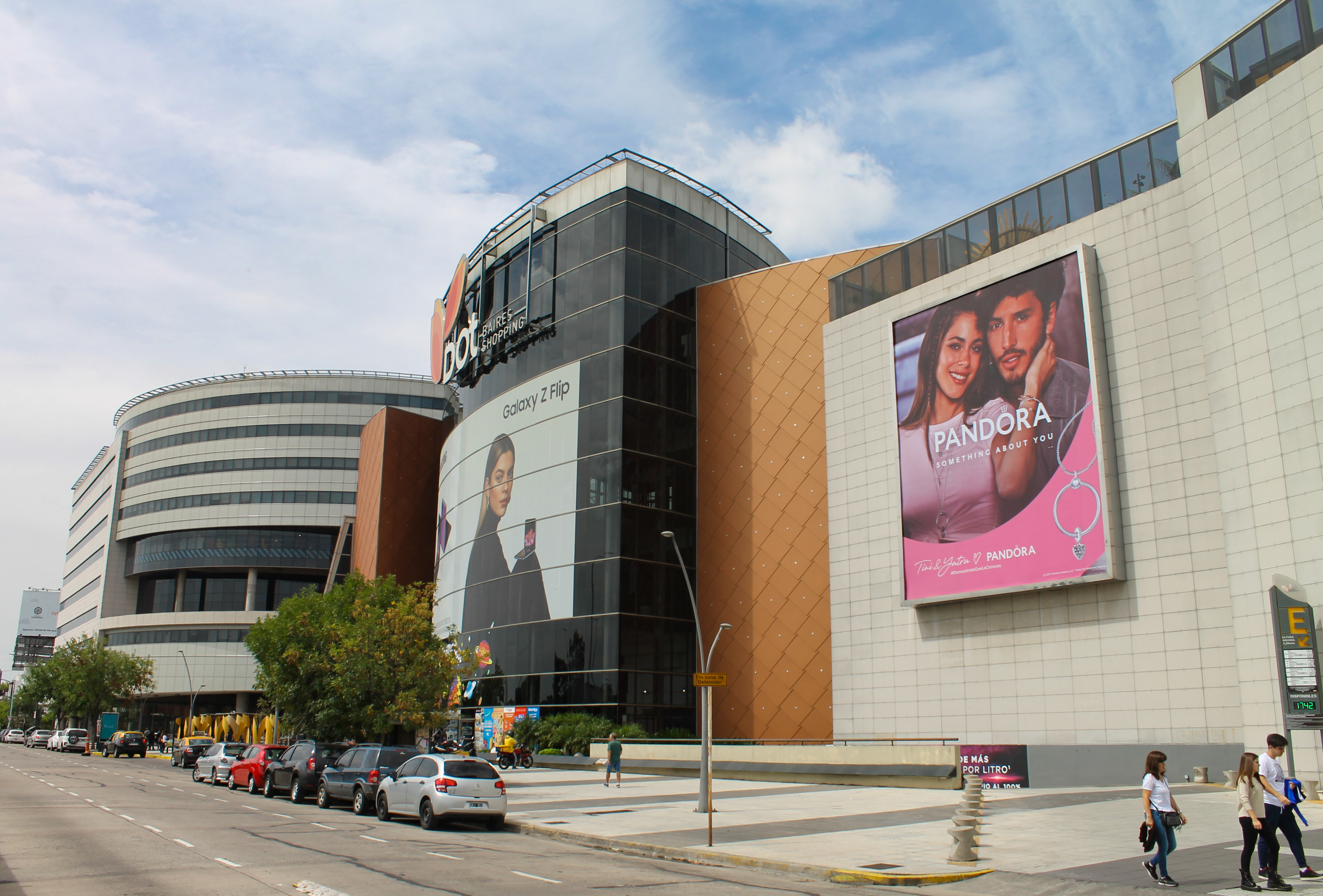
- Main facade on Vedia street
- Address: Vedia 3600, Buenos Aires
- Opened: May 12, 2009; 17 years ago
- Owner: IRSA
- Architect: Pfeifer-Zurdo
- Floor area: 173,000 m²
- Floors: 4 (plus 3 underground floors)
- Parking: Yes (30,328 m²)
- Website: dotbairesshopping.com

Dot Baires Shopping is a shopping center located in the Saavedra neighborhood of the city of Buenos Aires, Argentina, founded in 2009 incorporating an office building into the complex, plus architecture with a dynamic, highly visible front and a landscaped atrium on Avenida General Paz.

The shopping center belongs to local holding IRSA and was built at a cost of US$160 million. It was designed by the Pfeifer-Zurdo (PfZ) studio. Shopping Dot has three floors for commercial stores and three underground floors (for parking purposes) covering a total of 173,000 m^{2}. It has a total of 155 commercial stores.

The complex was officially inaugurated in May 2009 at a ceremony led by Eduardo Elsztain, president of IRSA; the project required an estimated investment of 160 million dollars.

== Overview ==
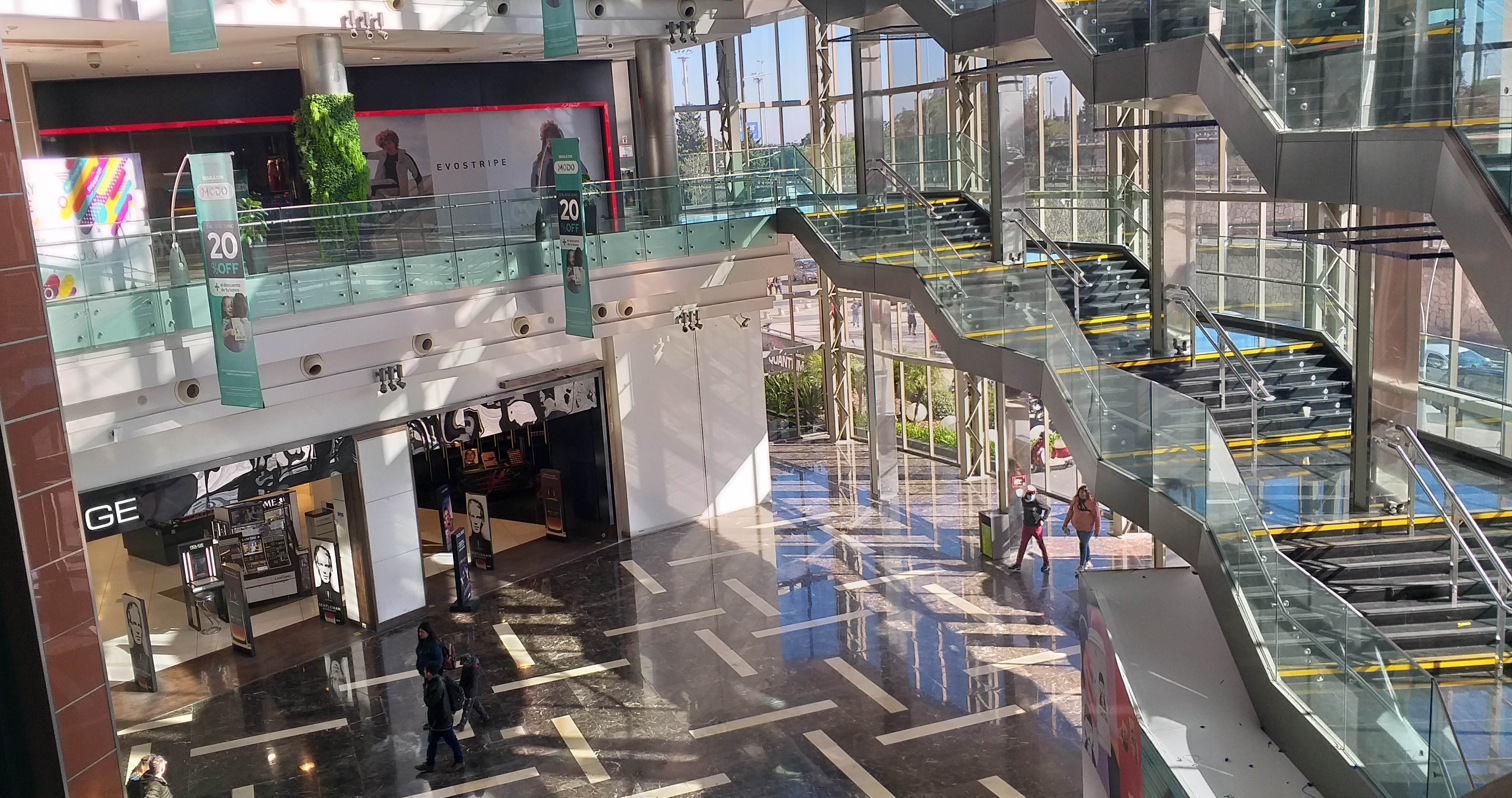
Interior of the shopping in July 2022

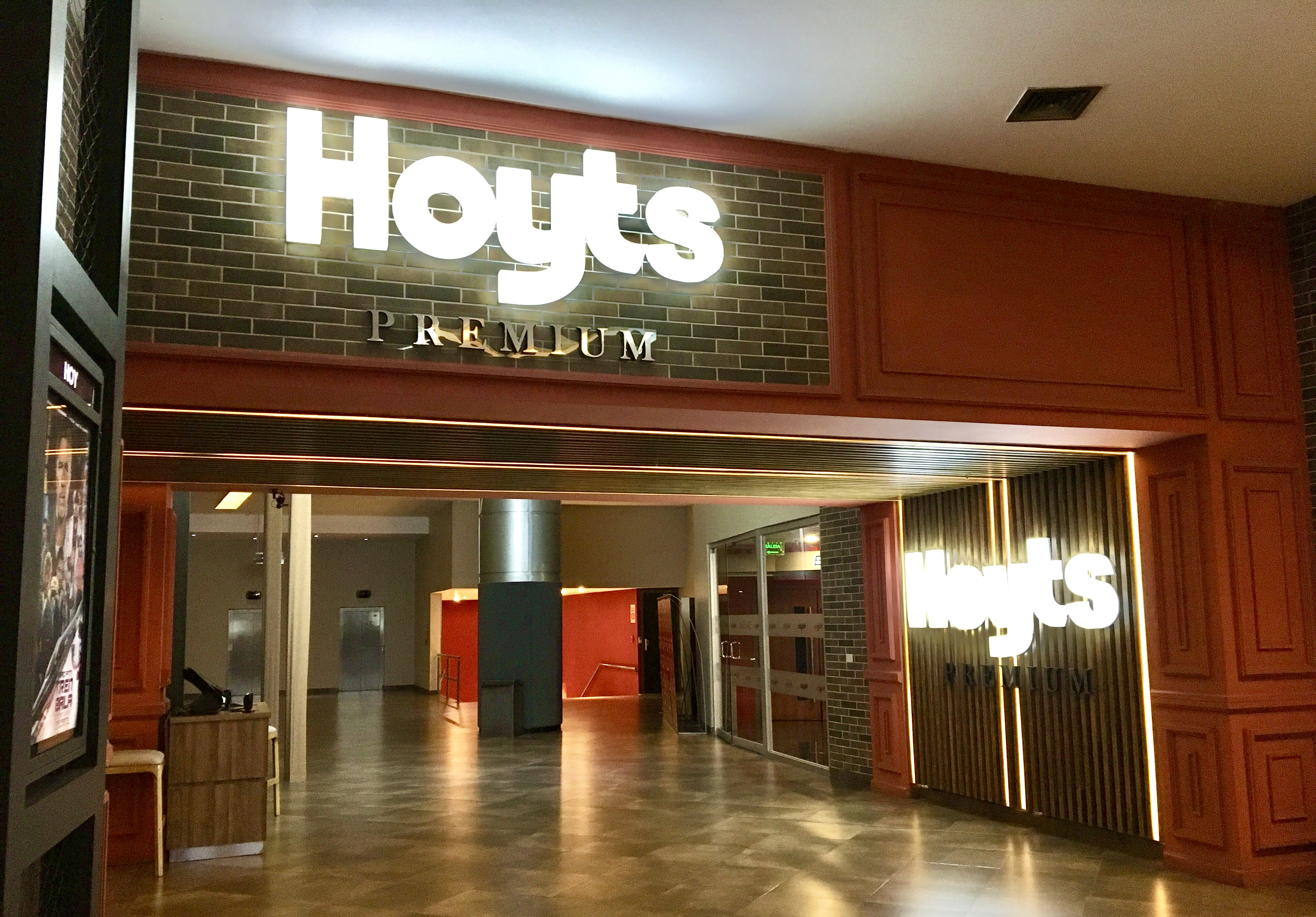
Hoyts cinemas at Dot Baires

Apart from the commercial stores, Dot Baires shopping has 10 movie theaters of Hoyts chain, occupying a surface area of 6,500 m^{2} and with a total of 2,500 seats.

The mall has an eight-story office building connected to it in which companies such as HP and Flybondi have their corporate offices. Additionally, it has a second building inaugurated in April 2019 called Polo Dot, where Mercado Libre has its corporate offices.

When some foreign companies ceased operations in Argentina due to the financial crisis caused by the COVID-19 pandemic (such as Chilean Falabella and American Walmart), IRSA invested US$6 million to refurbish the Dot Baires, adding services stores including a medical center, a gym, a pharmacy chain, a premium food market and even five-a-side football pitches.

== Area characteristics ==
The shopping center is located within the Saavedra neighborhood, on the border with the locality of Florida, in the Vicente López partido.

On December 6, 2012, during a period of heavy rainfall and flooding in the city of Buenos Aires, a group of local residents entered the Dot Baires shopping center as a sign of protest. According to the newspaper La Nación, those involved were residents of Barrio Mitre, who attributed the flooding to the construction of the shopping center.Dot Baires stated that "at the time of its inauguration, it carried out a major stormwater drainage project at the request of the Government of the City of Buenos Aires. On days when more than 100 mm of rain falls within an hour, the stormwater system becomes overwhelmed, as occurs in other parts of the city." In February 2014, DOT opened a reservoir with a capacity of 11,000 m³ of water to prevent further flooding. The reservoir is part of the Medrano basin, which runs underground beneath the surrounding area.

== Trademark dispute ==
In 2009, fashion designer Laurencio Adot disputed the use of the Dot name, claiming prior trademark registration dating from 2006. Adot had registered the brand for a boutique on Avenida Alvear in Recoleta, Buenos Aires. He had also used the Dot name for his fashion shows. IRSA had formally applied to register the Dot trademark before the Instituto Nacional de la Propiedad Industrial (INPI), the Argentine intellectual property authority, following the legally established procedure. Adot himself acknowledged that the two brands operated in entirely different market segments. The shopping center retained its name following the dispute.
