= Patio Bullrich =

Shopping center in Buenos Aires

Coordinates: 34°35′19″S 58°23′02″W

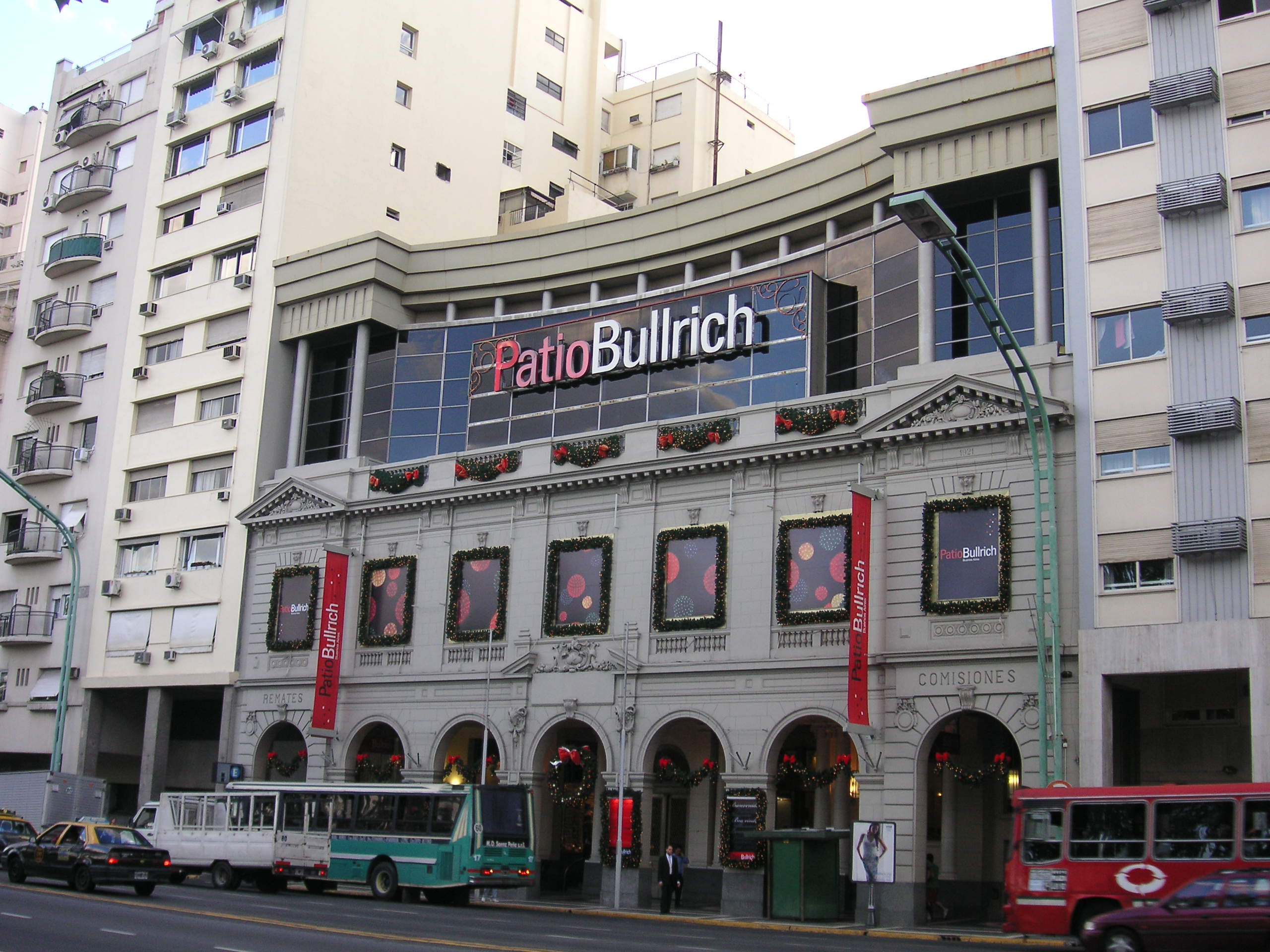
- Main facade on Avenida del Libertador
- Address: Posadas 1245, Buenos Aires
- Opened: September 15, 1988; 38 years ago`
- Owner: IRSA
- Architect: Juan Waldorp (original building); Juan Carlos López y Asociados (renovation)
- Num. of stores: 88
- Floor area: 28,982.61 m² (11,783 m² gross leasable area)
- Floors: 6 (plus 2 underground floors)
- Parking: Yes (for 217 vehicles)
- Website: patiobullrich.com.ar

Patio Bullrich is a shopping center located in the Retiro neighborhood of Buenos Aires, Argentina. The building was originally an auction house owned by the Bullrich family, where cattle and pieces of art were auctioned. The then-disused house was refurbished by Grupo IRSA, preserving its original architecture and elements. Under the name "Patio Bullrich", the mall was inaugurated in August 1988.

== Overview ==
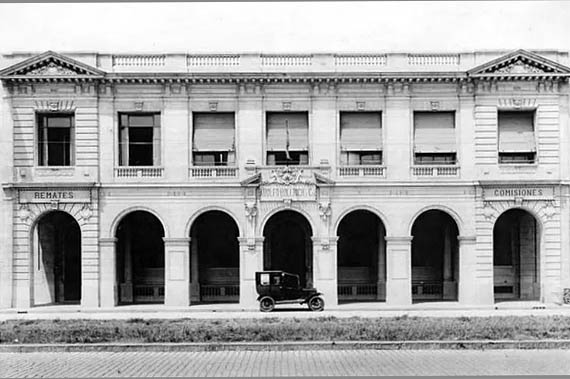
The original auction house "Casa Bullrich"

Designed by English Argentine architect Juan Waldorp, Patio Bullrich was originally built as an auction house in 1867 for the prominent local Bullrich family. The auction house was long one of the city's premier sales floors for livestock, particularly prize bulls, and thoroughbreds, as well as serving as a consignment house for a variety of valuable heirlooms and other collectible items.

The upscale area's rising real estate values prompted the Bullrich family to sell the acre-size Avenida del Libertador lot to Alto Palermo, S.A., a leading local commercial real estate developer during the mid-1980s. Alto Palermo commissioned Pfeifer & Zurdo Architects to convert the building into a shopping center. Designing a six-story arcade they maintained some of the original aspects of Waldorp's design, including a massive clock tower numerous marble animal head wall sculptures and the neoclassical façade.

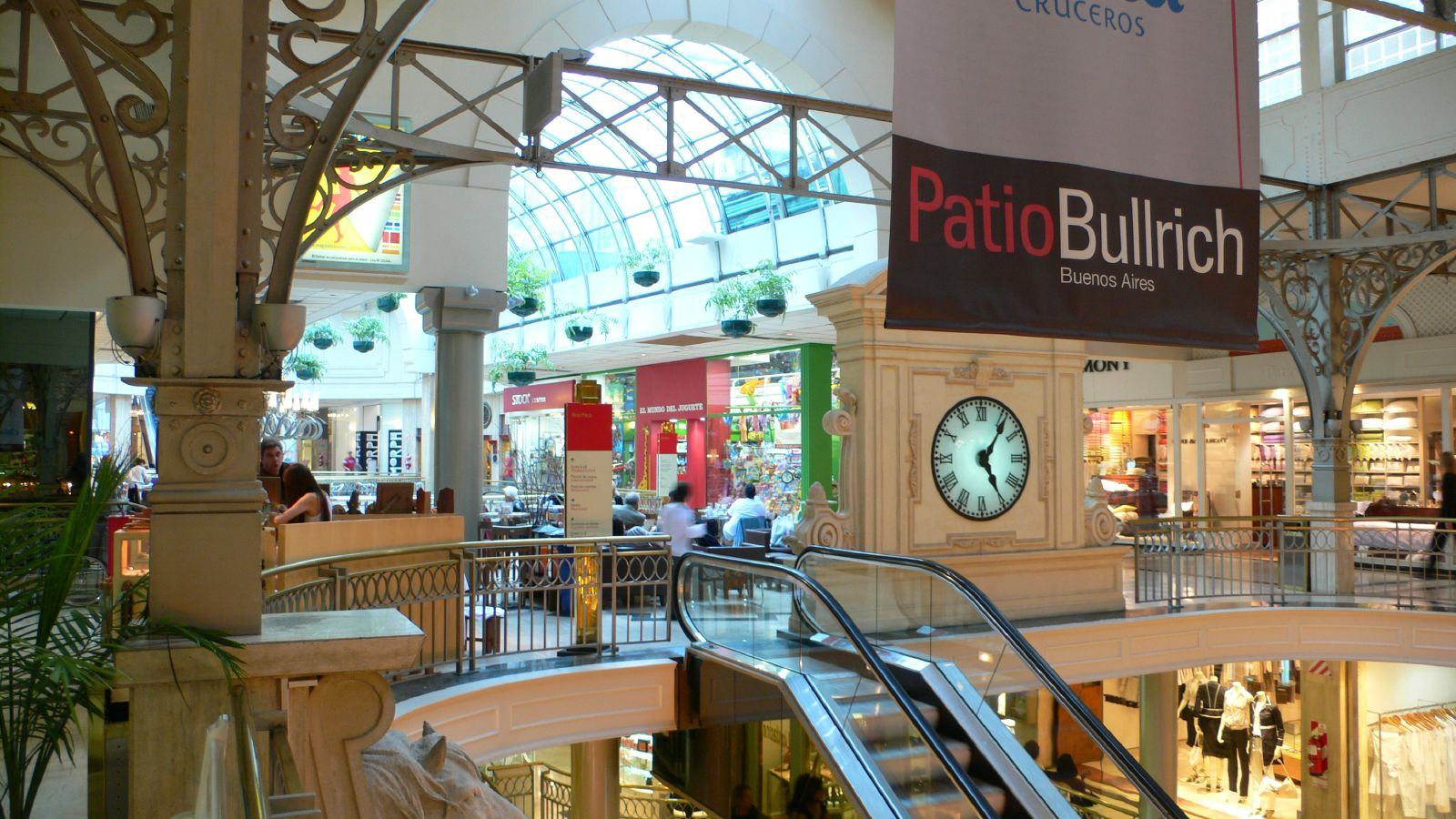
View of the interior and the former auction house clock

Inaugurated in August 1988, Patio Bullrich was the first of a series of new upscale shopping galleries opened in subsequent years to replace aging favorites, and pre-dated Galerías Pacífico, the better-known shopping center likewise built in a historic building, by three years. Modernized and expanded in 1995, Patio Bullrich used to house numerous international luxury brands, including Carolina Herrera, Christian Dior, Christian Lacroix and Tiffany & Co. There was also a stagecraft gift shop run by the Colón Theatre Foundation and four cinemas. However, many luxury brands have been forced to abandon the Argentine market due to government's import restrictions.

In July 1998, it was acquired by Eduardo Elsztain's IRSA Group.

Italian luxury fashion house Ermenegildo Zegna reopened a store in Patio Bullrich in 2017. Swiss company Bally plans to establish a shop through local partnership. In 2018, Louis Vuitton announced that the company would return to Buenos Aires with a pop-up store in Patio Bullrich after exiting Argentina in 2012. Patio Bullrich annually organizes Colecciones by Patio, a fashion show featuring international luxury brands.
