= Abasto de Buenos Aires =

Abasto Shopping
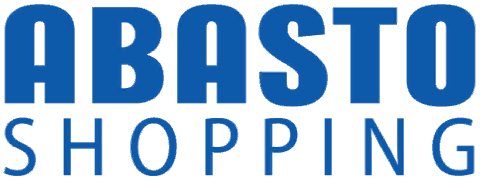

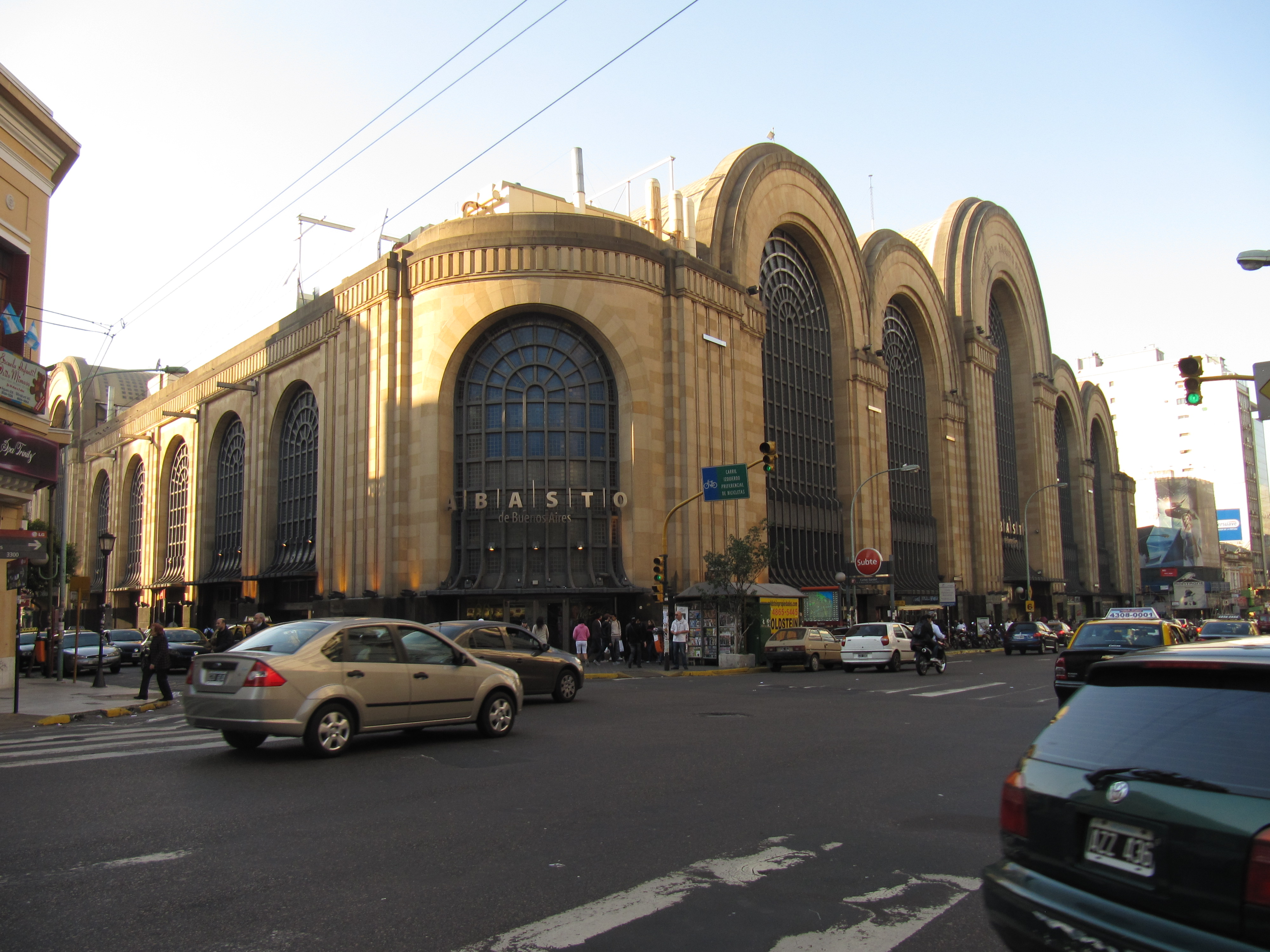
- View of Abasto in 2011.
- Location: Buenos Aires, Argentina
- Coordinates: 34°36′13″S 58°24′39″W
- Address: Av. Corrientes 3247
- Opened: 9 November 1998; 27 years ago
- Owner: IRSA
- Num. of stores: 174
- Floor area: 116,646 m^{2} (1,255,570 sq ft)
- Floors: 4
- Parking: 1,200 vehicles

The Abasto Shopping is one of the largest shopping malls in Buenos Aires, Argentina, and a landmark example of Art Deco architecture in Latin America.

The building served as the city's central wholesale fruit and vegetable market (Mercado de Abasto) from 1893 to 1984. Designed by architects José Luis Delpini, Viktor Sulčič, and Raúl Bes—the same team responsible for La Bombonera stadium—the current Art Deco structure was completed in 1934 and represents a pioneering use of reinforced concrete in Argentine architecture.

After the market closed in 1984, the building remained abandoned for over a decade before being purchased in 1996 by IRSA, the real estate company led by Eduardo Elsztain.IRSA restored the building's historic façade while converting it into a modern shopping center, which opened in November 1998.

The area surrounding the Abasto has deep cultural significance in tango history, particularly as the neighborhood where legendary singer Carlos Gardel—known as El Morocho del Abasto ("the dark-haired guy from Abasto")—lived from 1927 to 1933. Today, the surrounding area, though officially part of the Balvanera neighbourhood, is commonly referred to as Abasto. The shopping center is served by the adjoining Line B metro station Carlos Gardel.

== History ==
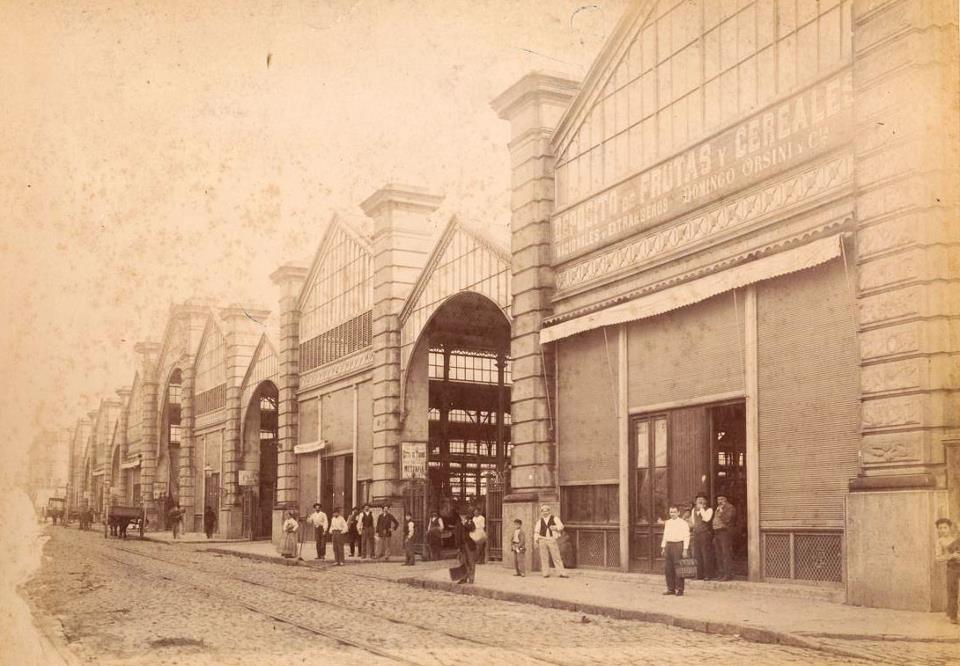
The original Mercado de Abasto c. 1890s

=== Early market (1888–1934) ===
By the end of the 19th century, the city of Buenos Aires was expanding rapidly due to the influx of migrants from various European countries. Because of the demographic change, and the demolition of the Mercado Modelo market near the Plaza Lorea, the Devoto brothers on August 16, 1888, proposed the construction of a supply market on the land they acquired in 1875 in the Balvanera neighbourhood. The land was near the Sarmiento railway and halfway between La Boca and Olivos, two zones of fruit and vegetable production.

The town hall accepted the proposal on November 29 of that year, and passed it on to the Deliberating Council, who sanctioned it on January 8, 1889, in an ordinance approving the construction of the Mercado Central de Abasto ("Central Supply Market") on the 25,000 m² plot of land between Corrientes Avenue, Lavalle, Anchorena and Laprida streets. The municipality allowed the Abasto market to become wholesalers of fruit, vegetables and other foodstuffs, but forbade the sale of meat.

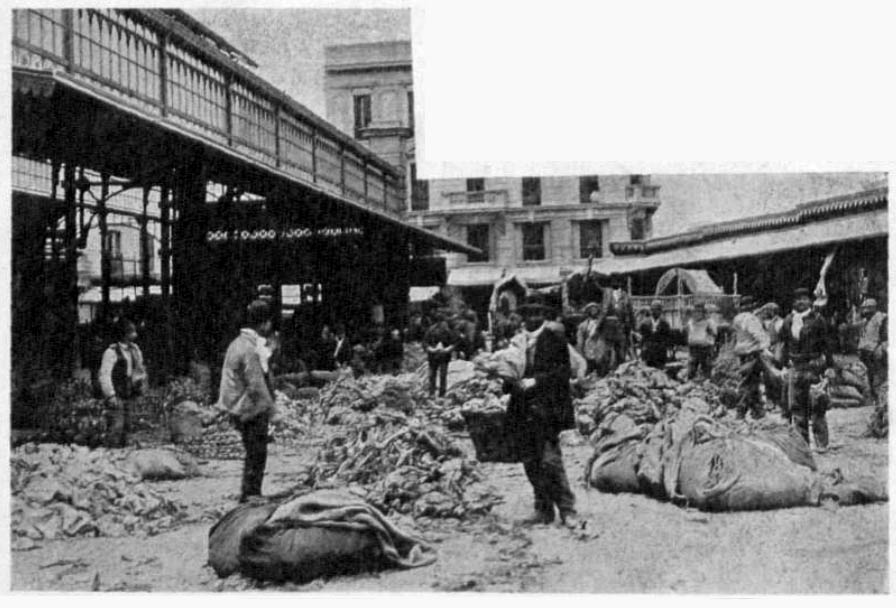
People at the market in 1898

The old marketeers of the Mercado Modelo associated and founded in 1889 the Sociedad Anónima Mercado de Abasto Proveedor ("Market Supply Provider Anonymous Society"), which bought from the Devoto brothers the land and the concession to build the Mercado de Abasto. The construction of the building started shortly after the sale had been approved by mayor Francisco Seeber, and the first section was inaugurated on April 1 of 1893, with a covered area of 1,300 m².

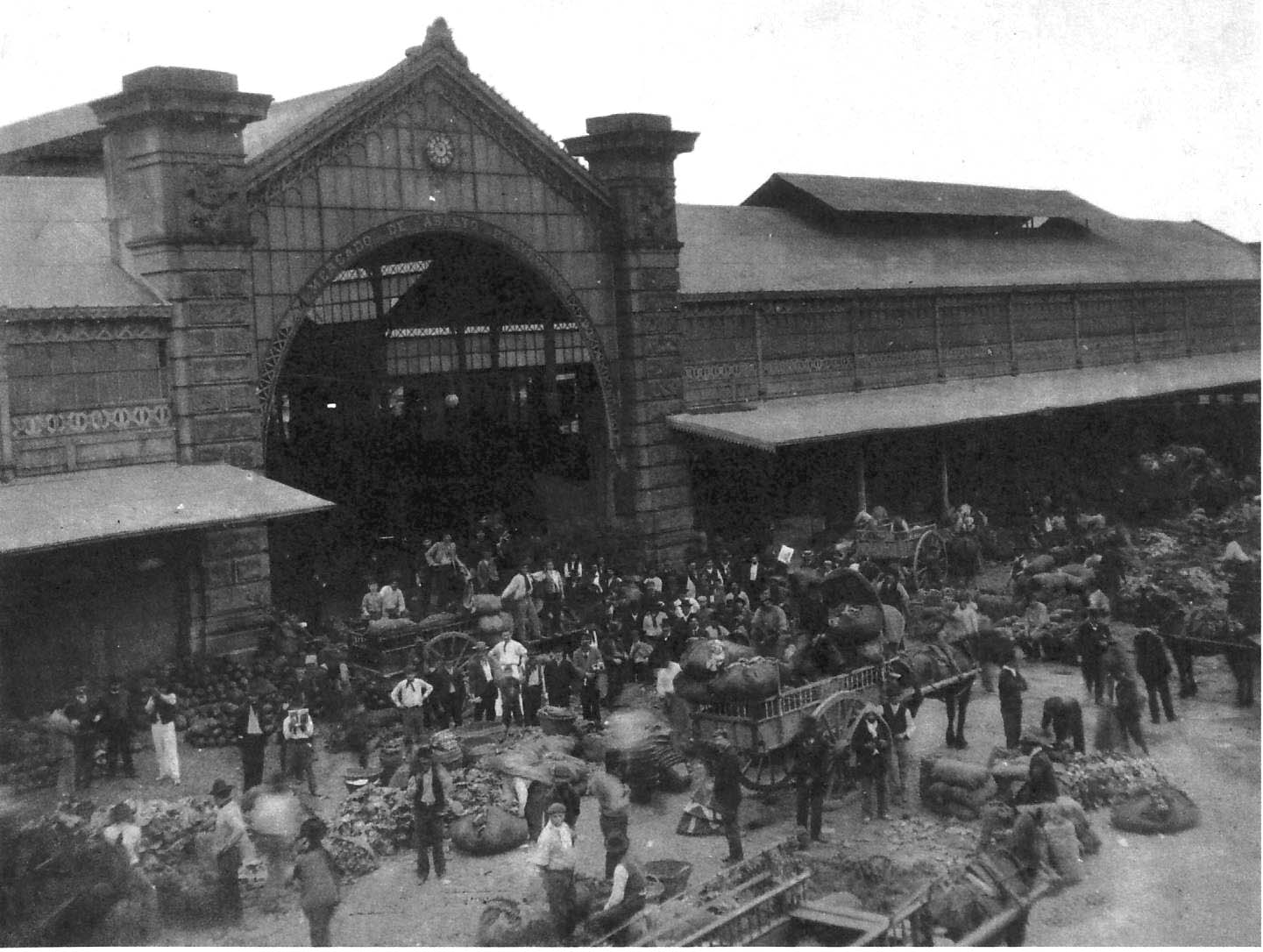
A populated market as seen in 1925

Ten years later a refrigerated storage and an ice factory were opened, to satisfy the city's hygiene standards of the times. Since the population, and with it consumer demand, was steadily growing, it was necessary to construct a parking area for horses and vehicles. In 1928 an annex for retail sale was built between Guardia Vieja, Lavalle, Gallo and Bustamante streets.

=== New building (1931–1984) ===
Consumer demand again led to the overcrowding of the markets of the city, so architects José Luis Delpini, Viktor Sulčič and Raúl Bes designed a new market in the location of the Abasto market. Work started on December 28 of 1931 with the foundations and finished in 1934. The new Mercado de Abasto had an area of 44,000 m^{2} (473,612 sq ft), railway access and underground parking. In 1939, the sale of meat and fish was allowed.

On November 27, 1952, a fire broke out in the building's basement that lasted several days. To protect the structure, architect José Luis Delpini rebuilt the damaged sections and reinforced the building. It was discovered that a tunnel connecting to subway Line B had fueled the flames through a "chimney effect," prompting officials to seal the passage between the subway tracks and the building's basement with a masonry wall.

In 1955, the market was featured in the Argentine film Mercado de Abasto, starring Pepe Arias and Tita Merello, which showcased the market's daily operations and its central role in Buenos Aires life.

On October 14, 1984, the central market was moved to the present Mercado Central location, outside the city of Buenos Aires, and the Abasto of Buenos Aires was closed and left abandoned.

=== Conversion to shopping mall (1990s–present) ===
It was not until the mid-1990s that a project was proposed for turning the Abasto into a shopping mall. In 1994, IRSA, under the leadership of Eduardo Elsztain, began development of a shopping center in the then-neglected Abasto neighborhood. In 1996 the building was sold to Inversiones y Representaciones Sociedad Anónima (IRSA), which restored the facade and remodeled and restored its interior. The restoration work began in January 1997 and was completed with the shopping center's inauguration on 9 November 1998, in a ceremony attended by then-President Carlos Menem and Buenos Aires Mayor Fernando de la Rúa.

Abasto Shopping Centre was opened in 1998, and currently houses many locally known brands like Akiabara, Cuesta Blanca, and Ricky Sarkany. A limited number of foreign brands can also be found such as Adidas, Lacoste and Nike

== Gallery ==
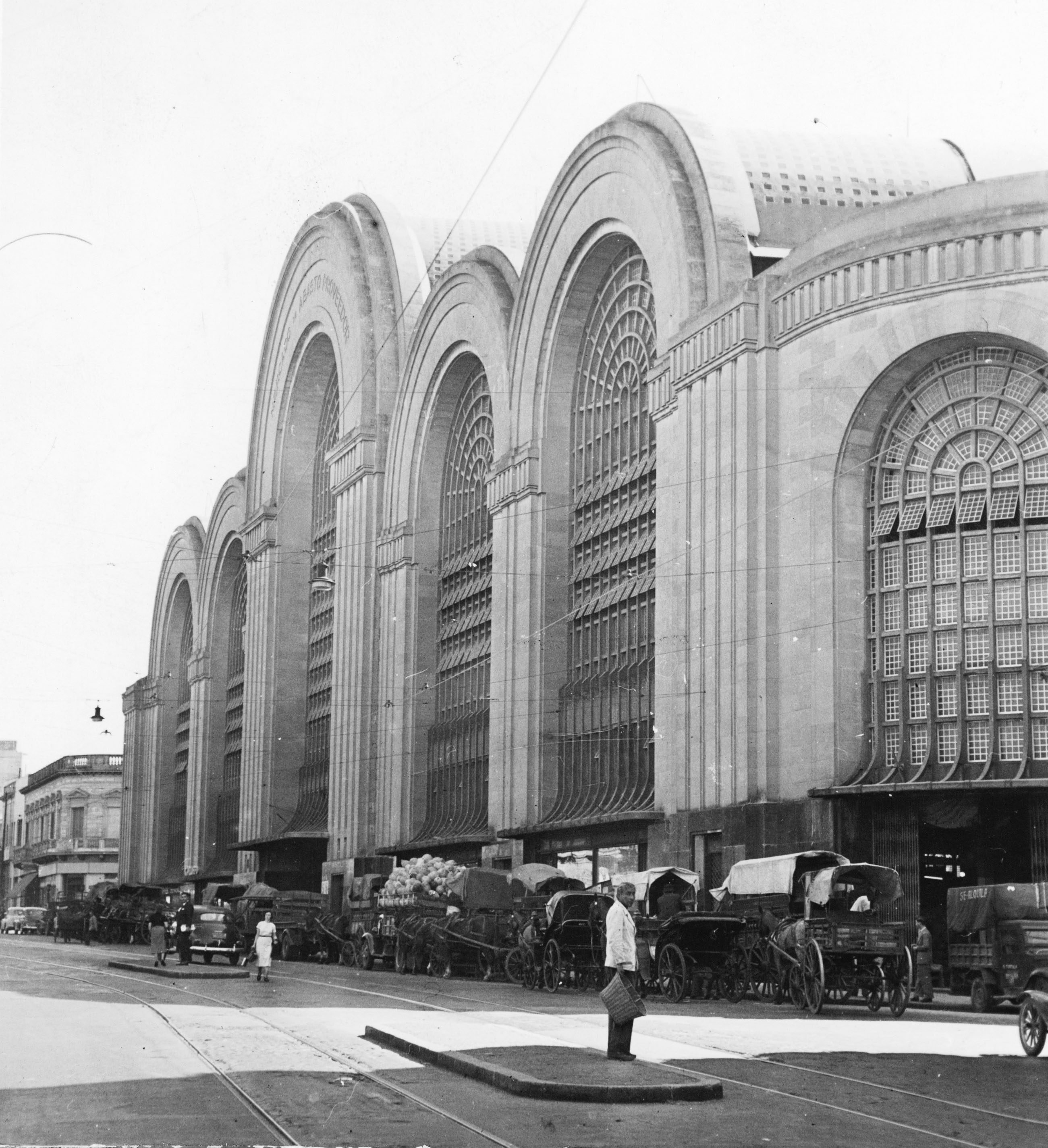
Facade of the market in 1945

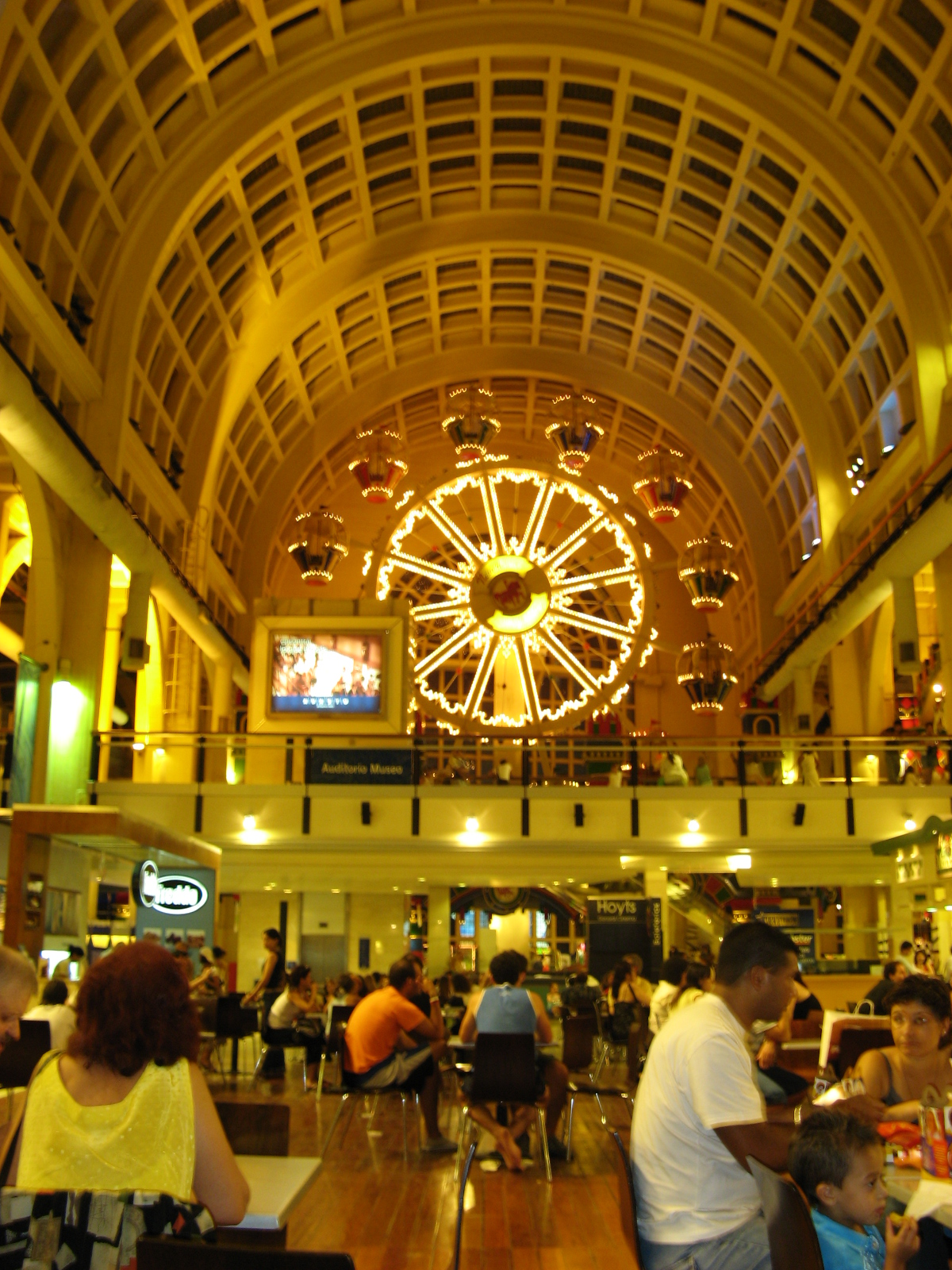
Art Deco interior

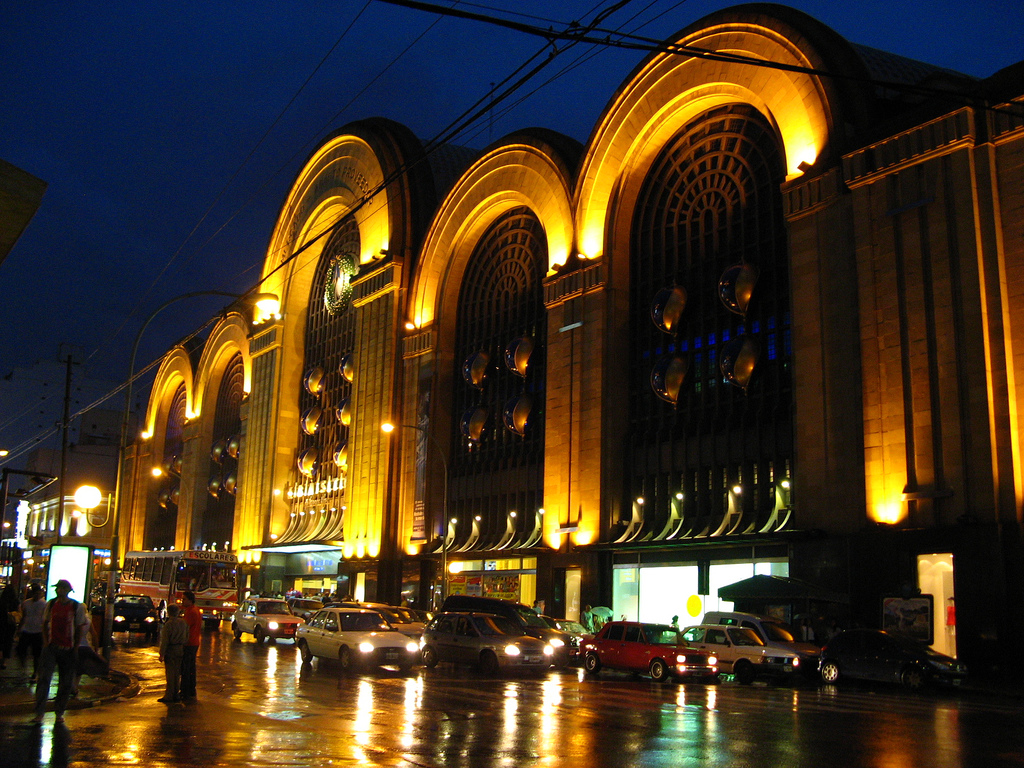
Night view of the facade

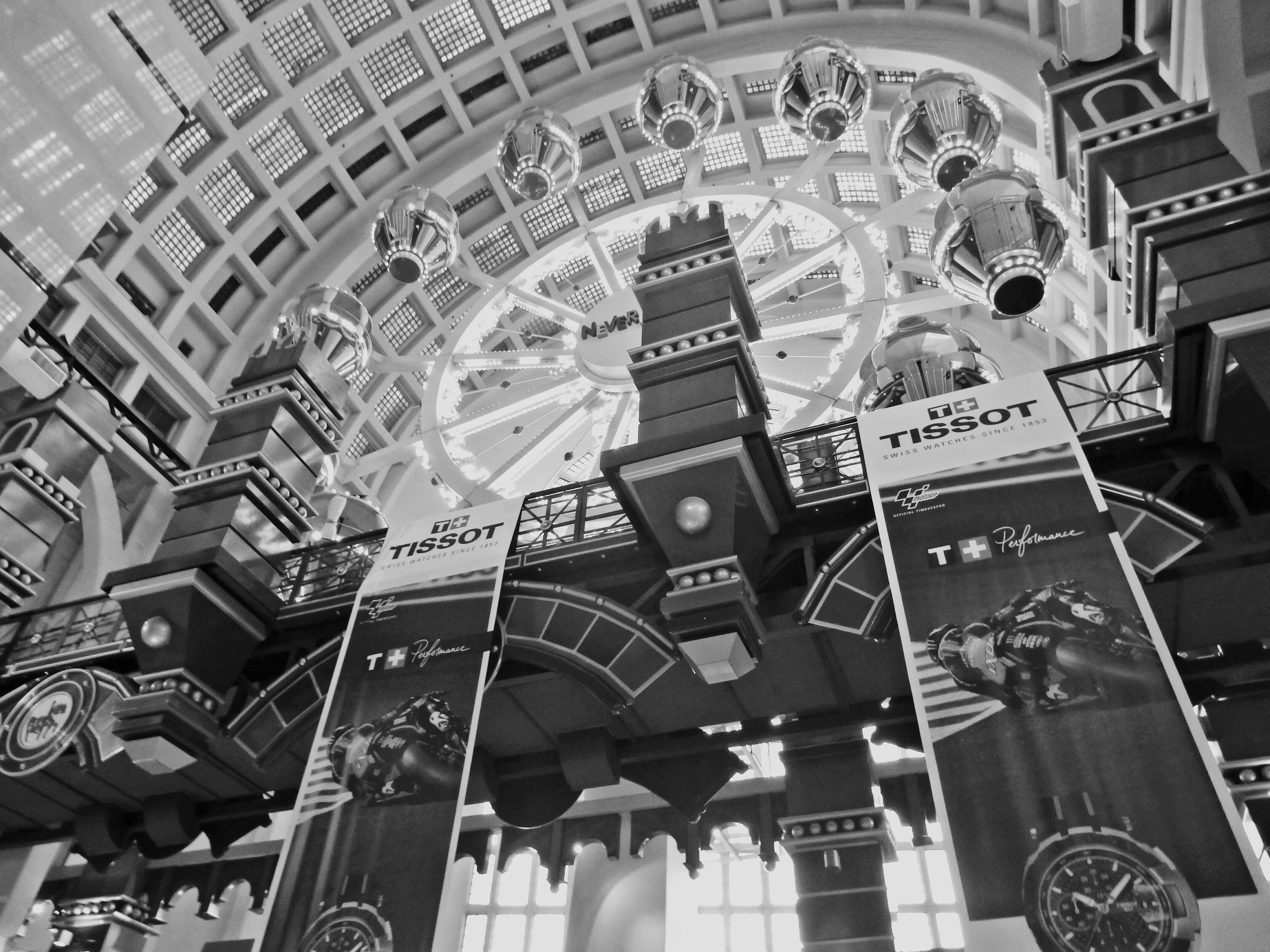
Escalator to 3rd. floor

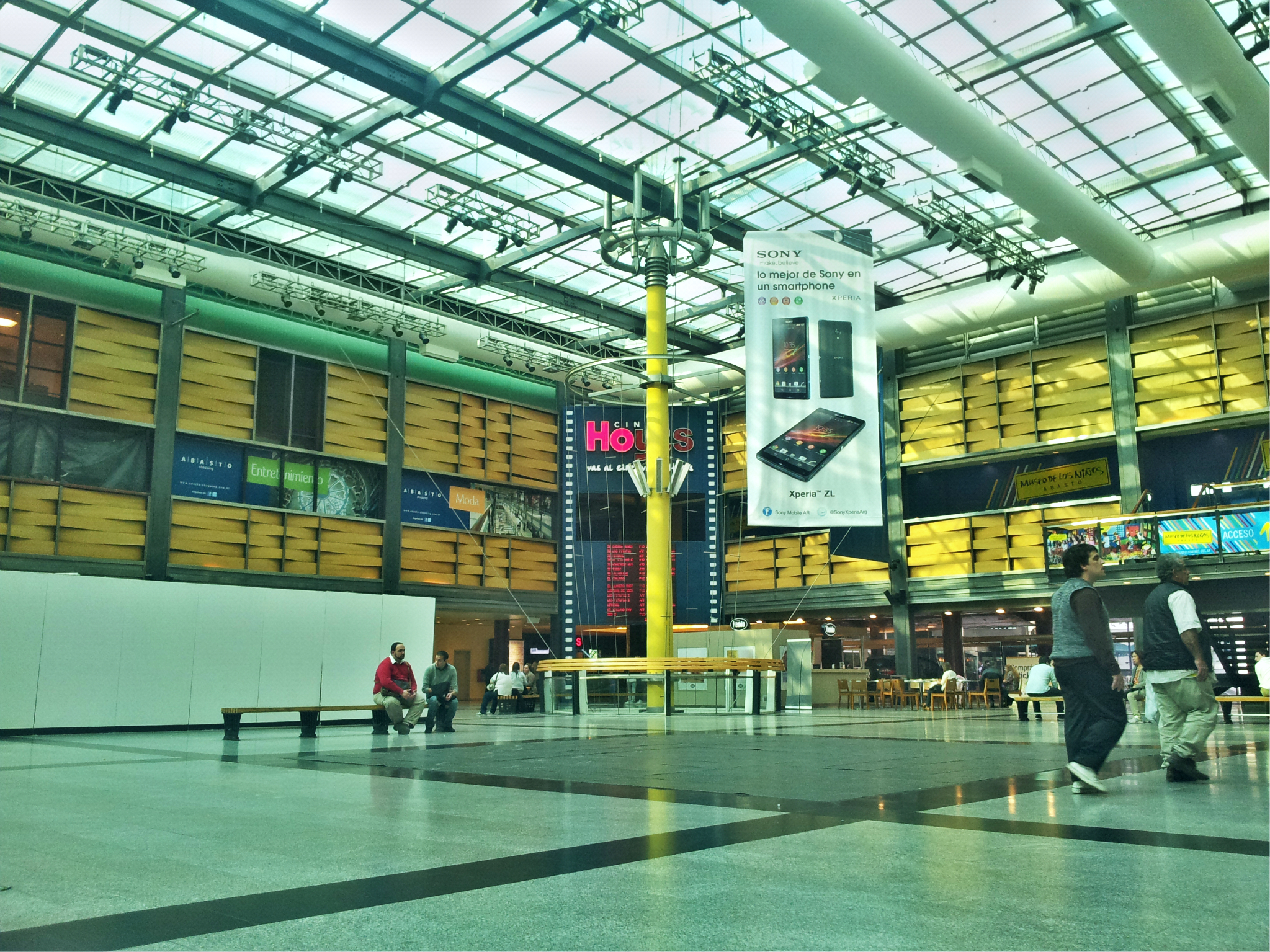
Cinemas hall
