= Distrito Arcos =

Outlet shopping center in Buenos Aires, Argentina

- Location: Palermo, Buenos Aires, Argentina
- Coordinates: 34.5798°S 58.4270°W
- Address: Paraguay 4979
- Opened: December 18, 2014; 11 years ago
- Developer: Arcos del Gourmet S.A.
- Manager: Arcos del Gourmet S.A. (IRSA)
- Owner: Playas Ferroviarias de Buenos Aires S.A. (State of Argentina)
- Architect: Seggiaro Arquitectos
- Num. of stores: 60
- Floor area: 11,170 m^{2} (120,200 sq ft) (gross leasable area)
- Parking: 115 spaces
- Website: www.distritoarcos.com

Distrito Arcos (known formally as Distrito Arcos Premium Outlet) is an open-air outlet shopping center in Palermo, Buenos Aires, Argentina, operated by Arcos del Gourmet S.A. on behalf of IRSA.

The center sits on former railway land bounded by bounded by Juan B. Justo and Santa Fe avenues, and Godoy Cruz and Paraguay streets. It opened on 18 December 2014.

== Background ==
The site once belonged to the Buenos Aires and Pacific Railway, later absorbed into the San Martín Railway network. Government oversight of the site changed hands several times after the original 2003 concession. ENABIEF, the agency that granted it, was dissolved; its successor, ONABE, was later replaced by the AABE (Agencia de Administración de Bienes del Estado).

ADIF and Arcos del Gourmet S.A. signed a new contract on 7 September 2011, readjusting the terms of use and operation. It set the concession to run through 31 December 2025, with room for a further extension.

== History ==
The project began in the early 2010s. The original plan focused on food service. It was later changed to an open-air premium outlet.

The Buenos Aires City Legislature passed Law No. 4477 in December 2012.The law rezoned the site under a new district (part of the "Nuevo Palermo II" area) as part of a broader rezoning of former railway land in Palermo, Caballito, and Liniers.

APSA Centros Comerciales presented Distrito Arcos at a pre-opening event on 12 December 2013. Actors Guillermo Francella and Adrián Suar attended, and IRSA chairman Eduardo Elsztain hosted the event.

The Federación de Comercio e Industria de la Ciudad de Buenos Aires (FECOBA) obtained an injunction blocking the center from opening to the public. The injunction stood until December 2014, when Chamber II of the Buenos Aires administrative and tax appeals court rejected FECOBA's case on the grounds that the organization lacked legal standing. The court also found that the project already had the environmental authorization it needed. Distrito Arcos opened to the public on 18 December 2014. The AABE revoked the concession through Resolution 170/14, and pressed again for the shopping center's eviction in 2019 as part of the same Palermo redevelopment project.

Argentina began easing COVID-19 restrictions in August 2020. Distrito Arcos was among the first major commercial centers in Buenos Aires allowed to reopen; its open-air layout was cited as the reason, while enclosed shopping centers remained closed.

== Architecture and layout ==
The complex is laid out as an open-air pedestrian shopping area. The land was previously used as a marshalling yard for the San Martín railway line and as storage sheds for Bodegas Giol.

Old railway buildings were converted into commercial premises facing a central walkway. Seggiaro Arquitectos carried out the architectural work with IRSA's architecture department. Grupo Landscape handled the landscape design, covering around 14,700 m^{2} (158,000 sq ft). Underground tanks were repurposed to collect rainwater for irrigation.
