= Saavedra, Buenos Aires =

Coordinates: 34°33′S 58°29′W

Saavedra
- Neighborhood of Buenos Aires
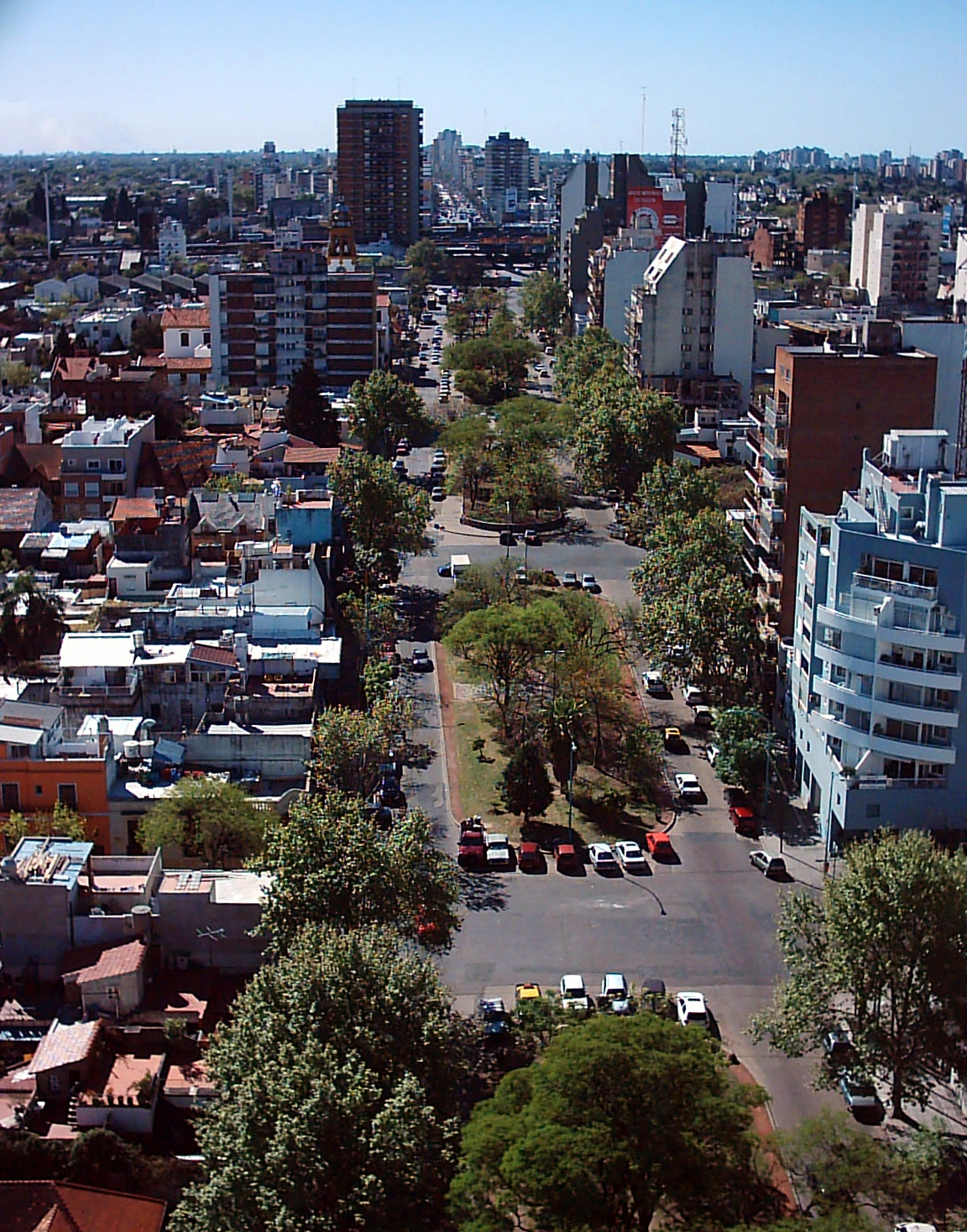
- San Isidro Boulevard

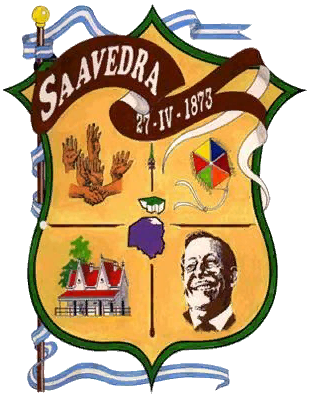
- Seal

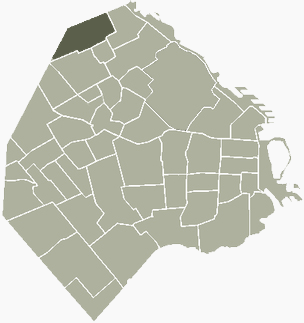
- Location of Saavedra within Buenos Aires
- Country: Argentina
- Autonomous City: Buenos Aires
- Comuna: C12

Area
  - Total: 5.9 km^{2} (2.3 sq mi)

Population
  - Total: 51,723
  - Density: 8,800/km^{2} (23,000/sq mi)
- Time zone: UTC-3 (ART)

Saavedra is a barrio or neighbourhood of Buenos Aires, Argentina. It is located in the Northern end of the city, close to Nuñez and Villa Urquiza. Its northern border is Avenida General Paz. Among the main features of the neighbourhood is the Parque Saavedra (English: Saavedra Park), which has large picnic areas and sports facilities. During weekends, many wealthy inhabitants of Buenos Aires pass through Saavedra en route to their larger estates and country clubs. The barrio was named after Cornelio Saavedra, president of the First Governing Board, during the May Revolution of 1810.

The neighbourhood's most famous son is tango singer Roberto Goyeneche. Also, it was the cradle of Club Atlético Platense sports club. The main characters of Adolfo Bioy Casares's novel El Sueño de los Héroes (English: Dream of Heroes) live in Saavedra.

The interchange between the Autopista Panamericana and Avenida General Paz is at Saavedra's northern end. Points south were the site of extensive demolition during the late 1970s tenure of military-appointed Mayor Osvaldo Cacciatore, who planned a network of new expressways including one through Saavedra, one of the city's most residential barrios. Never built, the demolished stretch was converted into Avenida Roberto Goyeneche. Saavedra is also home to an important Philips manufacturing facility and shopping center "Dot Baires", opened in 2009, which is the city's largest. Its facilities include 10 movie theaters of Hoyts chain, occupying a surface area of 6,500 m^{2} and with a total of 2,500 seats.

== Gallery ==
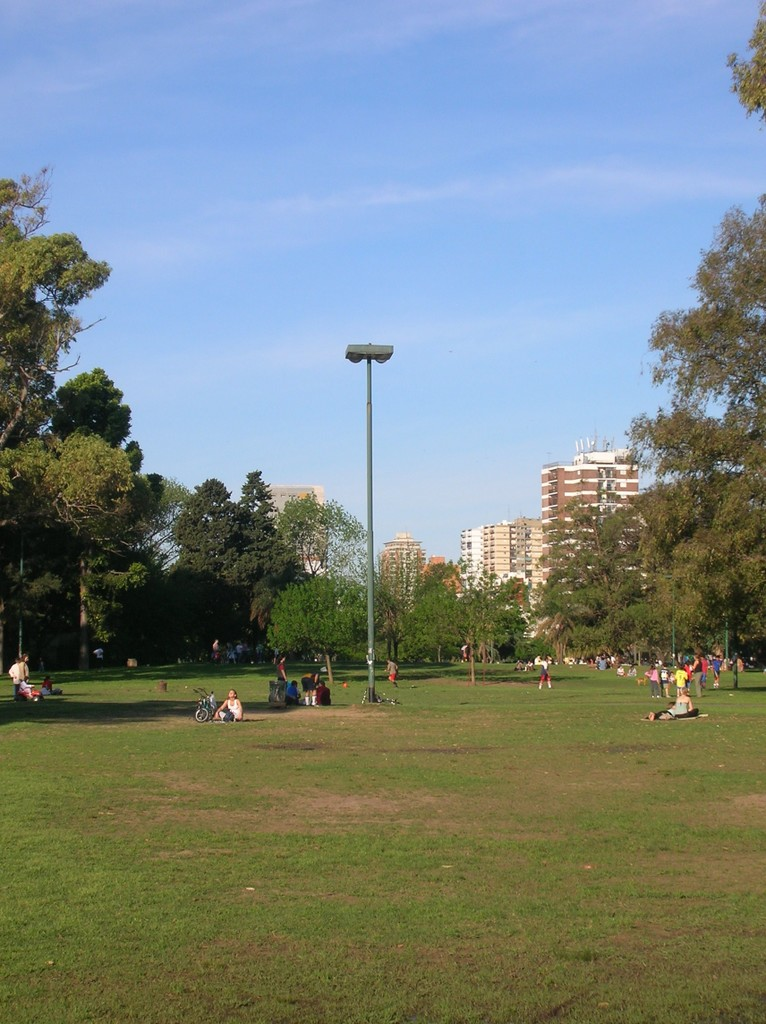
Saavedra Park

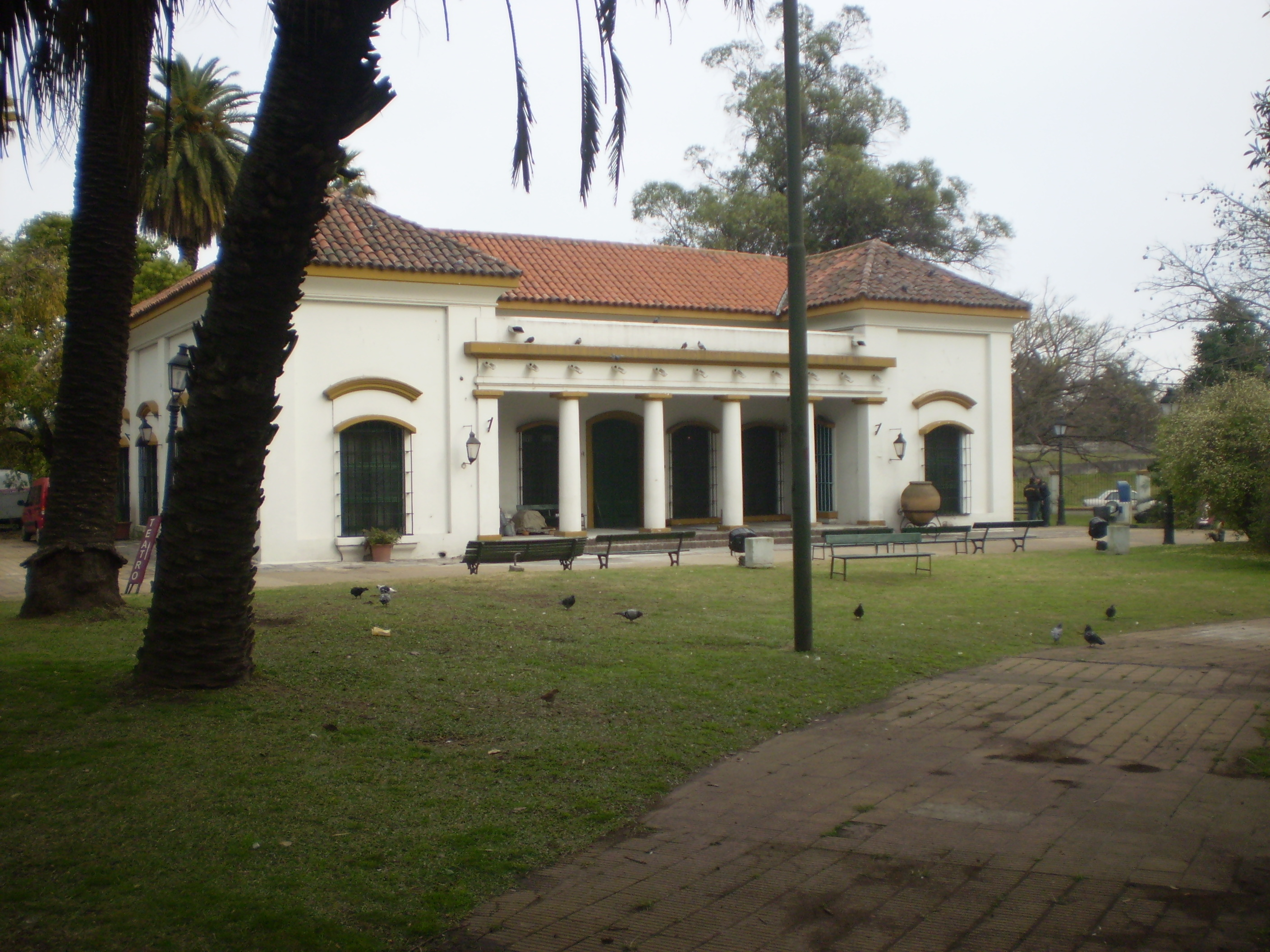
Historical Museum of Buenos Aires Cornelio Saavedra

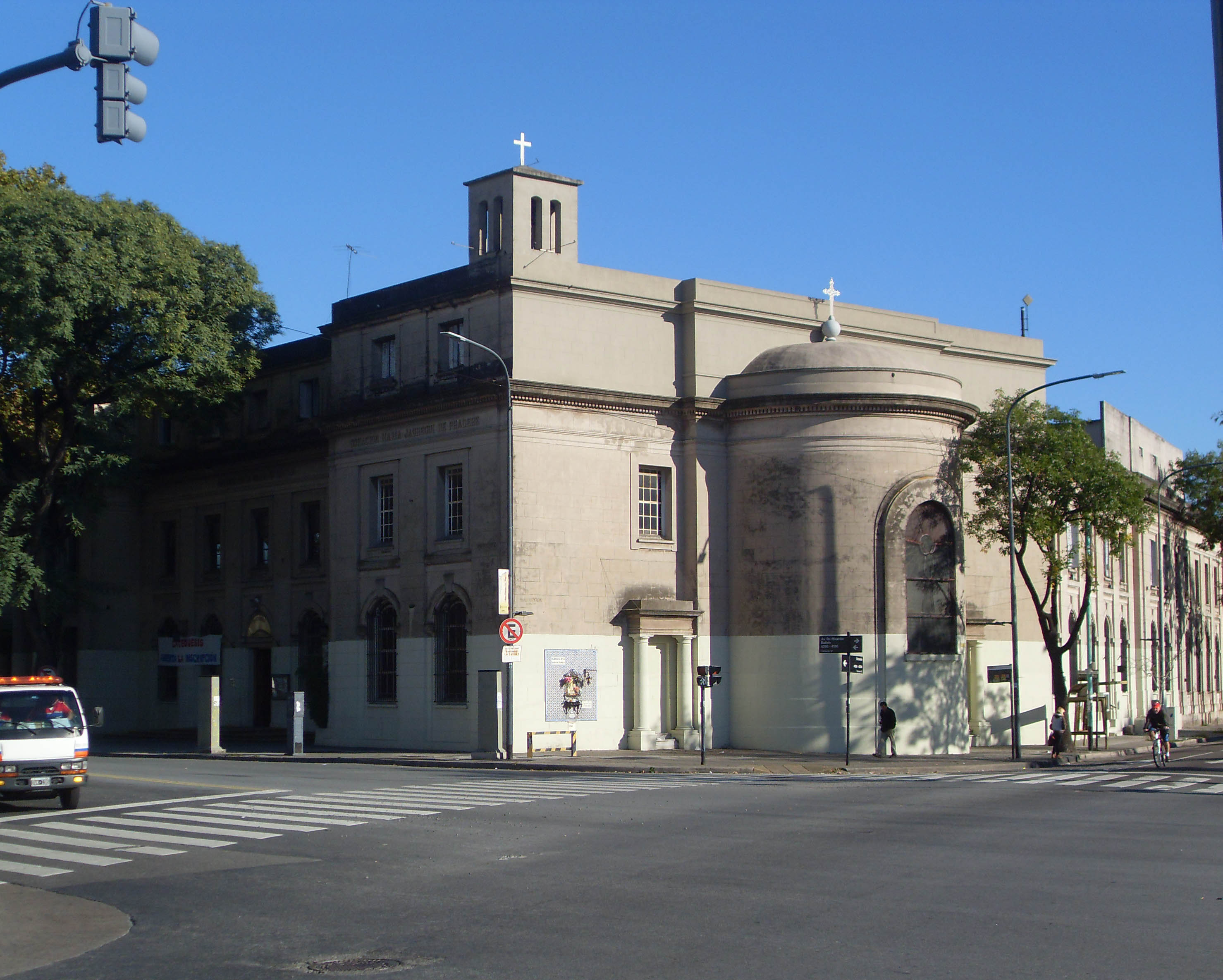
Holy Family Parish Church

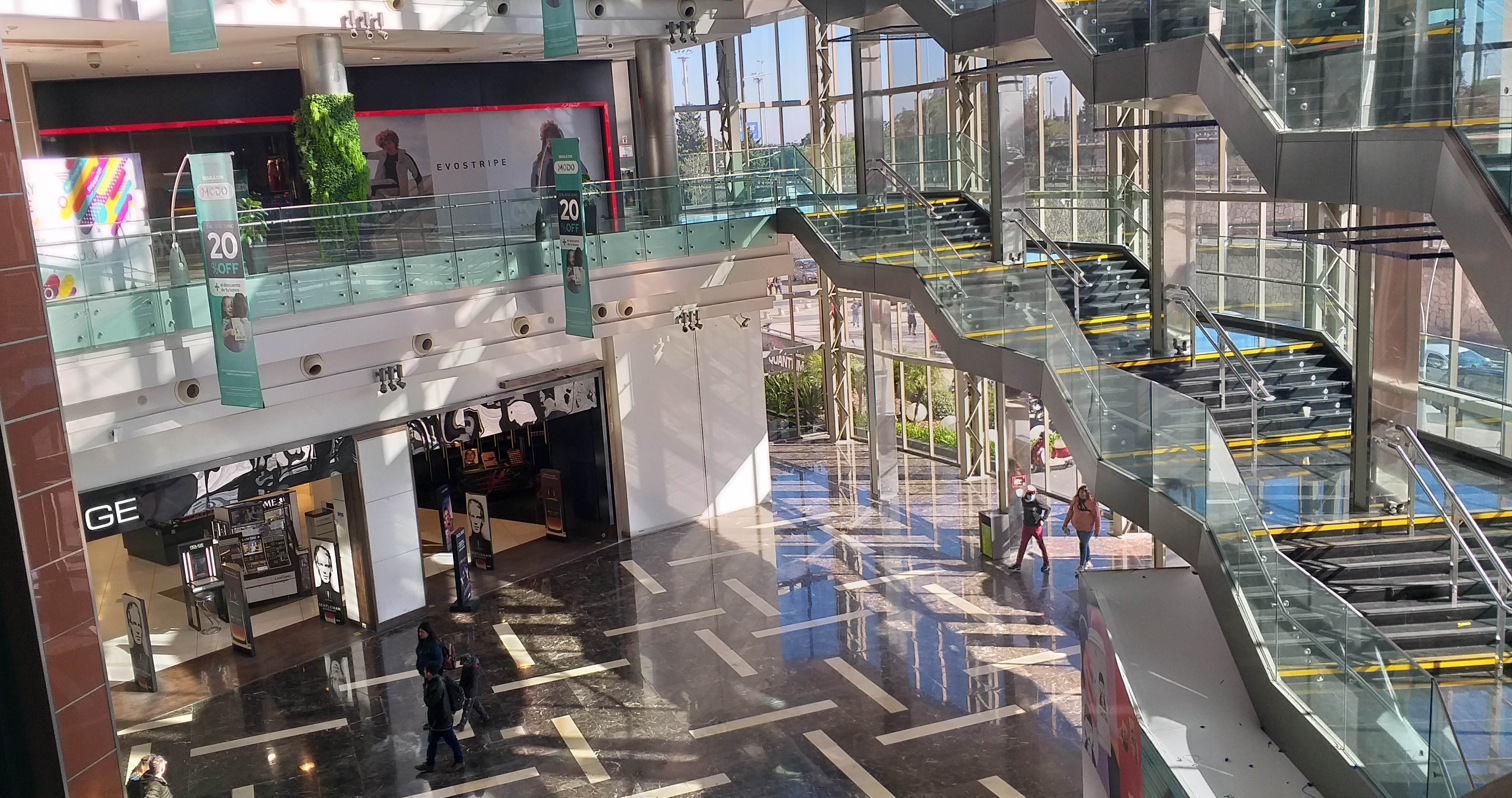
Dot Baires Shopping

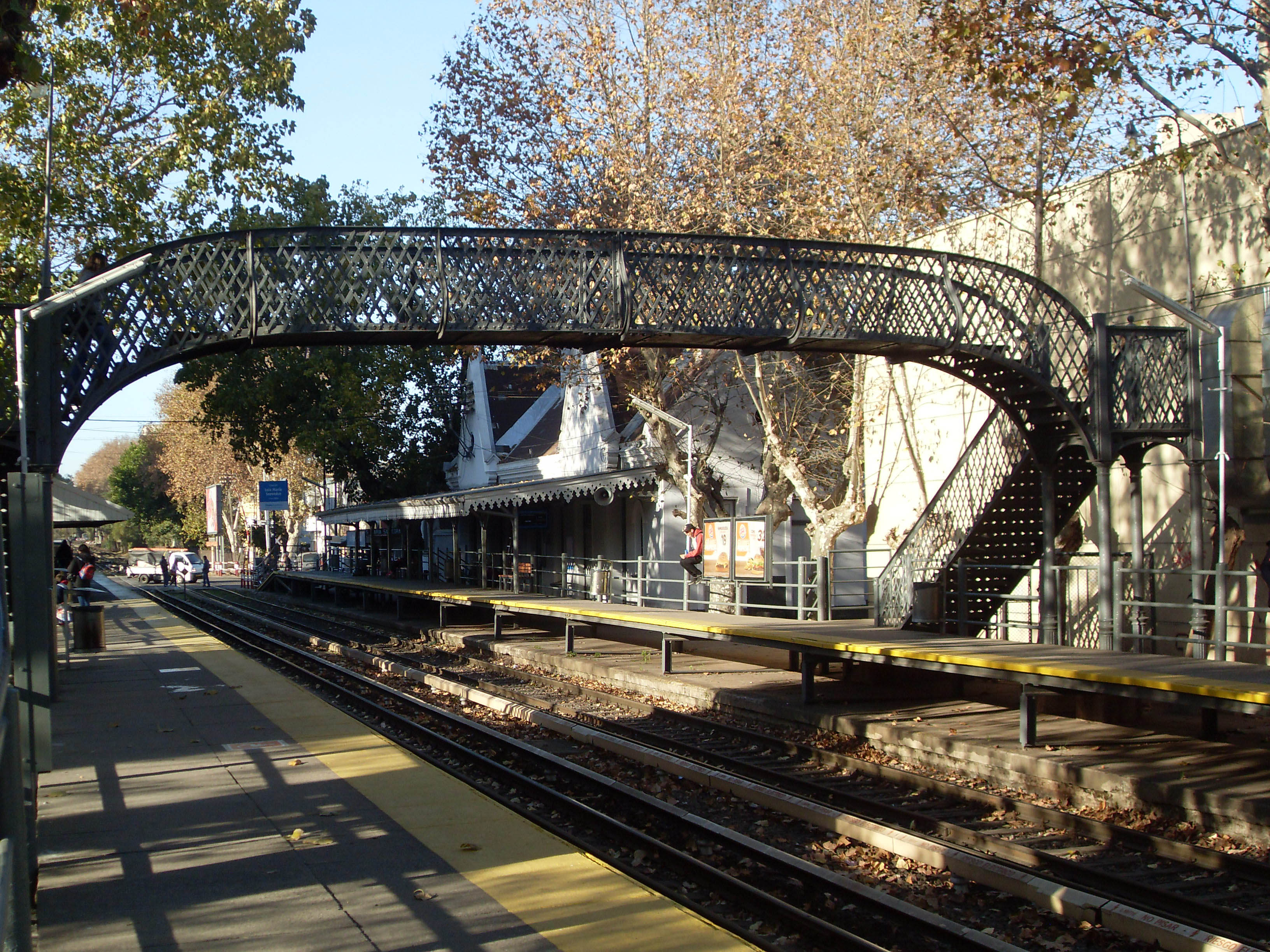
Train station Luis María Saavedra

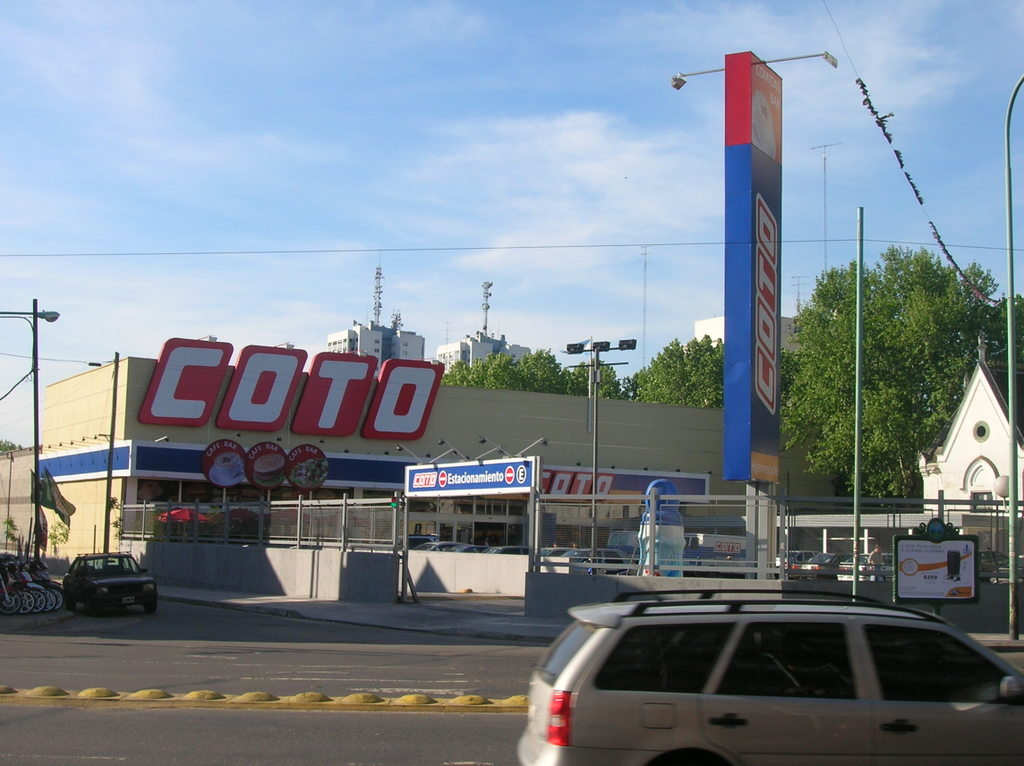
Coto Supermarket

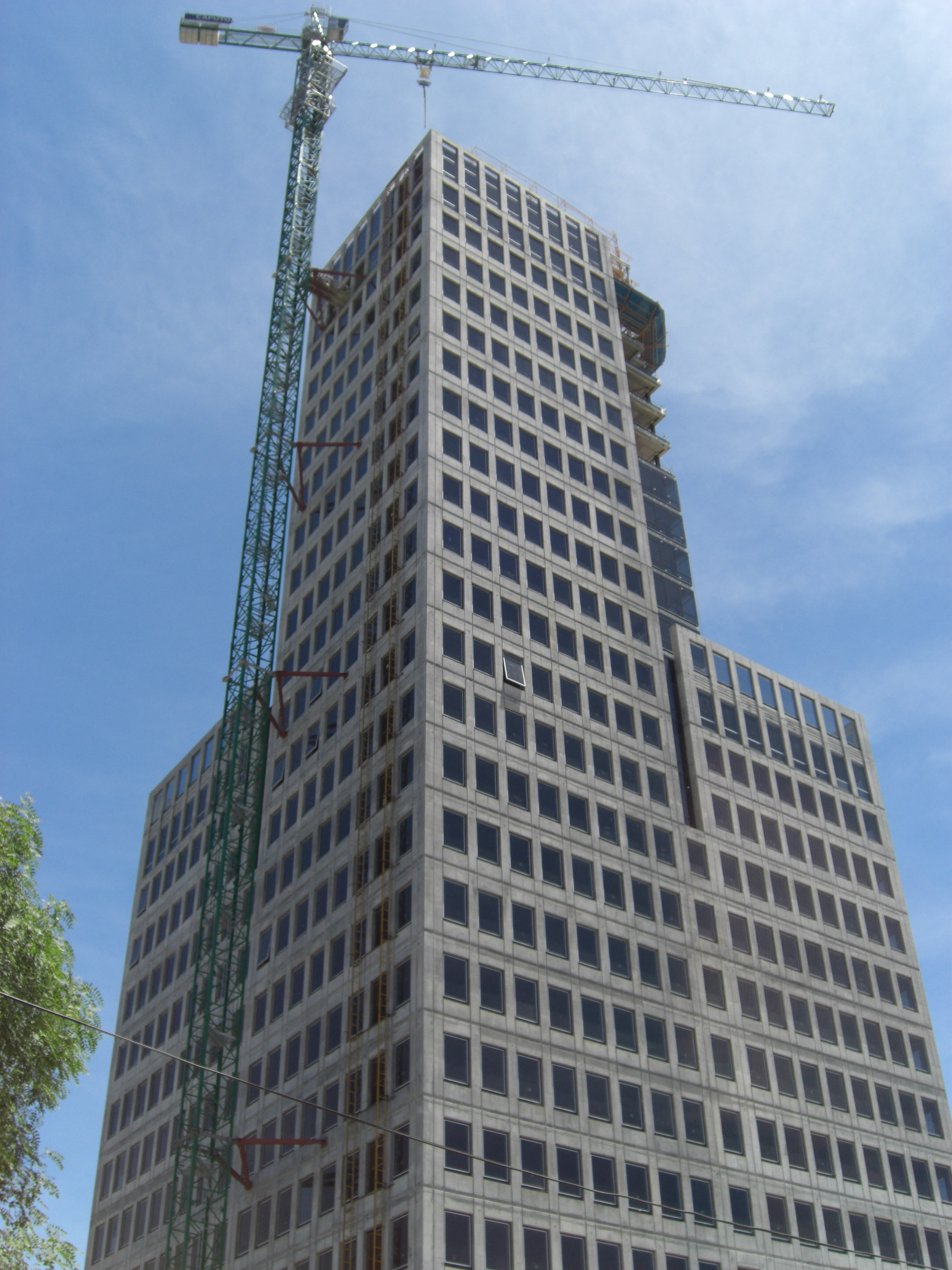
Intecons tower

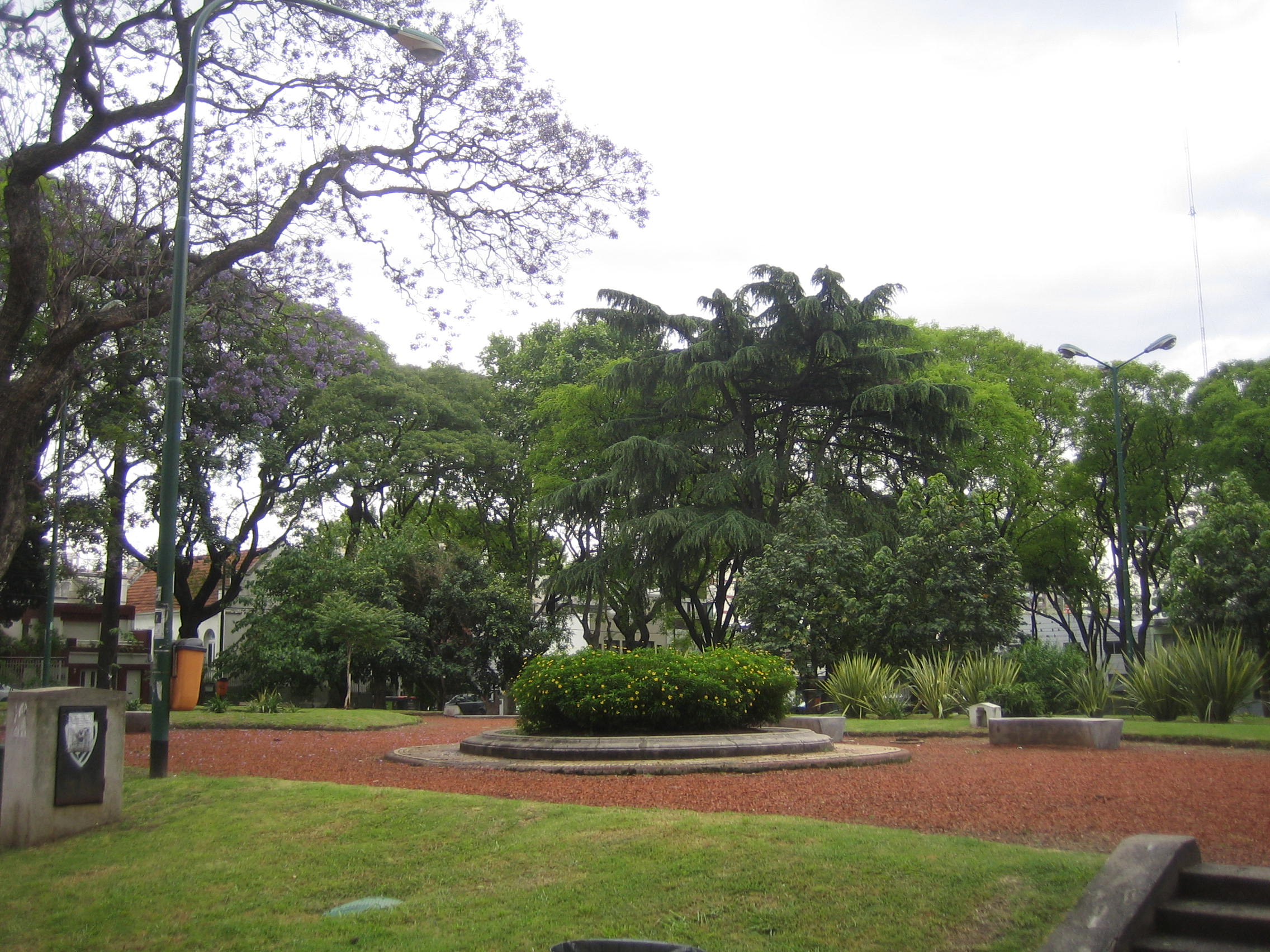
Vicuña Makenna Park

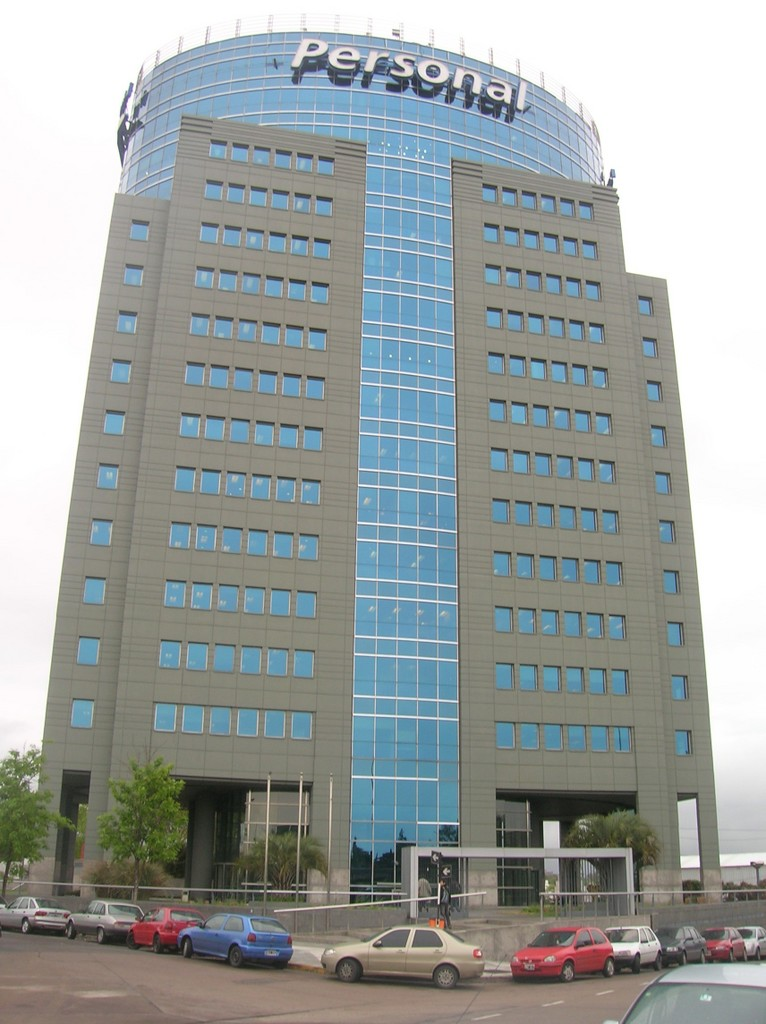
Panamericana Plaza

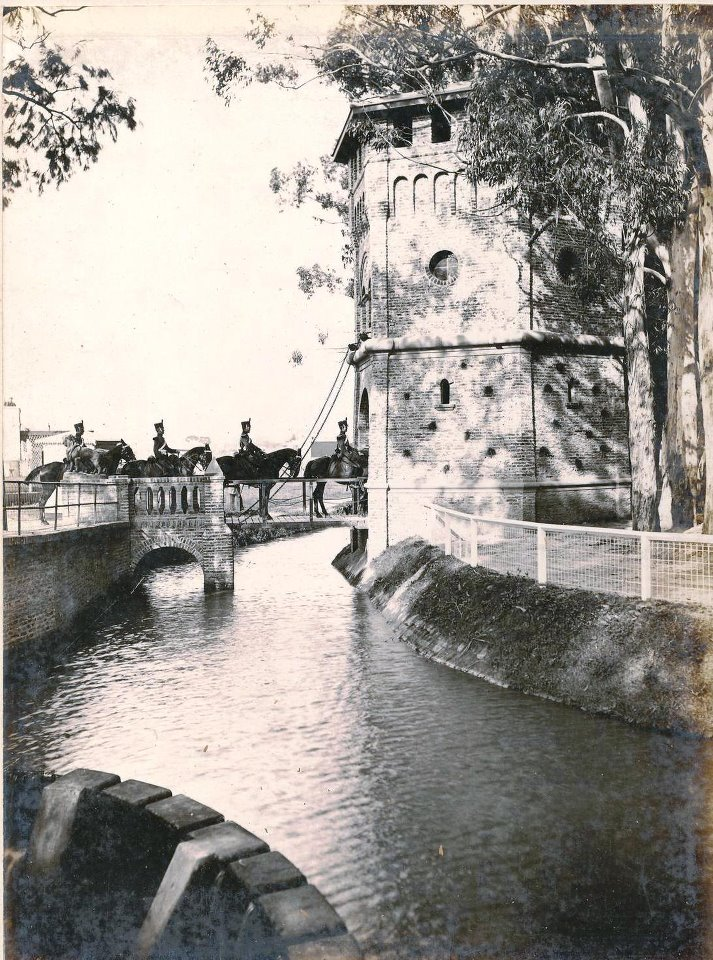
Saavedra Park (c. 1890)
