= Costanera Sur Ecological Reserve =

Nature reserve in Argentina

Coordinates: 34°36′14″S 58°21′9″W

Designations

Ramsar Wetland
- Official name: Reserva Ecológica Costanera Sur
- Designated: 22 March 2005
- Reference no.: 1459

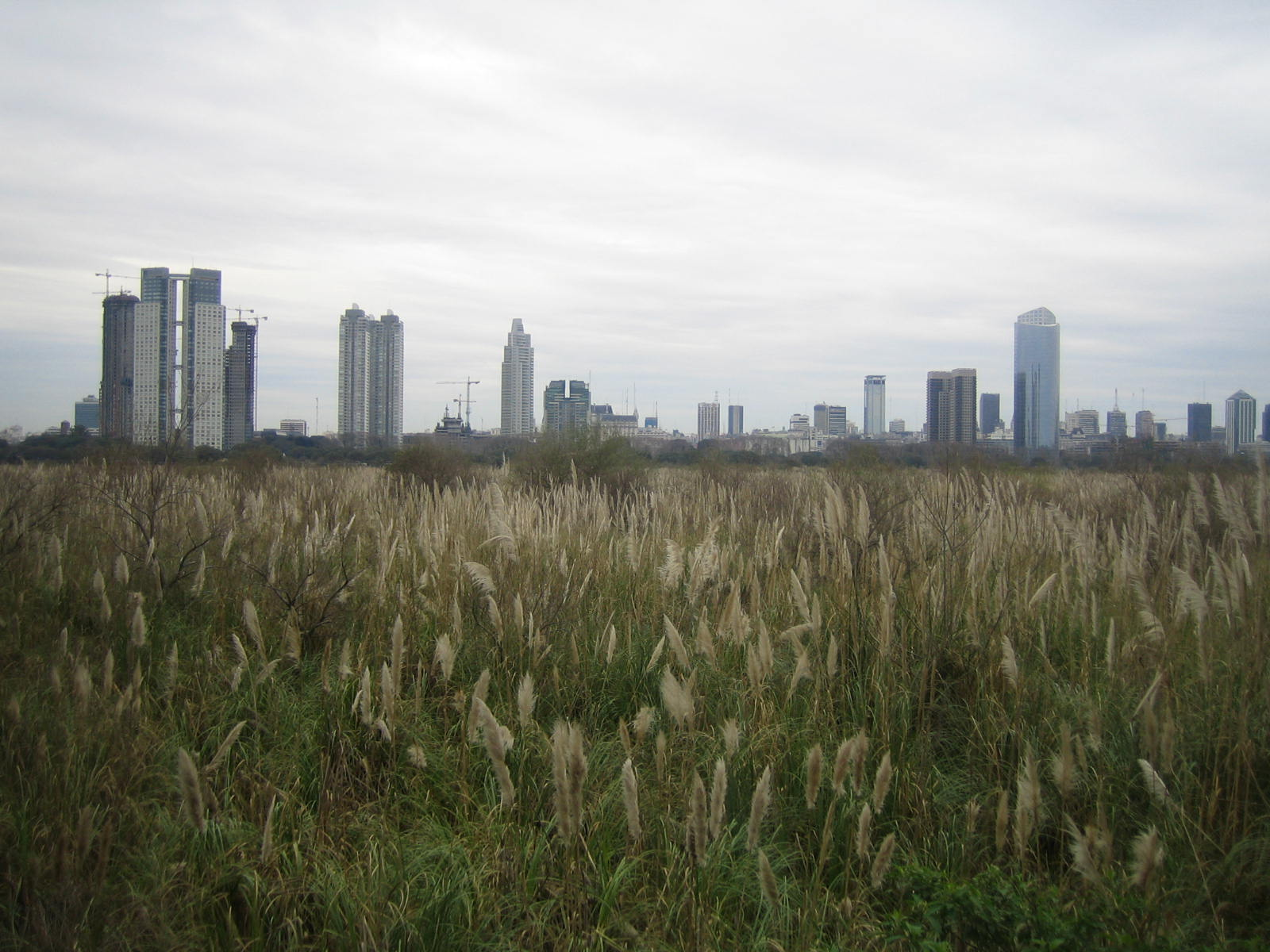
Puerto Madero viewed from the Buenos Aires Ecological Reserve

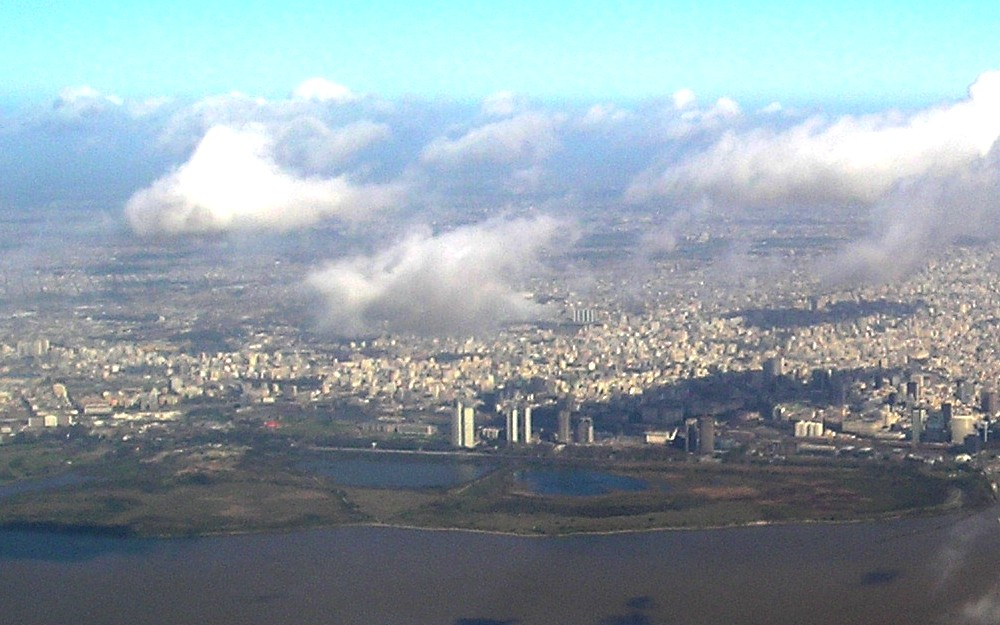
Bird's-eye view of the Buenos Aires Ecological Reserve

Buenos Aires Ecological Reserve (Spanish: Reserva Ecológica de Buenos Aires), also known as the Costanera Sur Ecological Reserve (Spanish: Reserva Ecológica Costanera Sur), is a 865-acre (3.50 km^{2}) tract of low land on the Río de la Plata riverbank located on the east side of the district of Puerto Madero in Buenos Aires CBD, Argentina.

== History ==
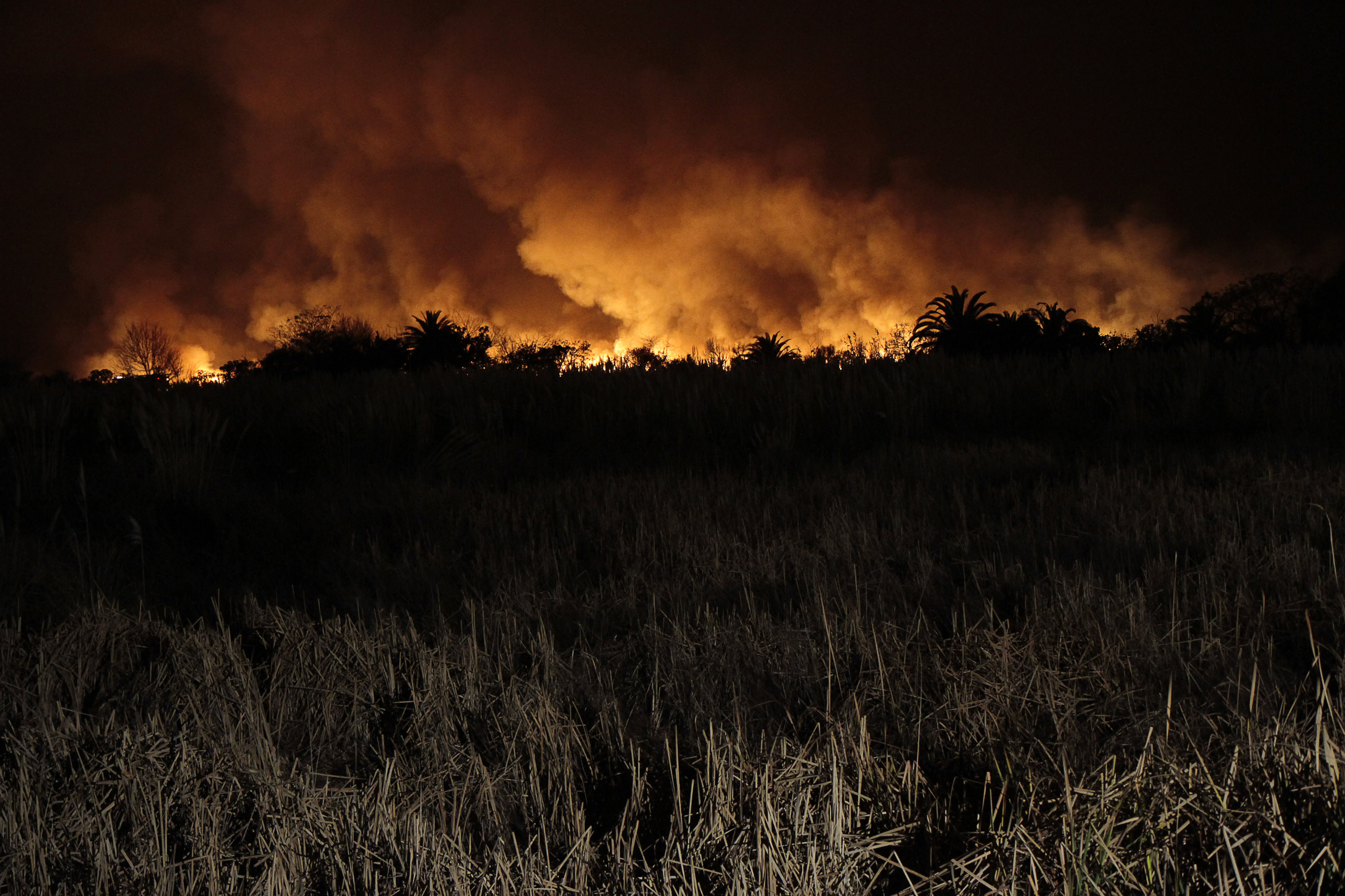
Wildfire in the reserve in July 2013.

After opening in 1918, the Municipal Riverside resort was witness to the splendour and decadence of the "Costanera Sur" promenade. On foot, by car or tram, thousands of porteños came to this place in search of fresh air in summer afternoons, or to bathe in the river, smartly clad in their one piece bathing costume and carrying a towel. In accordance to the 1923 Regulations, men and women bathed in the river separated by the long pier.

During the 1920s and 1930s, the promenade became prosperous with the setting up of bars and coffee shops which added their architectural beauty to the Nereids Fountain built by sculptor Lola Mora, the art deco-styled statue in honor to the Plus Ultra airmen, the bronze lampposts and the Monument in honor to the King and Queen of Spain. The resort became one of the porteños' favorite promenades not only during the day but also at night due to the music and variety shows performed in the coffee shops. The decline of the resort started at the end of the 1950s. Facilities began to deteriorate, many coffee shops were demolished and bathing started to be forbidden due to river contamination.

In the early 1970s, a new project was created in addition to those that had been developed in the northern city areas which consisted of reclaiming land from the river in front of the old "Costanera Sur" Riverside Resort. The land-filling started in 1978 using the Dutch "polder" system; embankments were built using debris from demolitions carried out to construct urban motorways. As the zone within the embankments filled with silt from the river, the water confined inside was drained, though this work was not fully completed.

The initial project, which included the creation of green areas and the construction of a "Government Building Area", was abandoned, although land-filling and debris dumping went on discontinuously until 1984, when works were finally ended. Since then, different plant communities developed spontaneously from seeds present in the silt, windborne or dispersed by the animals. By providing refuge and food, plants helped animal populations to settle in. From the beginning, the newly formed ponds and grasslands attracted the attention of nature lovers and bird watchers who thus started to visit them regularly. As the biological diversity increased, woods and a variety of animal species appeared. This place became a meeting point for joggers, cyclists, students, naturalists and even foreign bird watchers passing through Buenos Aires.

The official recognition occurred on June 5, 1986, when the Buenos Aires City Council voted unanimously the Ordinance 41,247 granting protection to the area, thus echoing the claims of various non-governmental organizations.

On January 9, 2009, the Ecological Reserve caught fire. The large cloud of smoke persisted over Puerto Madero for nearly 24 hours, and was eventually put out by the fire department.

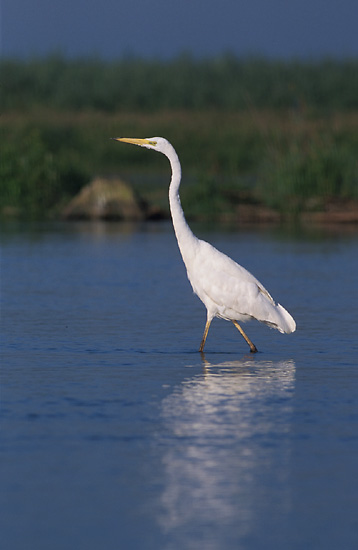
Great egret

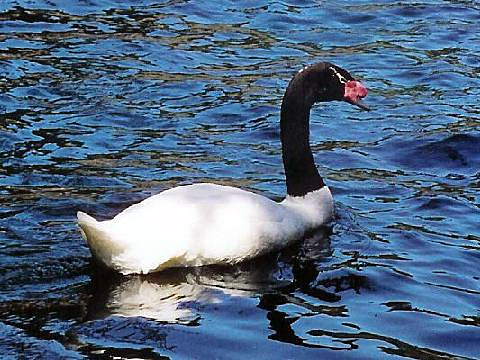
Black-necked swan

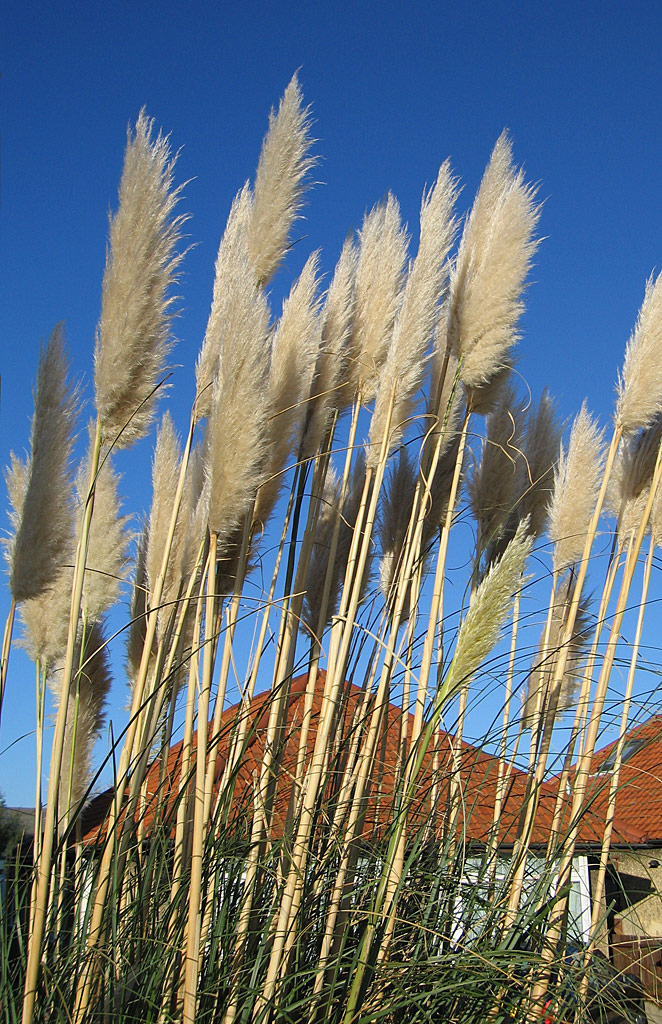
Pampas grass

== Nature trails ==
Being adjacent to the city, a visit to the Ecological Reserve is an escape from the hustle and bustle of the metropolis. A number of trails leading to the river are perfect for birdwatching, strolling, cycling and nature lovers, with many people holding picnics in the areas close to the water.

== See also ==
- List of national parks of Argentina
