= The Gypsy Madonna =

Painting by Titian

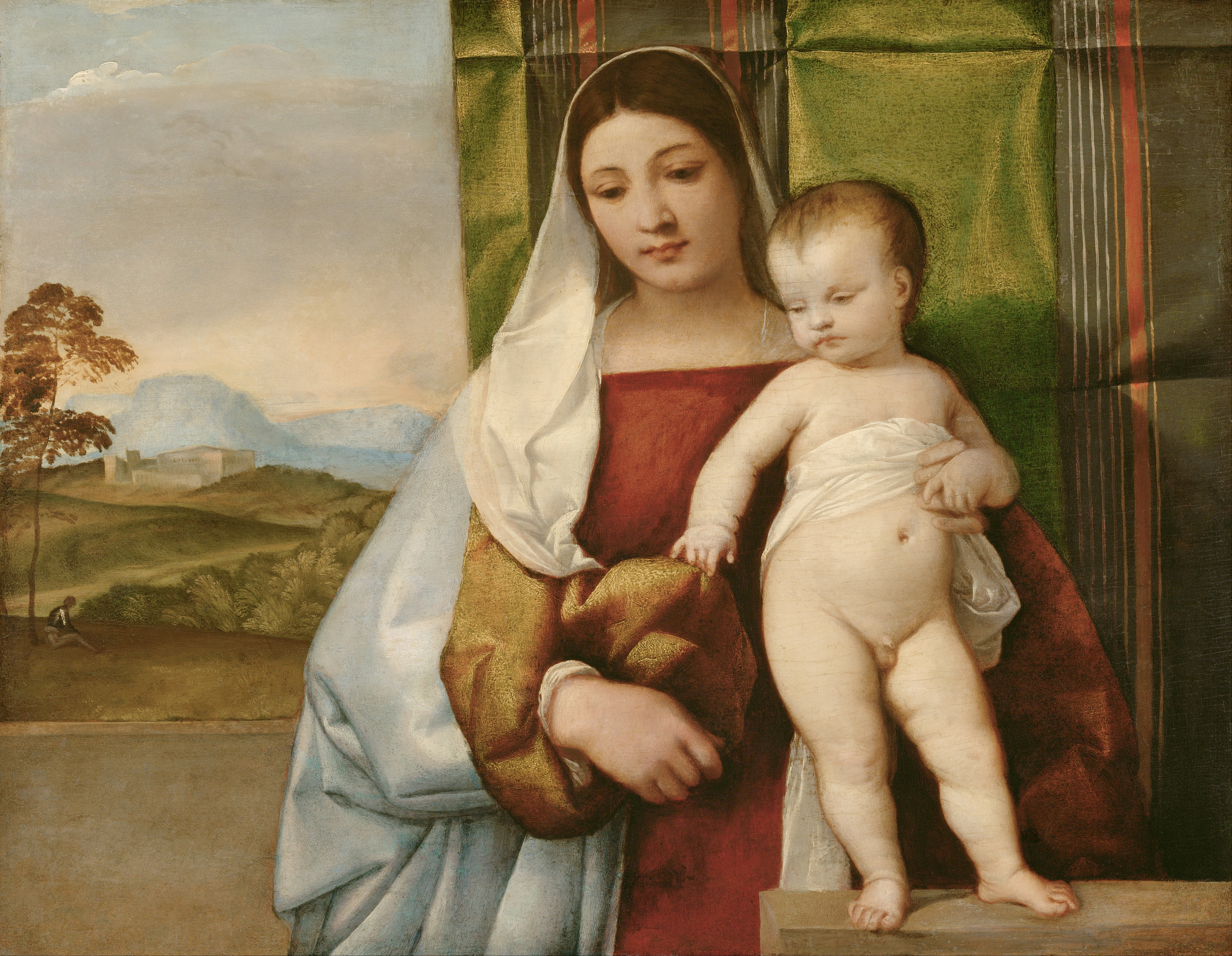
- Artist: Titian
- Year: c. 1510–11
- Medium: oil on panel
- Dimensions: 65.8 cm × 83.8 cm (25.9 in × 33.0 in)
- Location: Kunsthistorisches Museum, Vienna

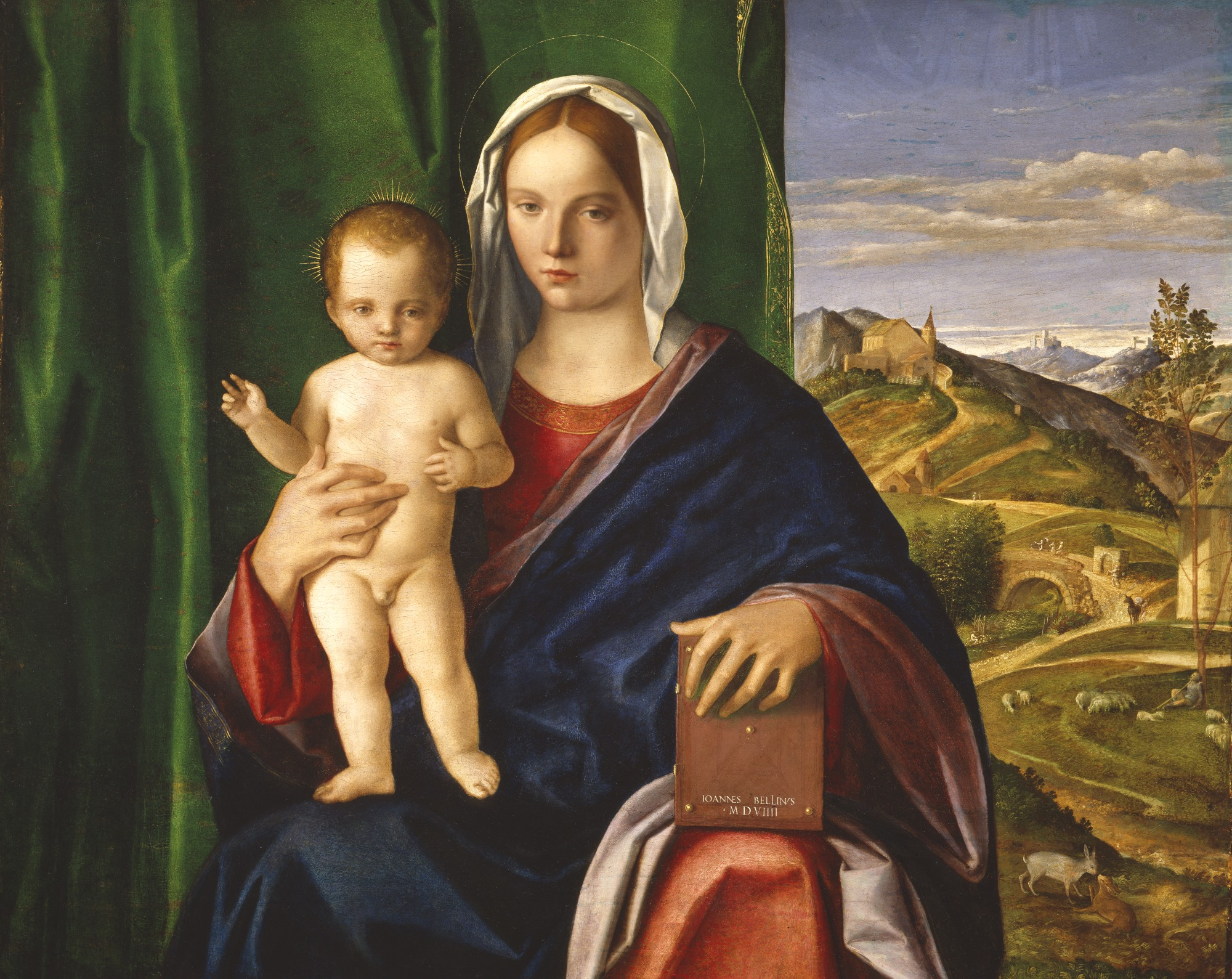
The Detroit Madonna by Giovanni Bellini

The Gypsy Madonna (Italian: Madonna zingarella) is a panel painting of the Madonna and Child in oils of about 1510–11, by Titian, now in the Kunsthistorisches Museum, in Vienna. It is a painting made for display in a home rather than a church.

It is close to compositions by Titian's former master Giovanni Bellini, especially, when reversed, one of 1509 in the Detroit Institute of Arts, and has been seen as a challenge to the much older master, by taking on a characteristic compositional formula of his. The style is much indebted to Giorgione, and it was often attributed to him in the earlier 20th century. This is especially so in the "harmonious fullness and slow gravity of form" of the figure of the Virgin, which uses a type of figure Titian did not repeat in later Madonnas. The landscape is virtually identical to the left-most section of the background of the Dresden Venus, traditionally thought to have been begun by Giorgione, but with the landscape done after his death in 1510 by Titian.

The right background is occupied with a cloth of honour, painted with careful attention to its folds (they were often stored folded up). These were hung behind thrones, as in very many paintings of enthroned Madonnas, and here it implies that an unoccupied throne is out of sight to the right. The Bellini in Detroit uses the same device. The composition is therefore a half-way stage between the older more formal enthroned Madonnas and newer compositions with the Virgin and Child shown informally in a landscape setting. Madonnas by Bellini and his followers had for some time been showing small glimpses of landscape to the sides of the painting, usually cut off by a parapet lower down, and the formula here, using a horizontal "landscape" format, develops this.

== Appreciation ==
The "Gypsy Madonna" is a 19th-century name for the painting, because of the Virgin's supposed "dusky complexion and her dark hair and eyes," she was seen as resembling a Romani woman. She seems young even by the standards of Madonnas, and the hands of the Child are unusually engaged, respectively with his mother's fingers and her dress (this is a difference to the Bellini).

According to S. J. Freedberg,

the effect of sensuous existence Titian makes by his command of optical device is of an extreme virtuosity. No picture before this attains a comparable sense of presences existing palpably within an atmosphere, reflecting coloured light but also absorbing it to saturation point, so that each pore of flesh or drapery makes texture.

Despite the debts to Bellini and Giorgione, the painting shows Titian, who was then around twenty-one, developing his own independent character and style.

== Technical ==
Technical examinations show that it was originally even closer to the Bellini in Detroit, and that many changes were made in the course of painting. Unlike Bellini's usual careful underdrawing, Titian "used as his guidelines only summary strokes made with a fairly wide brush with thin wash shading". Among several other changes, the head of the Child originally looked out at the viewer.

== Provenance ==
Like several other important early Venetian paintings in Vienna, the work was (very likely) in the Venetian collection of Bartolomeo della Nave and in 1636 sold in Venice to the Duke of Hamilton, who brought it to London. In 1659, after Hamilton's execution, it was acquired by Archduke Leopold Wilhelm of Austria in Brussels, whose collection soon passed to the imperial collection in Vienna.

== See also ==
- List of works by Titian
