= Sleeping Venus (Giorgione) =

Painting by Giorgione

- Venere dormiente (Italian)
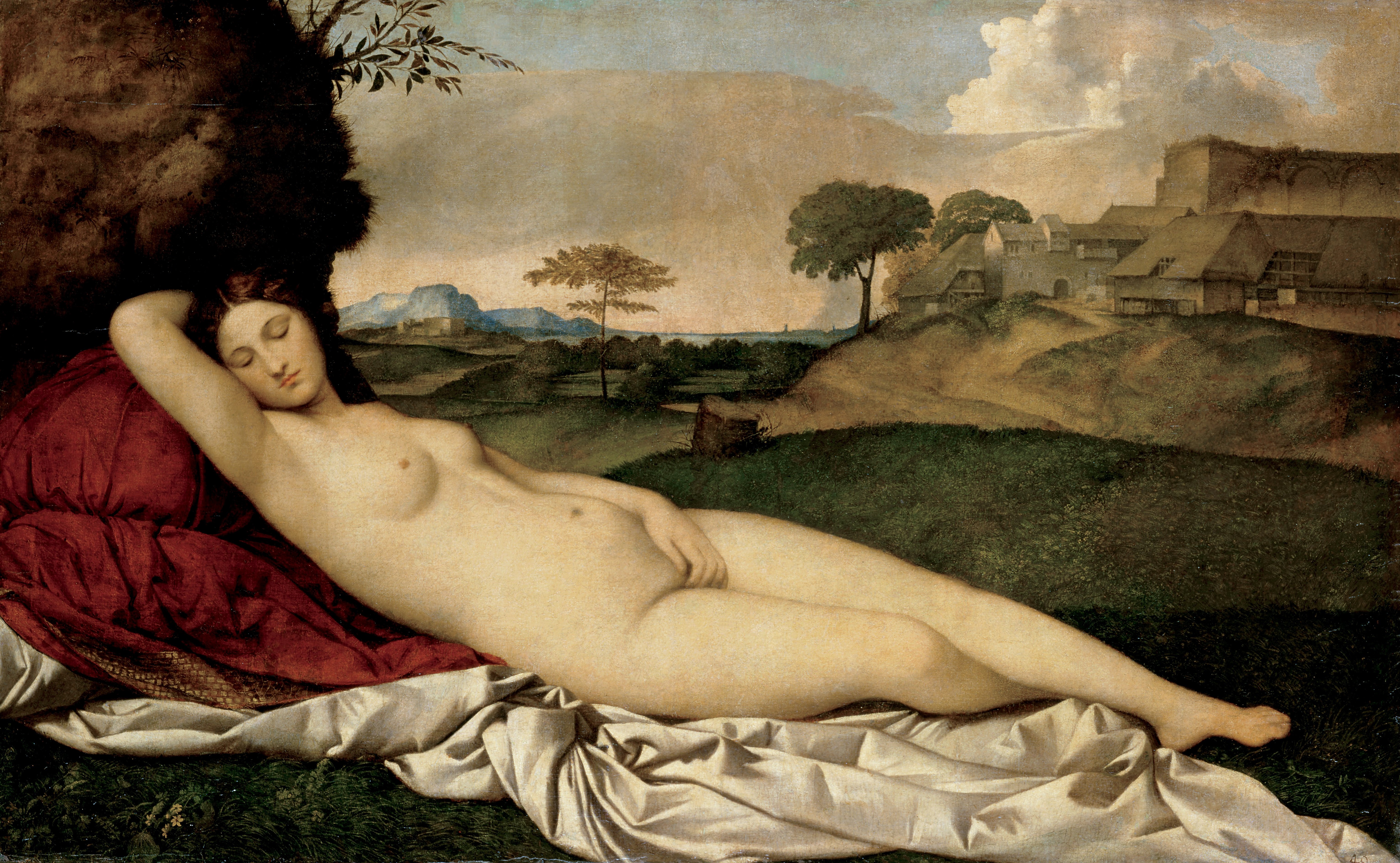
- Artist: Giorgione and/or Titian
- Year: c. 1510
- Medium: Oil on canvas
- Dimensions: 108.5 cm × 175 cm (42.7 in × 69 in)
- Location: Gemäldegalerie Alte Meister, Dresden

The Sleeping Venus (Italian: Venere dormiente), also known as the Dresden Venus (Venere di Dresda), is a painting traditionally attributed to the Italian Renaissance painter Giorgione, although it has long been widely thought that Titian completed it after Giorgione's death in 1510. The landscape and sky are generally accepted to be mainly by Titian. In the 21st century, much scholarly opinion has shifted further, to see the nude figure of Venus as also painted by Titian, leaving Giorgione's contribution uncertain. It is in the Gemäldegalerie, Dresden. After World War II, the painting was briefly in possession of the Soviet Union.

The painting, one of the last works by Giorgione (if it is), portrays a nude woman whose profile seems to echo the rolling contours of the hills in the background. It is the first known reclining nude in Western painting, and together with the Pastoral Concert (Louvre), another painting disputed between Titian and Giorgione, it established "the genre of erotic mythological pastoral", with female nudes in a landscape, accompanied in that case by clothed males. A single nude woman in any position was an unusual subject for a large painting at this date, although it was to become popular for centuries afterwards, as "the reclining female nude became a distinctive feature of Venetian painting".

There was originally a sitting figure of Cupid beside Venus's feet, which was overpainted in the 19th century. In addition, in the course of painting, the landscape was changed at both sides, as was the colouring of the drapery, and the head of Venus was originally seen in profile, making it very similar to Titian's later Pardo Venus. Through a series of x-rays in the 20th century, researchers were able to determine conclusively that this painting had contained different elements that were painted over. The reasons for these later changes are still unknown, although they could have been suggested by the commissioner of the work.

== History ==
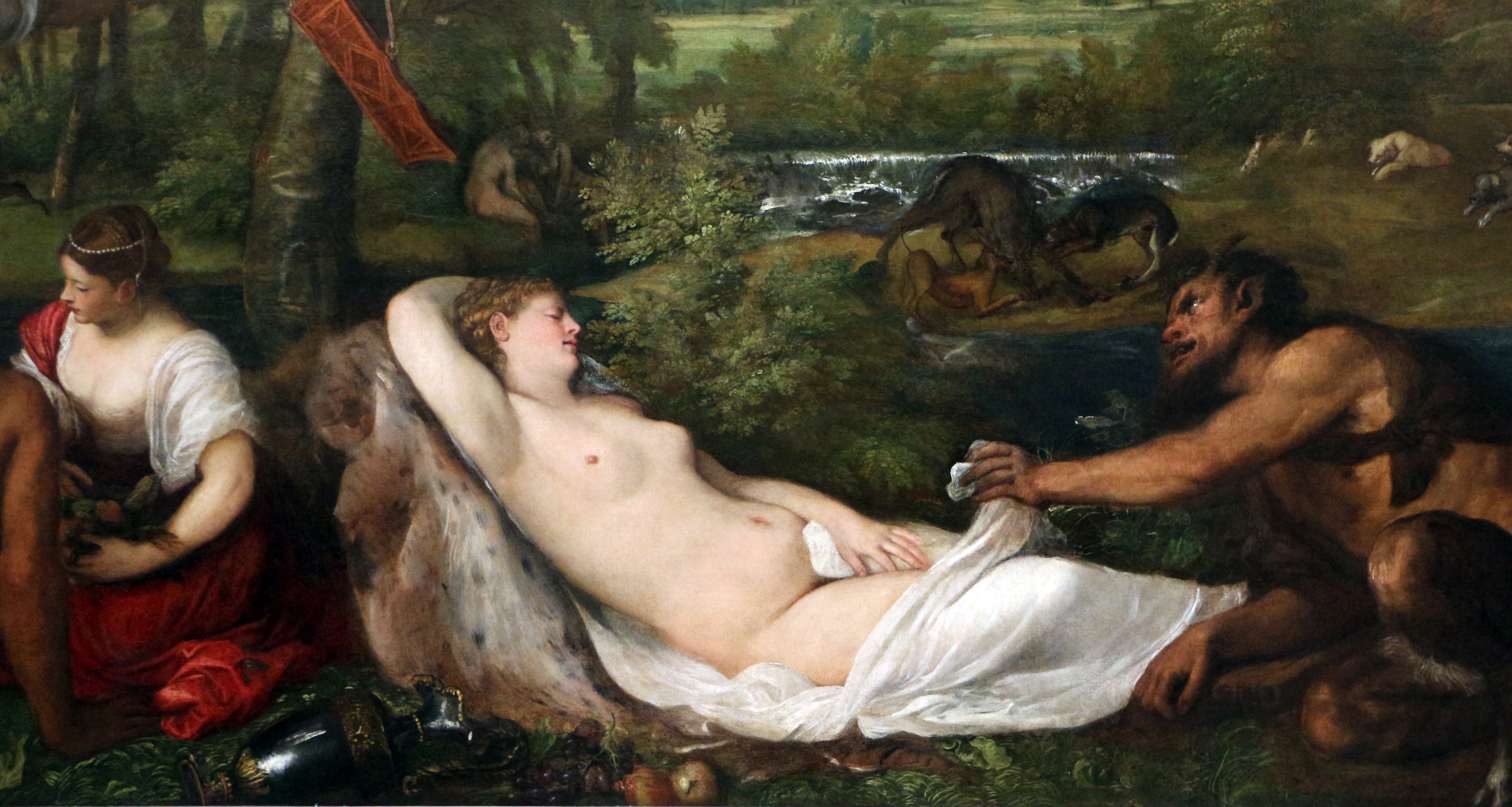
Jupiter and Antiope, detail of Titian's Pardo Venus

According to the usual account, the painting was unfinished at the time of Giorgione's death. The landscape and sky were later finished by Titian, who in 1534 painted the similar Venus of Urbino, and several other reclining female nudes, such as his much repeated Venus and Musician and Danaë compositions, both from the 1540s onwards. Other elements reused by Titian are the mountains on the horizon at left, which reappear in The Gypsy Madonna (c. 1511, Vienna) and the buildings on the right, seen again in the Noli me tangere of c. 1514 (National Gallery).

The painting is usually identified with one, including a Cupid, described in the collection of Girolamo Marcello in 1525 by Marcantonio Michiel, a Venetian patrician interested in art, who left notes compiled between about 1521 and 1543 on paintings he saw. He describes the painting as by Giorgione, but with the landscape completed by Titian, and until very recently this double attribution has been generally accepted, despite art historians knowing that "Giorgiones" were already rare and over-attributed even by this early date. At least by the time Carlo Ridolfi saw the Marcello painting, about a century later, Cupid was holding a bird, whereas in the Dresden painting (viewed in x-rays) he seems to be pointing his bow, perhaps at the viewer, although his pose is hard to decipher. It remains possible that the Marcello painting is not in fact the one now in Dresden, or that it is, but that the information Michiel was presumably given as to its authorship is incorrect.

Marcello married in 1507, and it has been suggested that he commissioned the painting to celebrate this; the suitability of a reclining nude as a marriage picture has also been explored in connection with the Venus of Urbino.

The painting was bought from a French dealer for Augustus the Strong of Saxony in 1695 as a Giorgione, but by 1722 was described in a catalogue as the "Famous Venus lying in a landscape by Titian". By the early 19th century it was thought to be a copy after Titian. It was not identified with the painting Michiel saw before the 19th century, when Giovanni Morelli proposed this, following which Michiel's attribution to Giorgione, with a Titian landscape, was mostly accepted for over a century. Any underdrawing was lost when the painting was transferred to a new canvas, probably in the early 19th century.

== Critical reception ==
According to Sydney Freedberg, underlying erotic implications are made by Venus's raised arm and the placement of her left hand on her groin. The sheets are painted in silver, being a cold colour rather than the more commonly used warm tones for linens, and they are rigid looking in comparison to those depicted in similar paintings by Titian or Velázquez. The landscape mimics the curves of the woman's body and this, in turn, relates the human body back to being a natural, organic object. Freedberg writes:

The shape of being is the visual demonstration of a state of being in which idealized existence is suspended in immutable slow-breathing harmony. All the sensuality has been distilled off from this sensuous presence, and all incitement; Venus denotes not the act of love but the recollection of it. The perfect embodiment of Giorgione's dream, she dreams his dream herself.

The art historian Michael Paraskos has suggested that the painting may be an allegory of the island of Cyprus, which was ceded to Venice by Queen Caterina Cornaro in 1489. Paraskos suggests that the painting was created under influence of the exiled court of the Kingdom of Cyprus, which the Venetian Senate permitted to be established-in-exile at Asolo in the Veneto, and that it evokes a sense of loss and longing to return. As well as suggesting the body of Venus is posed to resemble the shape of the island, Paraskos claims that the geographical features surrounding her resemble those that could be seen by travelling from the Lusignan summer palace at Potamia in the south east of Cyprus, towards the Troodhos mountains in the west.

== Influence ==
The pose of the figure has been connected with a figure in one of the woodcut illustrations to Hypnerotomachia Poliphili of 1499, but a nude of this size, as a single subject, was unprecedented in Western painting, and to a large extent determined the treatment of the type for centuries to come, excluding, for example, the more explicit treatment in the contemporary engravings of Giovanni Battista Palumba. Although prints had contained many more nude female figures, the two famous paintings of Botticelli, the Birth of Venus and the Primavera, are the closest precedents in painting. The contemplative attitude toward nature and beauty of the figure is typical of Giorgione.

The composition of this painting was highly influential, despite very public display of such images often being restricted for some centuries. The influence of this painting or paintings it influenced can be traced in a number of later reclining nudes such as the Pardo Venus and Venus of Urbino of Titian, the Rokeby Venus of Velázquez, Goya's teasing La maja desnuda, and Olympia by Manet, and other works by Ingres and Rubens, to name but a few.

Reclining female nudes in Western art (1520–1900)

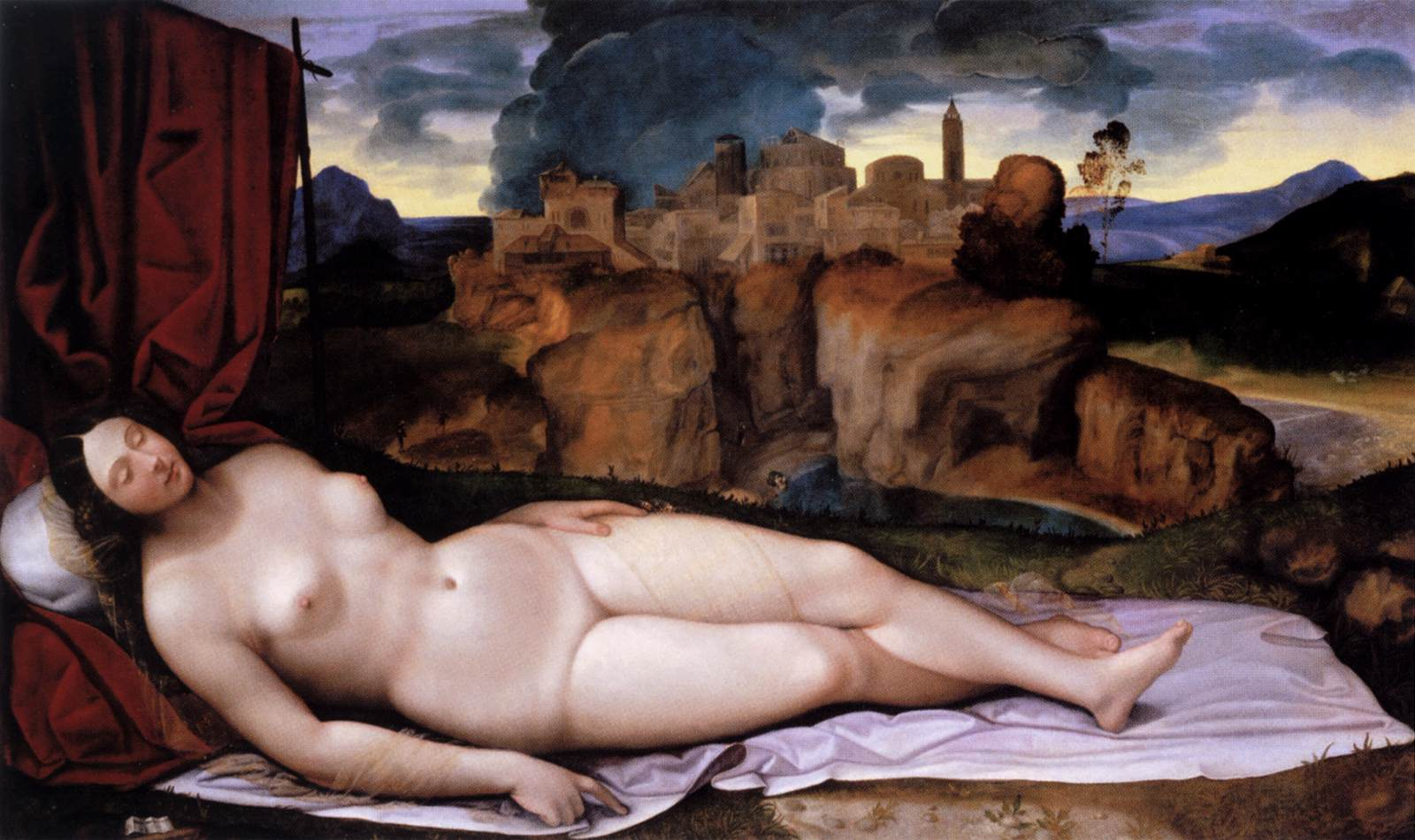
Girolamo da Treviso, 1520

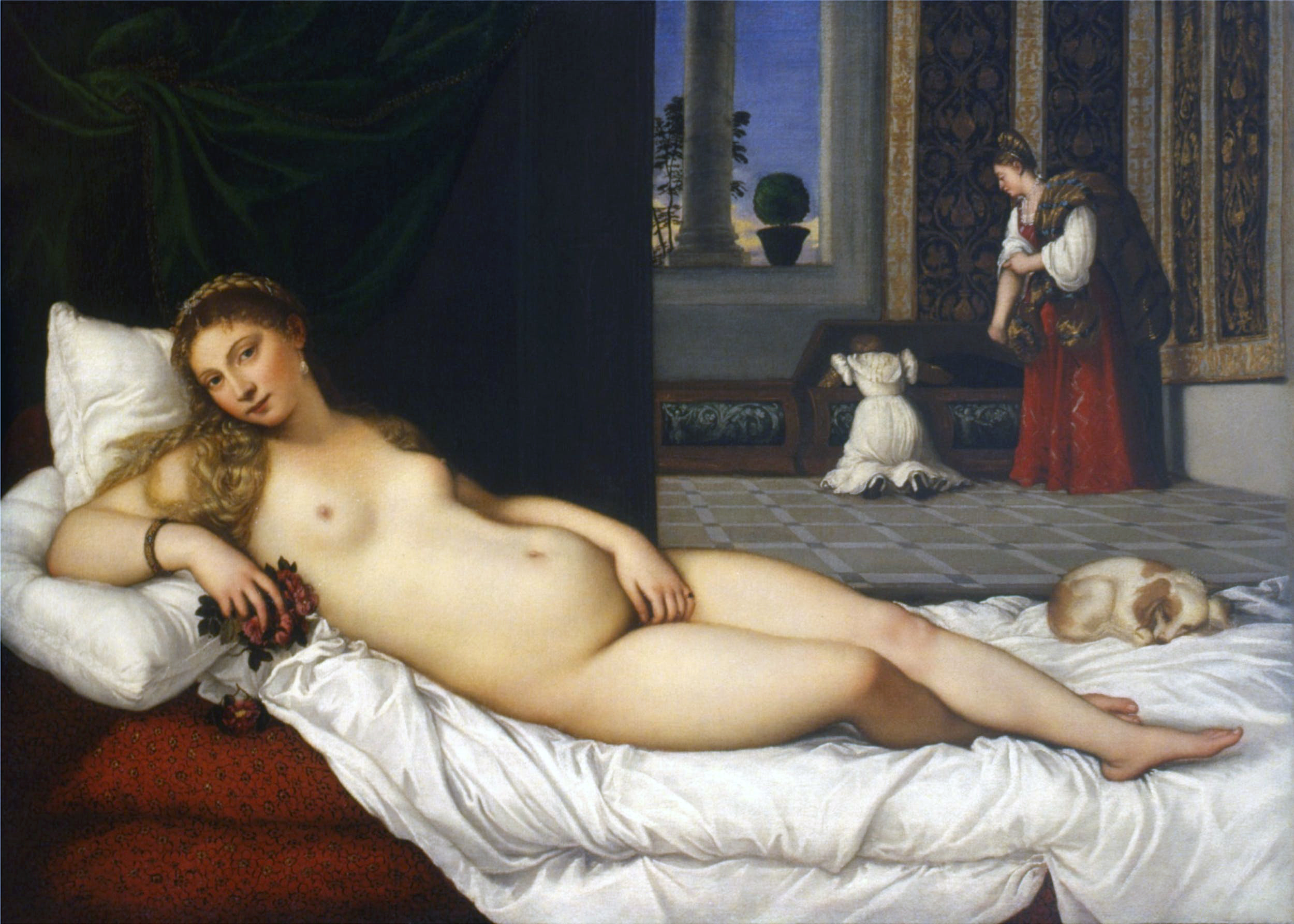
Titian, 1534

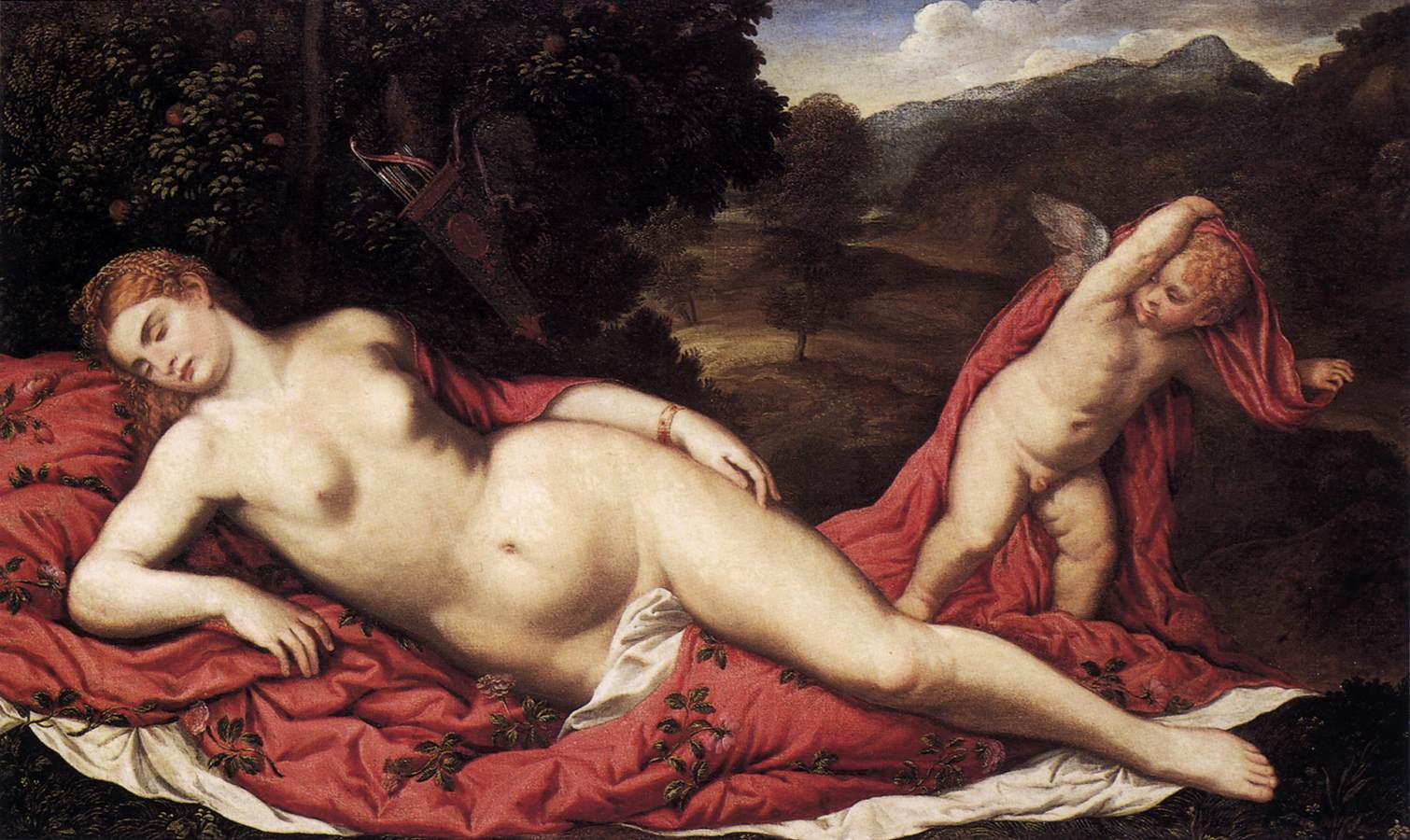
Bordone, 1540

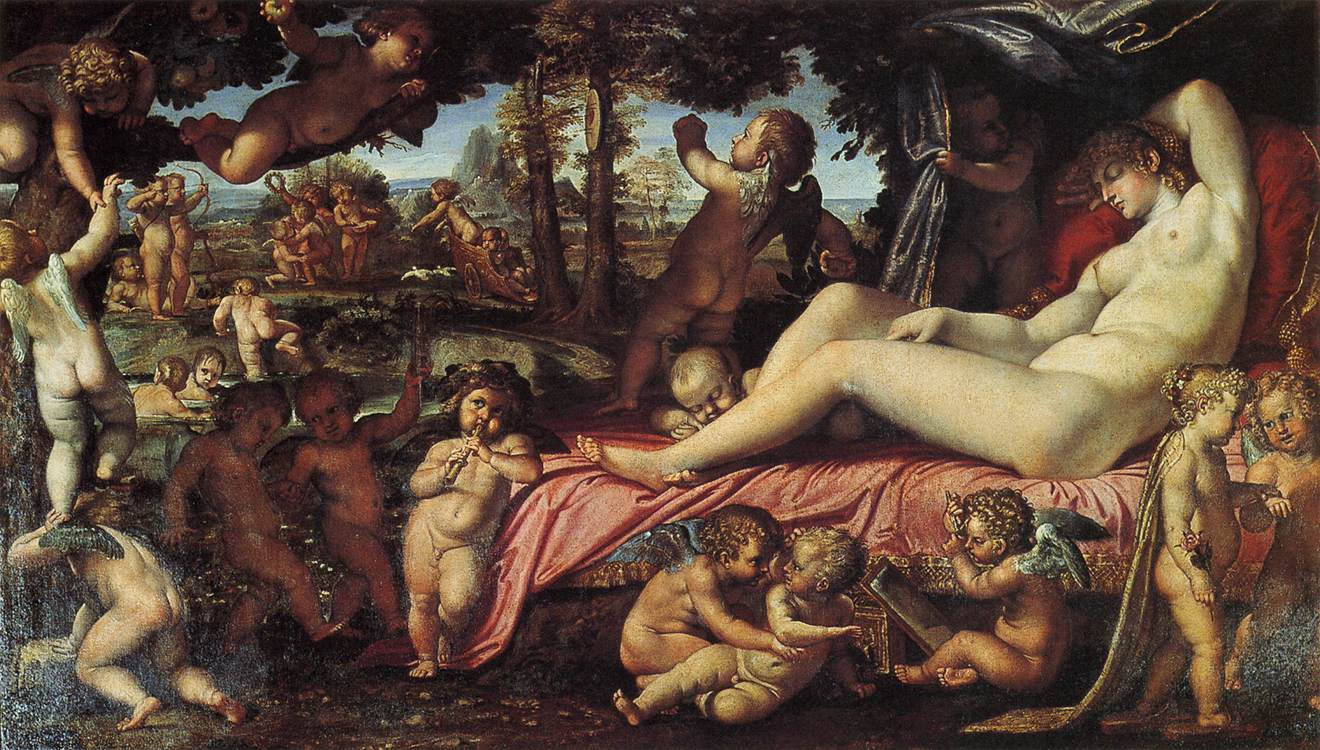
Annibale Carracci, 1602

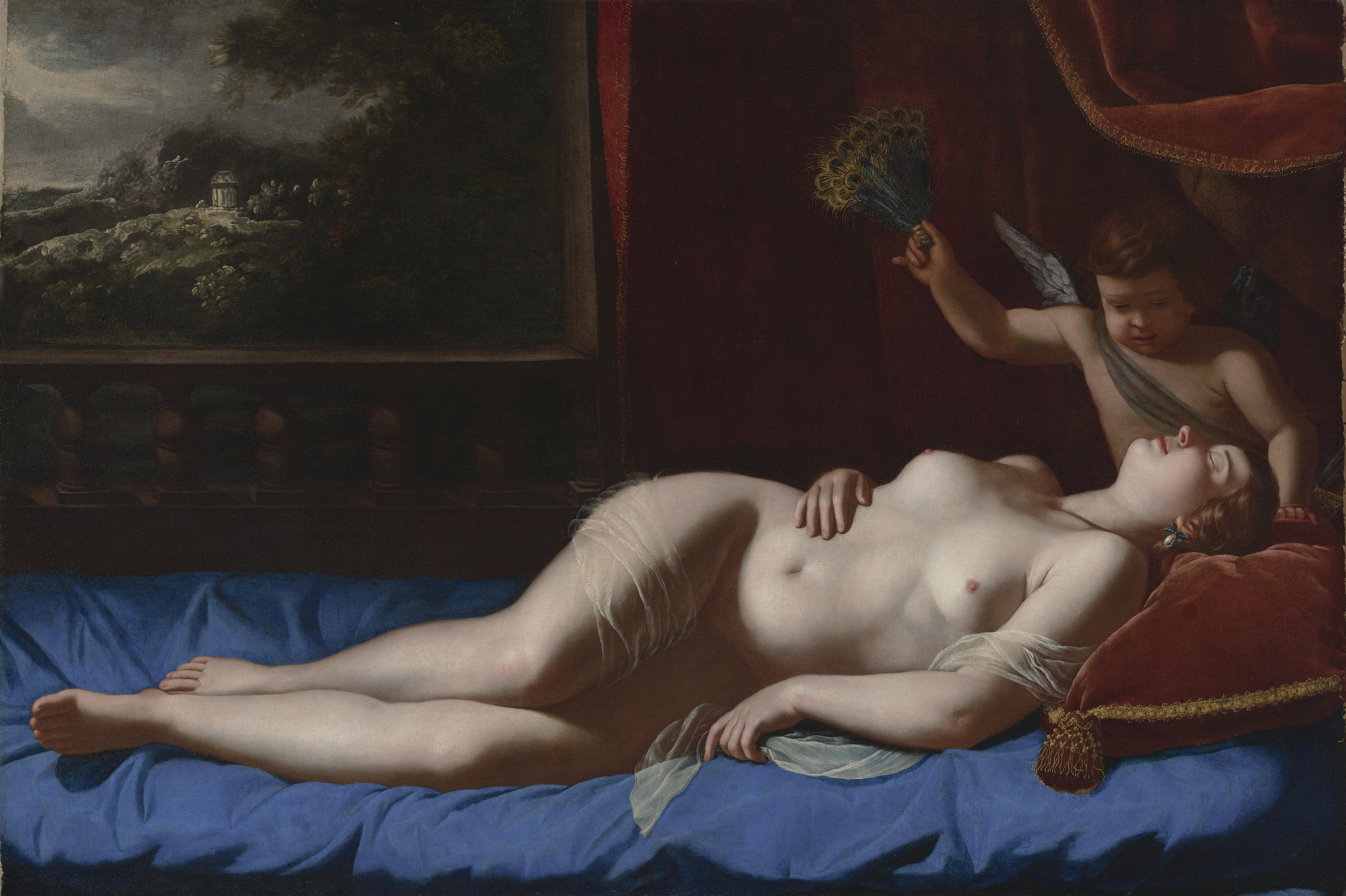
Artemisia Gentileschi, 1625

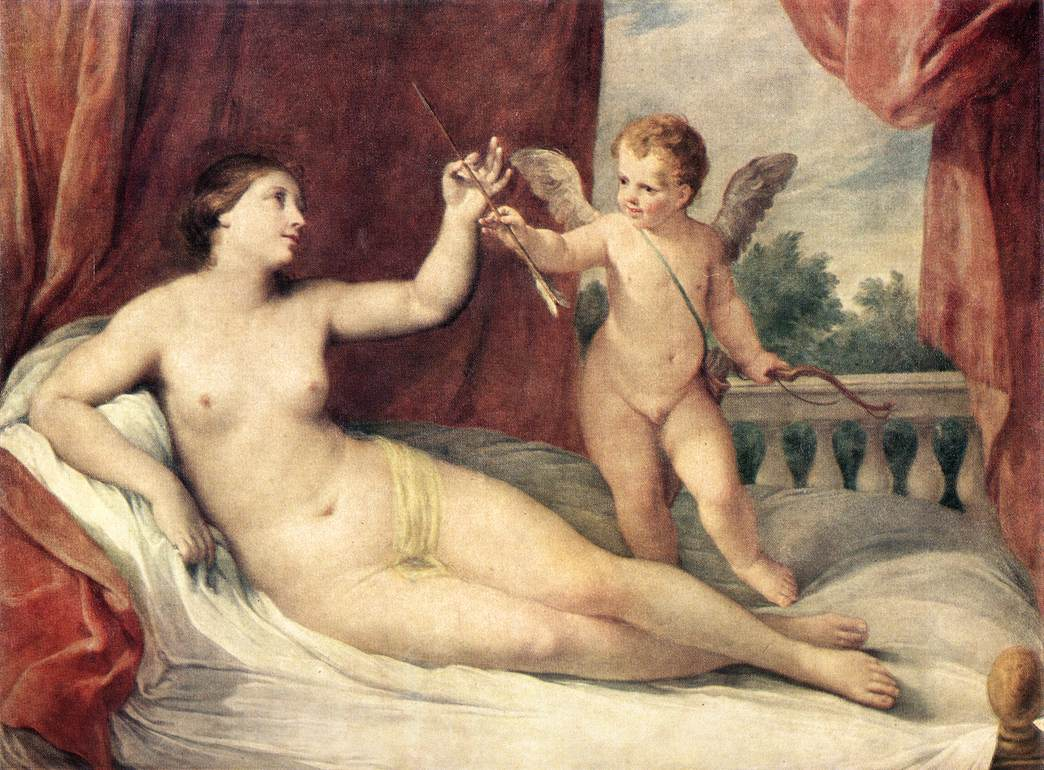
Reni, 1639

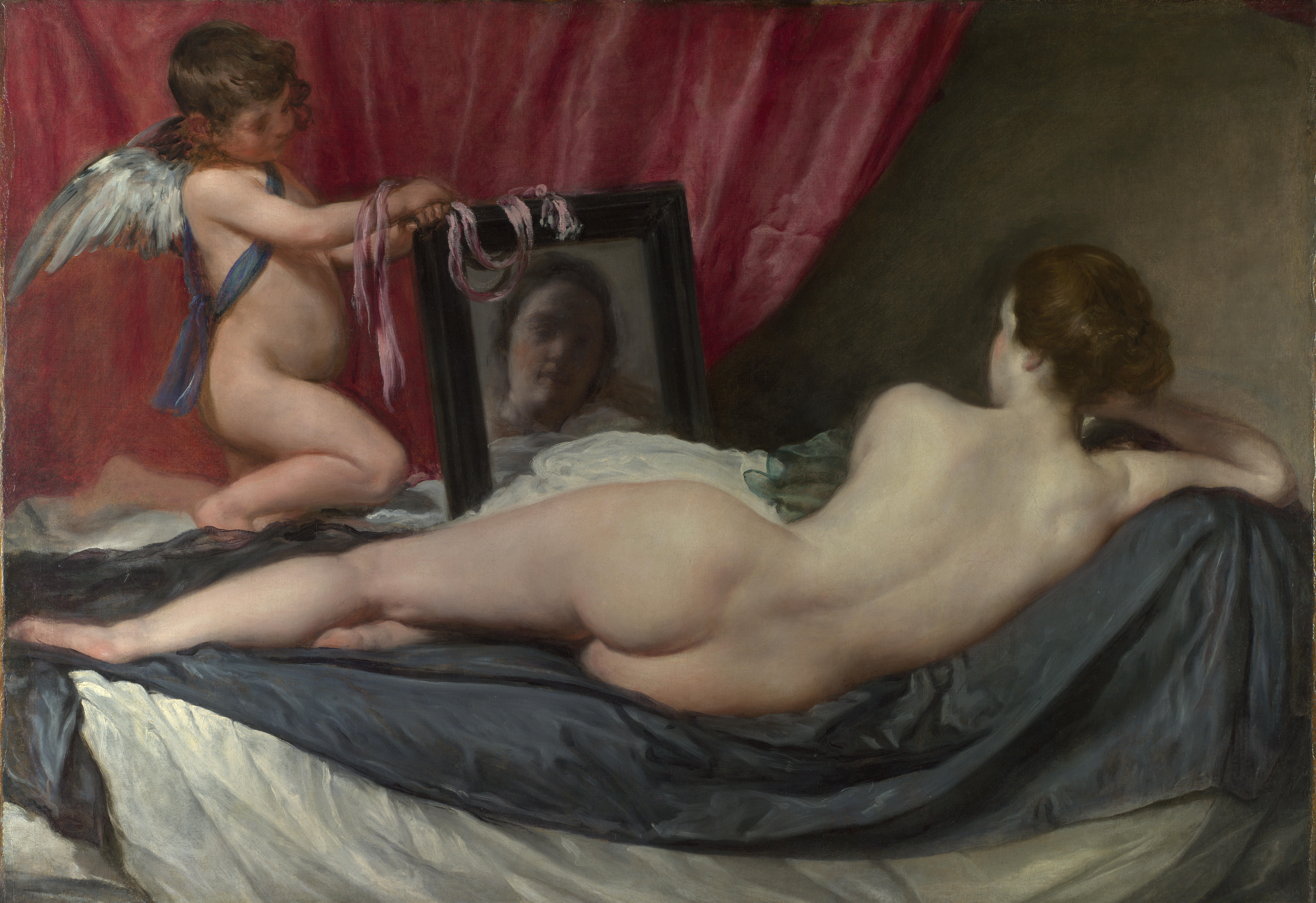
Velázquez, c. 1650

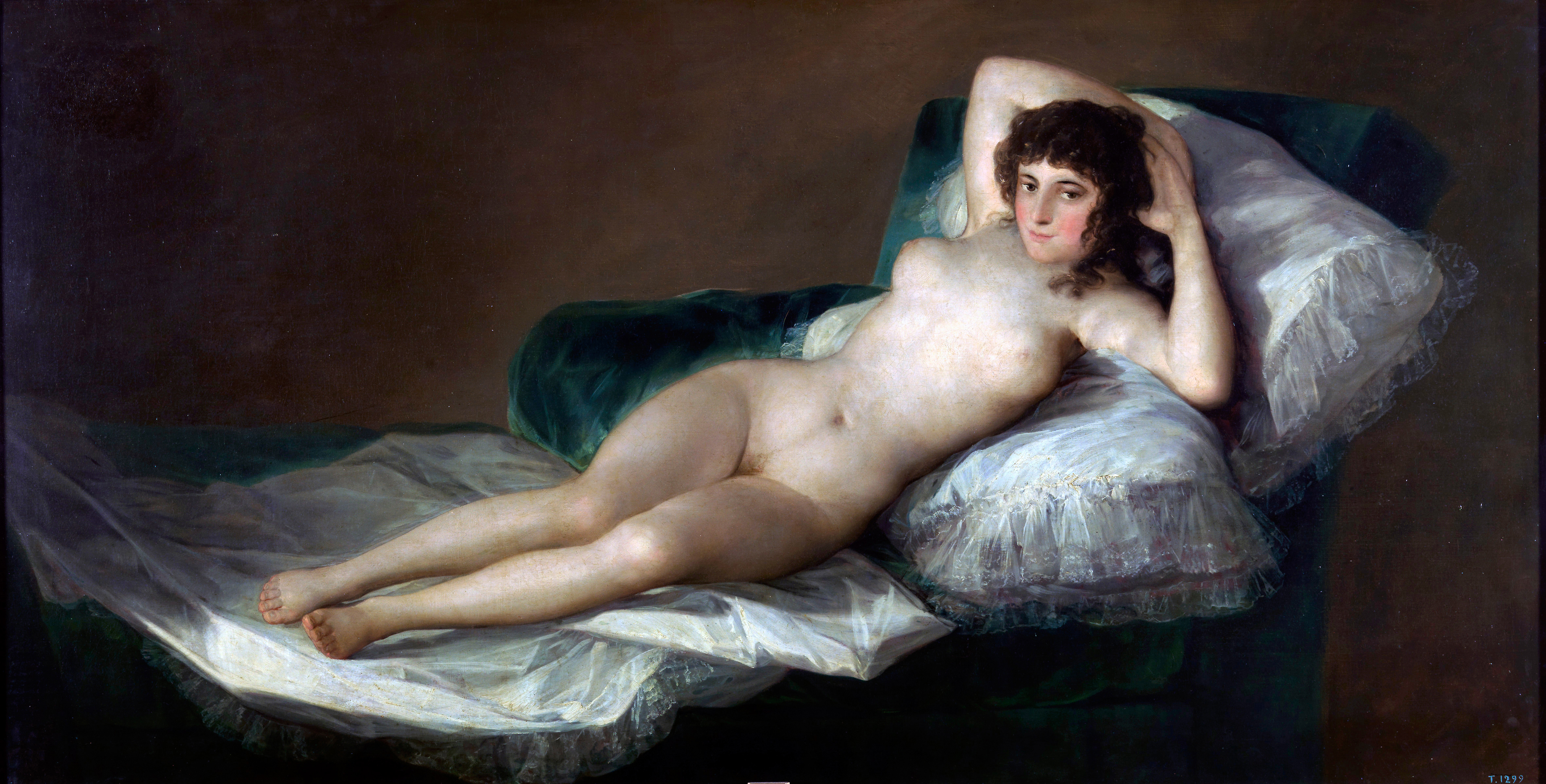
Goya,1792

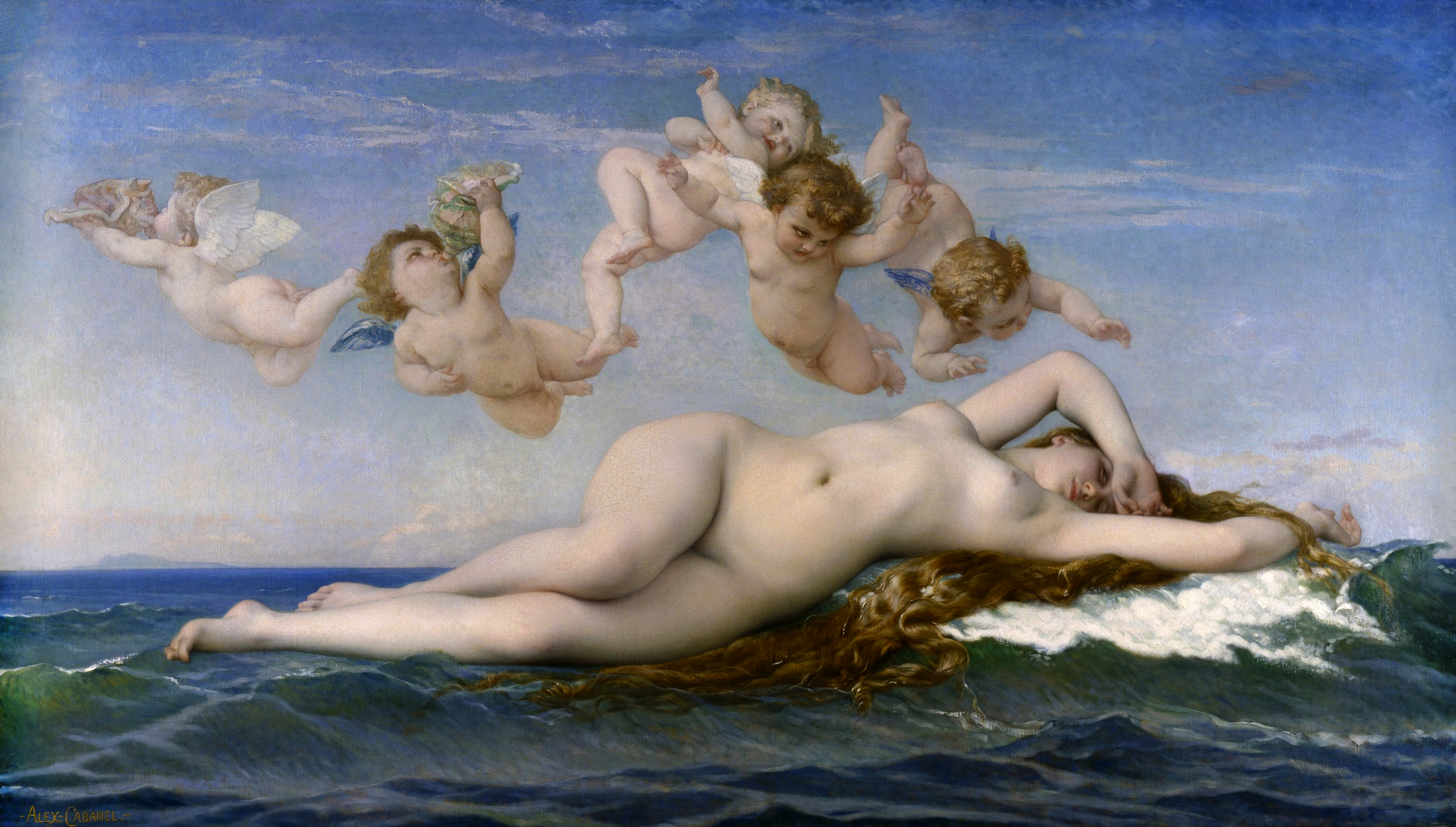
Cabanel, 1863

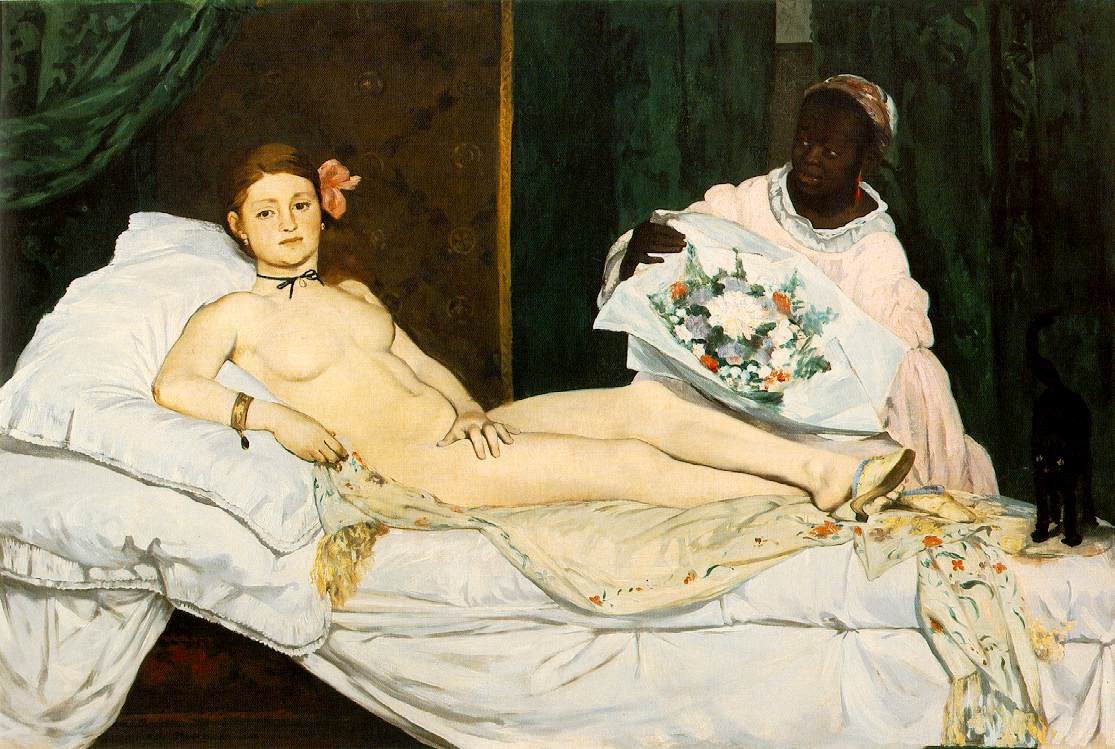
Manet, 1863

== See also ==
- 100 Great Paintings, 1980 BBC series
- List of works by Titian
