= Venus and Musician =

Painting by Titian

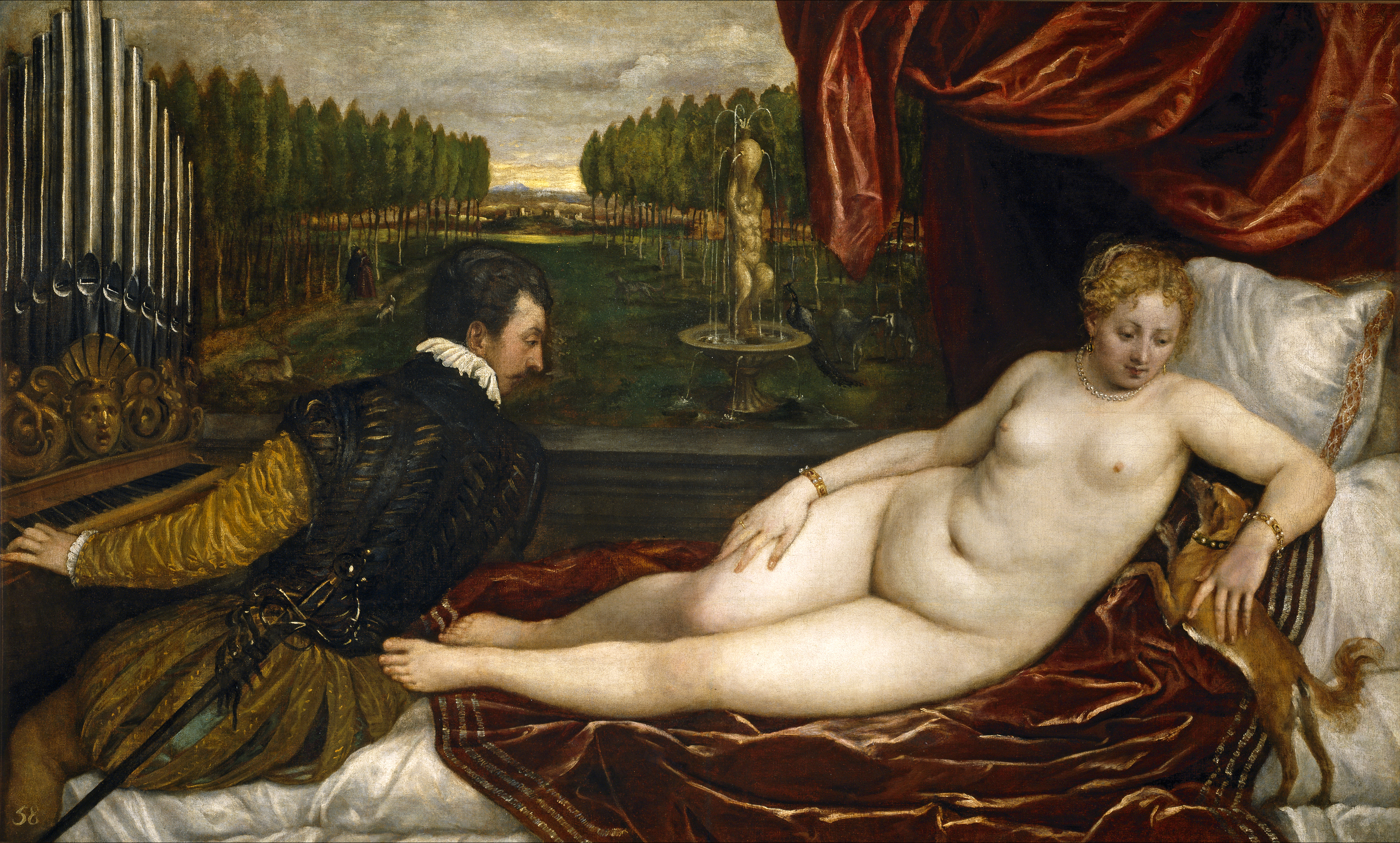
Venus and Musician or Venus with an Organist and a Dog, Prado, c. 1550

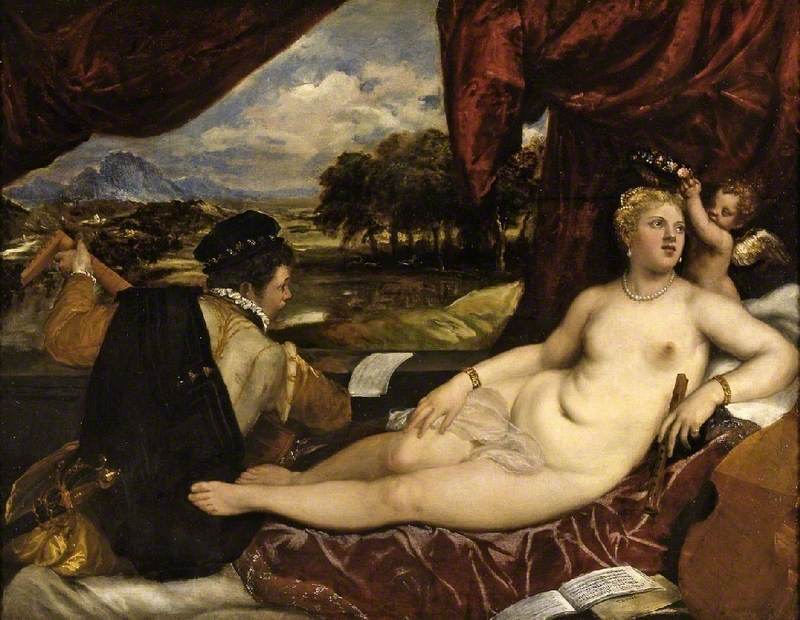
Fitzwilliam Museum, Cambridge, with lute-player and Cupid, c. 1555–65

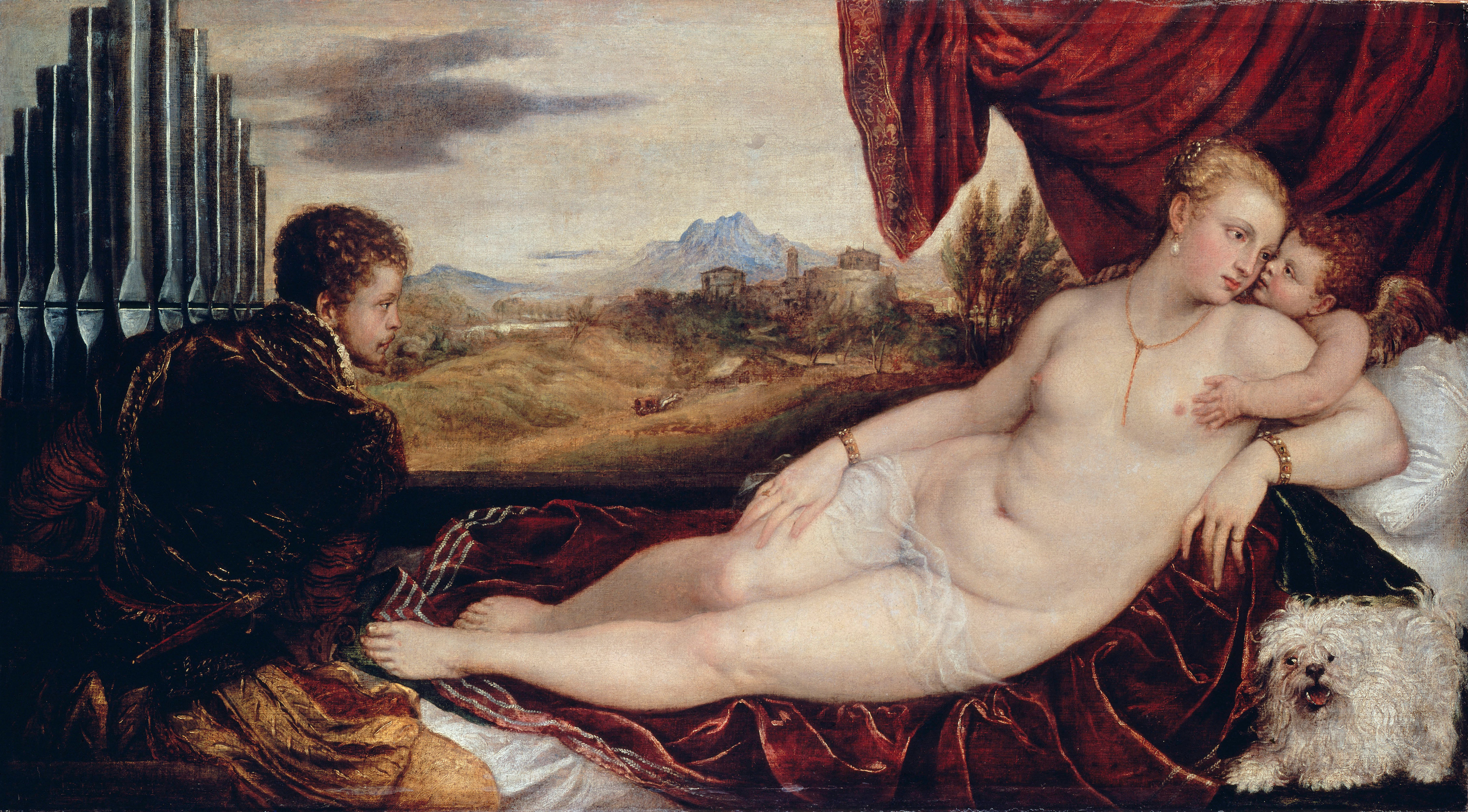
Gemäldegalerie Berlin, organist, dog and Cupid, 115 x 210 cm

Venus and Musician refers to a series of paintings by the Venetian Renaissance painter Titian and his workshop.

Titian's workshop produced many versions of Venus and Musician, which may be known by various other titles specifying the elements, such as Venus with an Organist, Venus with a Lute-player, and so on. Most versions have a man playing a small organ on the left, but in others a lute is being played. Venus has a small companion on her pillows, sometimes a Cupid and in other versions a dog, or in Berlin both. The paintings are thought to date from the late 1540s onwards.

Many of Titian's paintings exist in several versions, especially his nude mythological subjects. Later versions tend to be mostly or entirely by his workshop, with the degree of Titian's personal contribution uncertain and the subject of differing views. All the versions of the Venus and Musician are in oil on canvas, and fall into two proportions and sizes, with two of the organist versions wider.

The five versions generally regarded as at least largely by Titian are, with an organist, the two in Madrid and one in Berlin, and with a lutenist those in Cambridge and New York. Another version in the Uffizi in Florence is less highly regarded, and has no musician, but a Cupid, as well as a black and white dog at the foot of the bed, eyeing a partridge on the parapet.

In all the versions Venus' bed appears to be set in a loggia or against a large open window with a low stone wall or parapet. Venus is shown at full-length, reclining on pillows. The musician sits on the end of the bed with his back to her, but is turned round to look towards her. By contrast she looks away to the right. He wears contemporary 16th-century dress, as do any small figures in the landscape backgrounds, and has a sword or dagger at his belt. A large red drape takes up the top left corner, and the top right corner in the less wide versions. There is a wide landscape outside, falling into two types. The two Prado versions show avenues of trees and a fountain in what seems to be the gardens of a palace. The other versions have a more open landscape, leading to distant mountains.

== Titian's reclining nudes ==
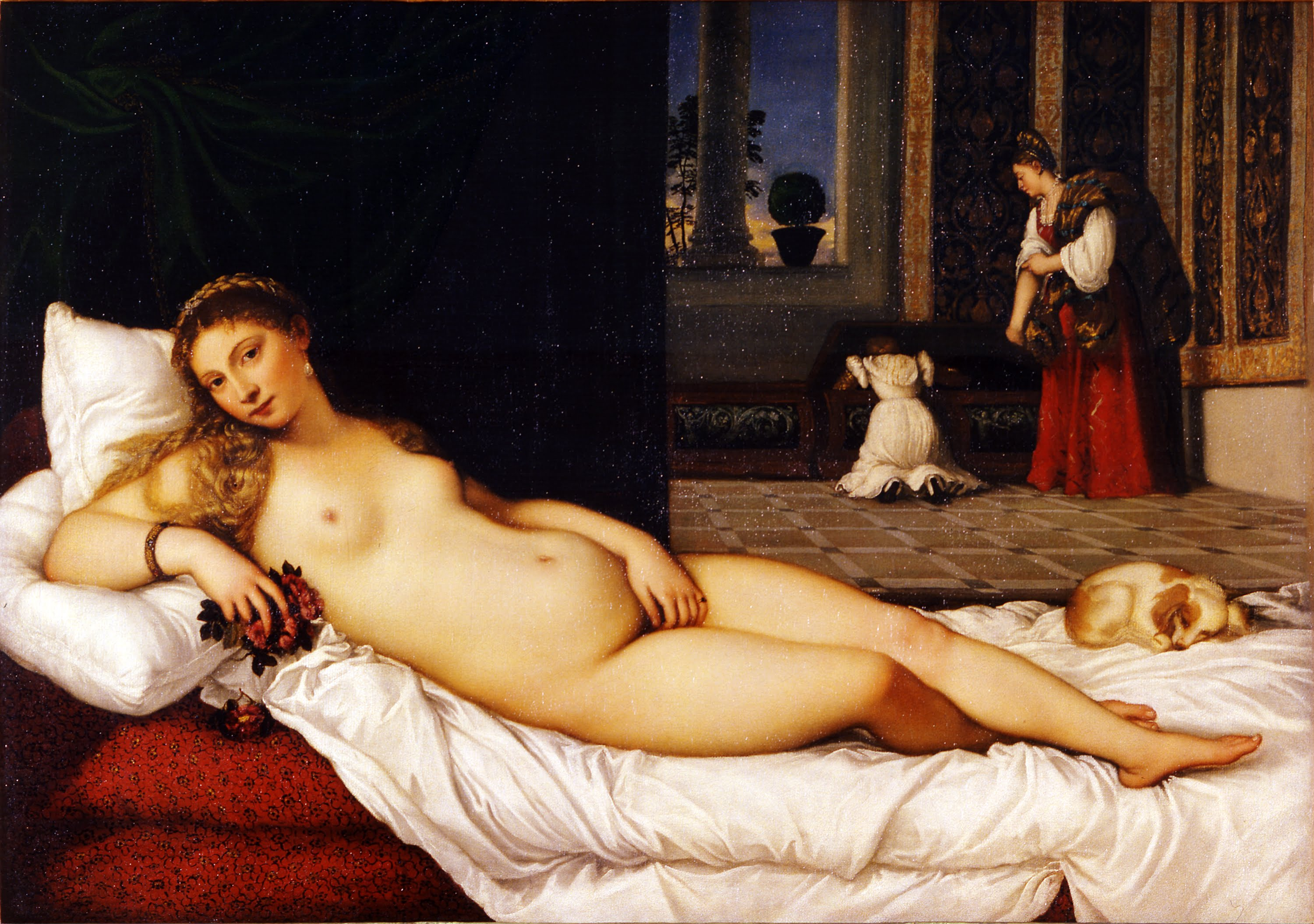
Titian's Venus of Urbino, c. 1534, Uffizi, largely the same pose in reverse

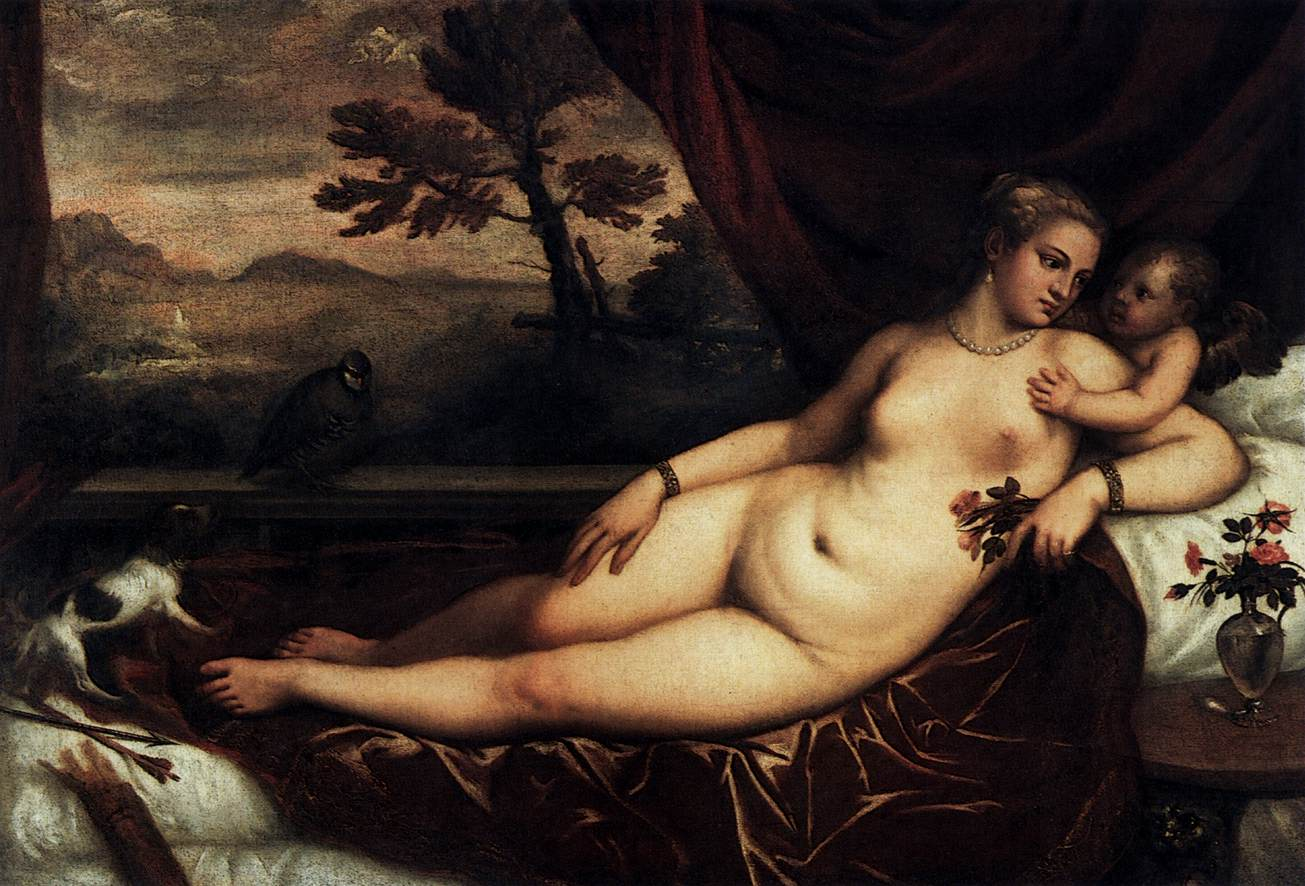
Venus and Cupid with Dog and Partridge, mostly Titian's workshop, c. 1555, Uffizi

The painting is the final development of Titian's compositions with a reclining female nude in the Venetian style. After Giorgione's death in 1510 Titian had completed his Dresden Venus, and then around 1534 had painted the Venus of Urbino. A repetition of this from 1545, perhaps a lost recorded Venus sent to Charles V, "was the basis" for the Venus and Musician series. Unlike these, the Cupid in most versions of Venus and Musician does allow a clear identification of the female as Venus, despite the modern decor.

Otherwise the painting falls into the category showing courtesans, though these are also often described as "Venus", if only to retain some propriety. In all an unembarrassed Venus is completely naked, except for a gauzy cloth over her crotch in some versions, but wears several pieces of very expensive jewellery, typical aspects of courtesan pictures. The musician is smartly dressed, and carries a blade weapon, in several versions a large sword with gilded fittings. He could be taken as the client of an expensive Venetian courtesan.

Other reclining nudes are the Pardo Venus (or Jupiter and Antiope, now in the Louvre), "that laboured attempt to recapture his early style", from the mid-1540s. A more original composition and physique, also begun in the mid-1540s, but with versions painted in the 1550s and perhaps 1560s, is used in the series of Danaë paintings, which Kenneth Clark sees as Titian adopting the conventions for the nude prevailing outside Venice; "in the rest of Italy bodies of an entirely different shape had long been fashionable".

For Clark, the Venus of the Venus and Musician versions, where the head changes direction but the body remains exactly the same, is "entirely Venetian, younger sister of all those expensive ladies whom Palma Vecchio, Paris Bordone, and Bonifazio painted for local consumption." The nude figures are "rich, heavy and a trifle coarse ... the Venuses of this series are not provocative. The almost brutal directness with which their bodies are presented to us makes them, now that their delicate texture has been removed by restoration, singularly un-aphrodisiac. Moreover, they are far more conventionalized than is evident at first sight."

== Allegory? ==
The erotic appeal of the subject is evident, but some critics have argued for a more allegorical meaning to do with the appreciation of beauty through both the eyes and ears, and the superiority of the former. Whereas the two Prado organists still seem to be playing, with one hand on the keyboard in the first version, and two in the second, the Berlin organist has abandoned playing to gaze at Venus, a point given great significance by Erwin Panofsky, as representing the "triumph of the sense of sight over the sense of hearing". The depiction of the organs has been criticized by organ scholars: "The pipes are too squat, and if they sounded at all would produce a tubby, inelegant wallowing".

The lutenists are able to turn their instruments along with their body, and both seem to continue playing. According to Panofsky, this "means that a musician interrupted in the act of making music by the sight of visual beauty embodied in Venus has been transformed into a musician doing homage to the visual beauty embodied in Venus by the very act of making music. It is difficult to play the organ and to admire a beautiful woman at the same time; but it is easy to serenade her, as it were, to the accompaniment of a lute, while giving full attention to her charms."

The 20th-century fashion for explaining paintings with reference to the subtle doctrines of Renaissance Neoplatonism reached the series, although in the case of Titian there is even more resistance than usual to such explanations. Edgar Wind noted a pictorial convention, seen also in the Pastoral Concert and other works, where divine figures are nude, but mortals clothed. In the Musician paintings "the disparity between mortal and goddess is heightened by a paradox of posture. While the courtier plays music under the inspiration of love ... he does not face the goddess directly, but turns his head over his shoulder to look back at her; he thus enacts the Platonic ἐπιστροφἠ, the reversal of vision by which alone a mortal can hope to face transcendent Beauty". Nonetheless, Wind later describes the composition as "a somewhat tiresome show-piece".

Although there is no inevitable contradiction between an allegorical interpretation and a more straightforward decorative and erotic one, more recent scholars have often rejected or at least played down the allegorical interpretation. Ulrich Middeldorf, in 1947, began the reaction: "The main figures in Titian's Sacred and Profane Love (Galleria Borghese, Rome) possess a dignity and purity that make any high-flung interpretation of the picture seem acceptable. It is quite a unique picture, which we can well imagine as painted to suit the elevated tastes of an extremely refined person. The character of Titian's later Venuses and Danaes, however, seems to place them on an infinitely lower level. They are beautiful, but vulgar in comparison to the Sacred and Profane Love. Also the fact that they were produced in an extraordinary number of replicas does not encourage an attempt to look in them for purity of thought . . . . In brief, the suspicion can hardly be avoided that these pictures were rather 'ornamental furniture' than profound philosophical treatises. And the rooms which they . . . were supposed to decorate, were bedrooms."

== The Prado's two versions ==
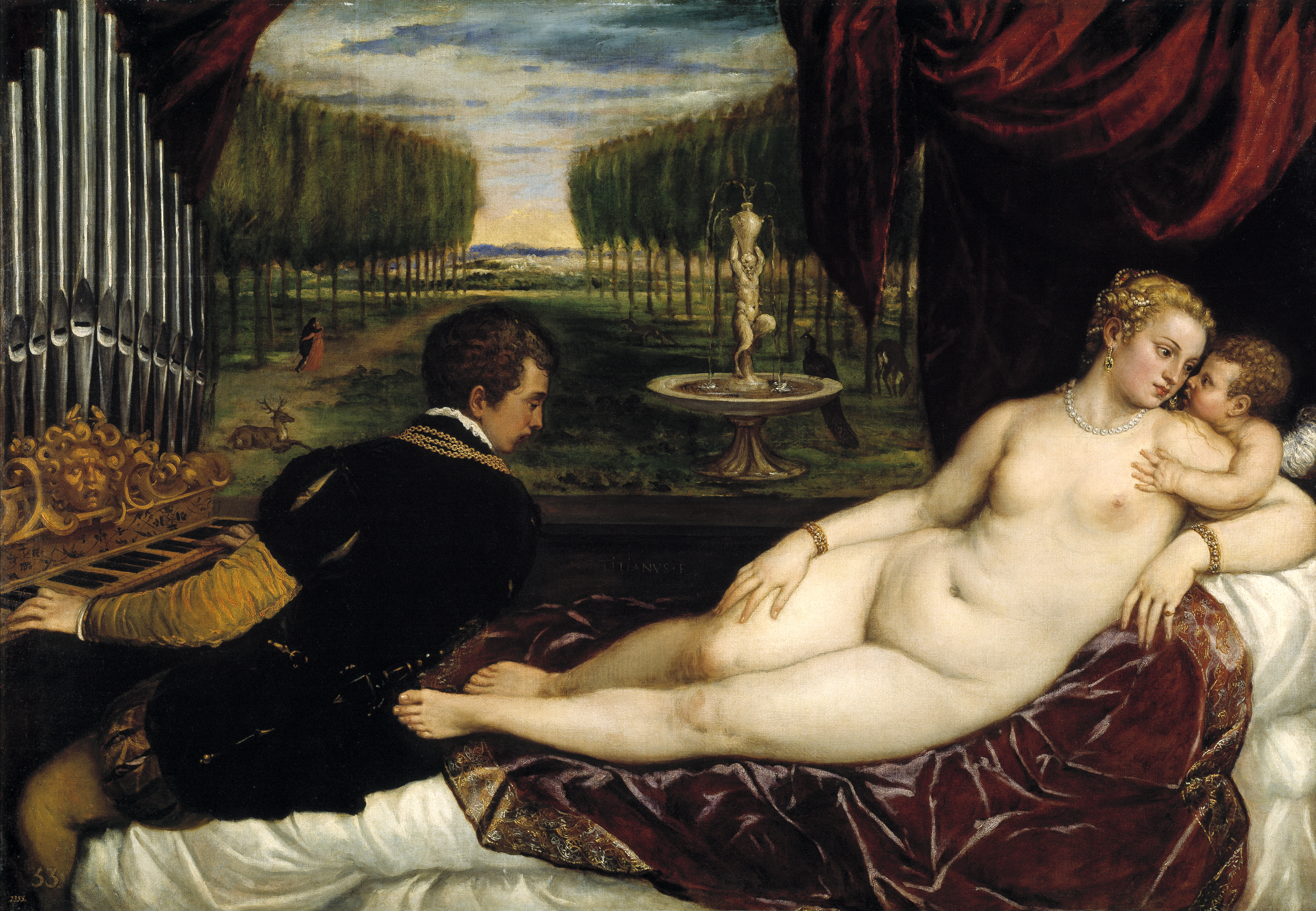
The Prado's second version, with a cupid, c. 1555

The earliest record of a version of the composition is one with an organist known to have been painted for Charles V, Holy Roman Emperor when Titian was in Augsburg in 1548, which the emperor then gave to his minister, Cardinal Granvelle. But it is not certain which this is, though both versions in the Museo del Prado in Madrid have been asserted to be it, especially the Venus with an Organist and Dog, the wider of the two (148 x 217 cm; this is Prado 420). This is now thought by the Prado to date to about 1550, so ruling it out of being the original Cardinal Granvelle picture, which was the usual opinion until the Prado revised its date recently. It has a dog and is the only version discussed here with no Cupid. Following the Prado's redating, the version given by Charles V to Granvelle is regarded as missing, and presumed lost.

Although lacking Venus' attribute of Cupid, the painting is always recorded as showing the goddess. Unlike other versions, it is thought that the painting may celebrate a marriage. The woman wears a wedding ring and has none of the traditional attributes of Venus. Compared to other Venuses by Titian, she is not accompanied by a Cupid and "it is the only one in which both figures have individualised features".

Radiography reveals that Titian made alterations during the painting's execution. Originally the work was more daring; Venus lay uninhibitedly with her gaze fixed on the musician, which none of the versions discussed here have. Probably the client or the artist thought that the arrangement was too provocative, so Venus' head was turned, and a lap dog added to give her something to look at, and also touch, so reinforcing any allegory of the senses that might be intended. Venus is now given a more passive role.

It belonged to a lawyer called Francesco Assonica, who was used professionally by Titian and is mentioned as a friend of the artist, and had other Titians. Possibly it was painted for him. It remained in Venice until the 1620s, and was sketched there by Anthony van Dyck, and probably in connection with him acquired for the collection of Charles I of England. After his execution it was bought for £165 by Colonel John Hutchinson at the sale of Charles' art in 1649. The same day Hutchinson paid £600 for Titian's Pardo Venus, or Jupiter and Antiope. In 1651/52 it was bought for £600 by David Teniers the Younger as agent for the Habsburgs, and sent to Madrid for the Spanish royal collection, where it remained before the collection was transferred to the Prado. A number of copies were made during the painting's time in England, and the Royal Collection had one by the time of Charles II of England, which is possibly the good copy they still have.

The Prado's other version, Venus with an Organist and Cupid, (148 x 217 cm, Prado 421, signed "TITIANUS F.") with a Cupid rather than a dog, has been thought by some to date from 1547 to 1548, but they currently date it to c. 1555. Miguel Falomir says that recent x-ray and infra-red reflectography make it clear that this was traced from the other Prado version (though they were not re-united again in the Spanish royal collection for over a century). Titian and his studio often used tracing of the main elements to make replica versions.

This too used to be thought to be Charles V and Granvelle's version from 1648, which the current dating would rule out, if correct. It has been in the Spanish royal collection since at least 1626, when Cassiano del Pozzo recorded it in Madrid, and features in later inventories. It was thought that it was one of Granvelle's painting bought (through imperial arm-twisting) by Rudolf II, Holy Roman Emperor from Ganvelle's heirs in 1600, and was later given to Philip III of Spain. Hugh Trevor-Roper thought that the organist "has the features of Philip [II]", but this seems to be a minority view among recent sources; the Berlin version has also been thought to show him; Penny draws attention to the variable quality of the Berlin version, and calls the painting of the head "superb", where the drapery is "dull", the organ "routine", but the dog "an inspiration".

== Lutenist versions ==
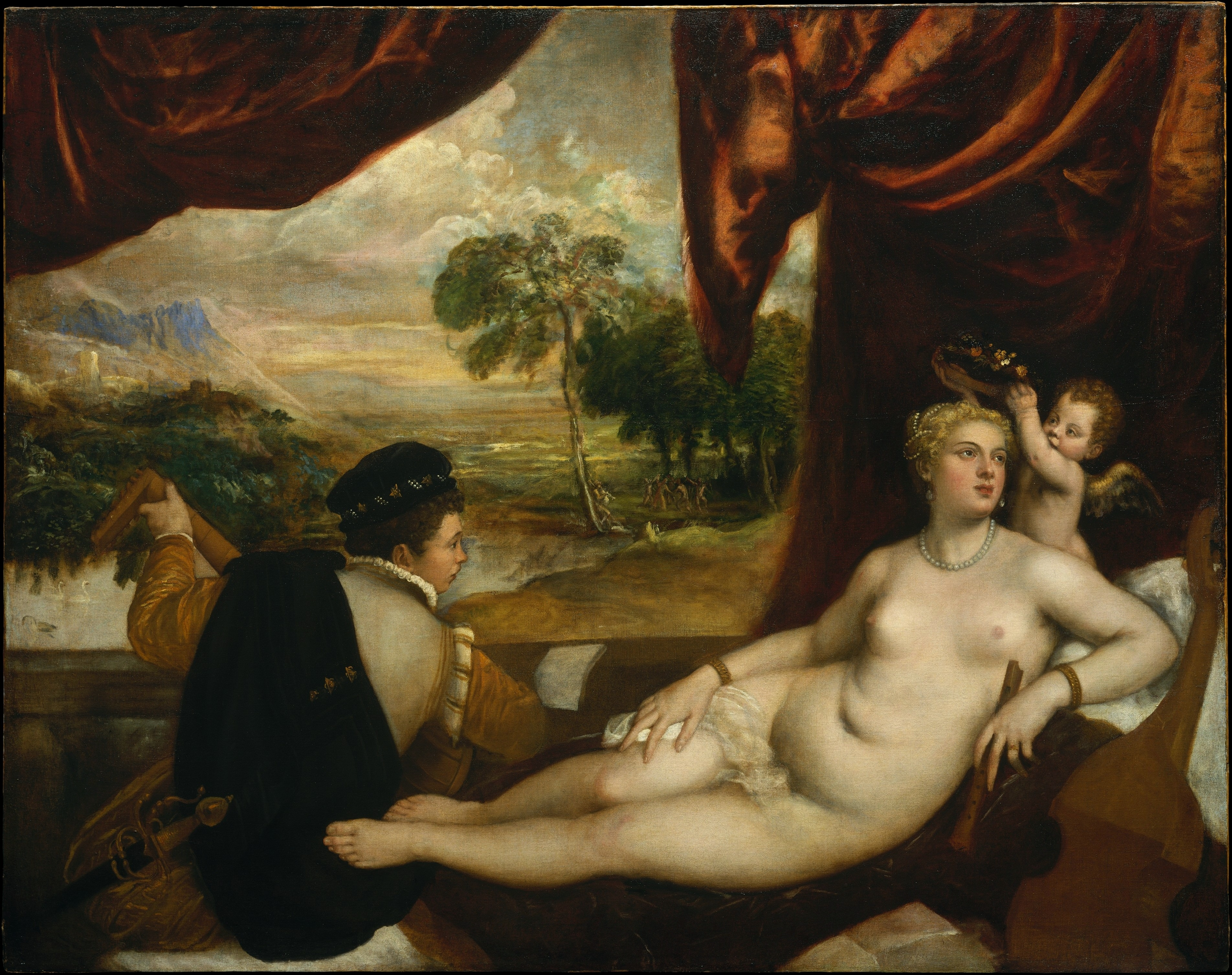
Venus with an Lutenist, c. 1565–70, Metropolitan Museum of Art, New York

The two main versions of Venus and Cupid with a Lute-player are similar in all but details. The one in the Fitzwilliam Museum in Cambridge is the earlier, dated by the museum to 1555–65, measuring 150.5 x 196.8 cm, and attributed just to Titian. It probably belonged to Rudolf II, Holy Roman Emperor, and was certainly in the Imperial Collection in Prague by 1621. It then followed the path of the best of this collection: looted by the Swedes in 1648, taken to Rome by Christina, Queen of Sweden when she abdicated, sold to the Orleans Collection after her death, and finally auctioned in London after the French Revolution. It was bought by Richard FitzWilliam, 7th Viscount FitzWilliam in 1798/99, whose bequest of his collections at his death in 1816 founded the museum.

The Metropolitan Museum of Art dates its version, which it calls Venus and the Lute Player, to c. 1565–70 (65 x 82 1/2 inches/165.1 x 209.6 cm), and attributes it to Titian and his workshop. It has been traced from the Cambridge version, and there may well have been a cartoon or a "studio version" for copying kept in Venice. It may have been kept in the studio for many years, being worked on sporadically, as the landscape, which is of high quality, "painted with speed and authority in Titian's freest style", seems to match his style of about 1560, but other parts do not. Possibly it was unfinished at Titian's death in 1576, and then "following his death, certain parts such as Venus's face and hands were brought to a much higher degree of finish", and some areas left unfinished.

The New York version belonged to members of the royal family of Savoy from at the latest 1624 until some time after 1742. It then came to England and was owned by Thomas Coke, 1st Earl of Leicester (d. 1759) and his heirs until sold to the dealer Joseph Duveen in 1930, who sold it to the museum in 1933. It had been at Holkham Hall in Norfolk, and in older sources may be called the Holkham Venus.

Other versions with a lute-player, perhaps at least from Titian's workshop, are one in Bordeaux, and one destroyed in World War II in Dresden.

== See also ==
- List of works by Titian
