= Pardo Venus =

1551 painting by Titian

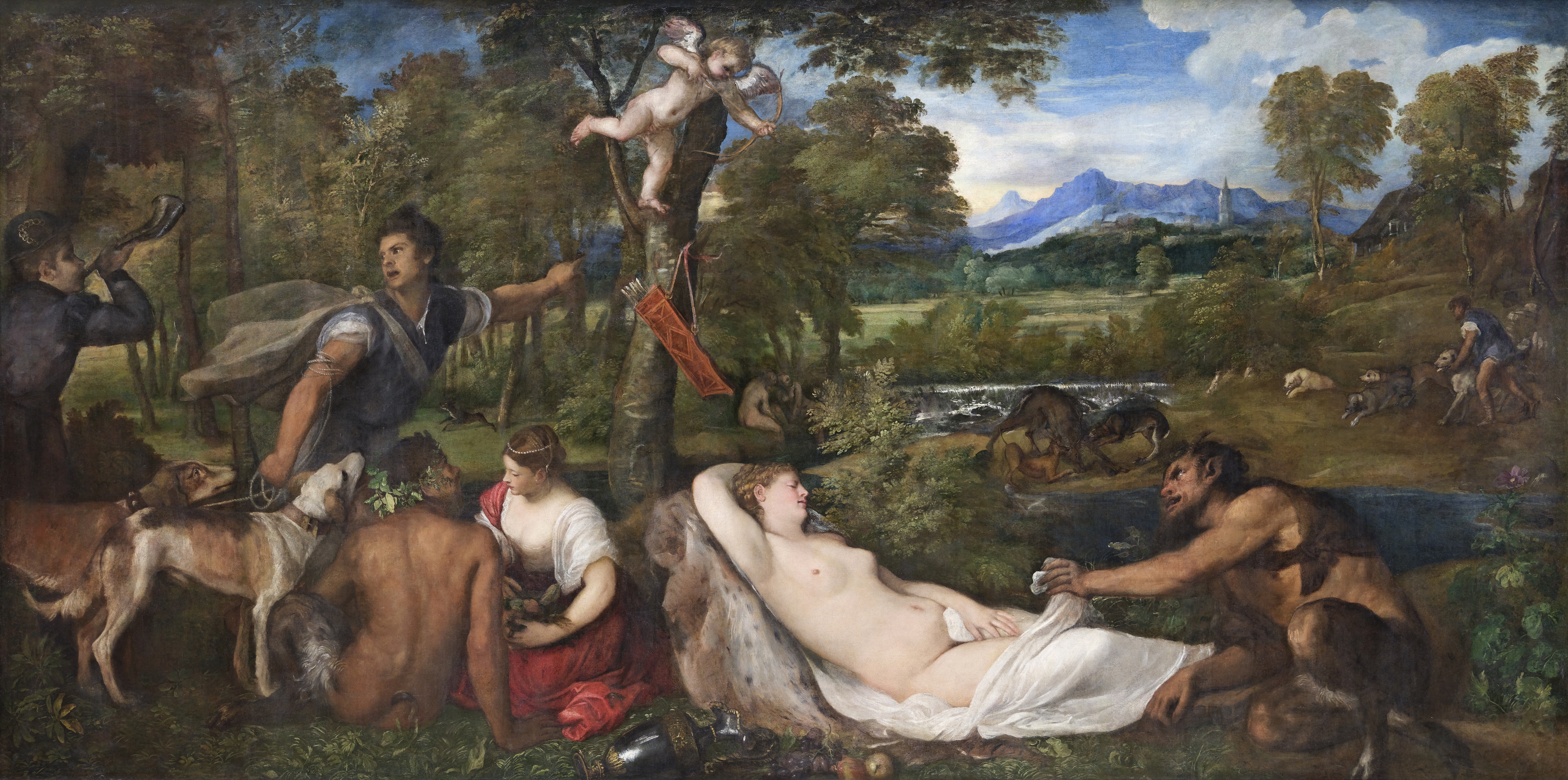
The Pardo Venus, Louvre, 196 x 385 cm

The Pardo Venus is a painting by the Venetian artist Titian, completed in 1551 and now in the Louvre Museum. It is also known as Jupiter and Antiope, since it seems to show the story of Jupiter and Antiope from Book VI of the Metamorphoses (lines 110-111). It is Titian's largest mythological painting, and was the first major mythological painting produced by the artist for Philip II of Spain. It was long kept in the Royal Palace of El Pardo near Madrid (not to be confused with the Prado, a purpose-built museum), hence its usual name; whether Venus is actually represented is uncertain. It later belonged to the English and French royal collections.

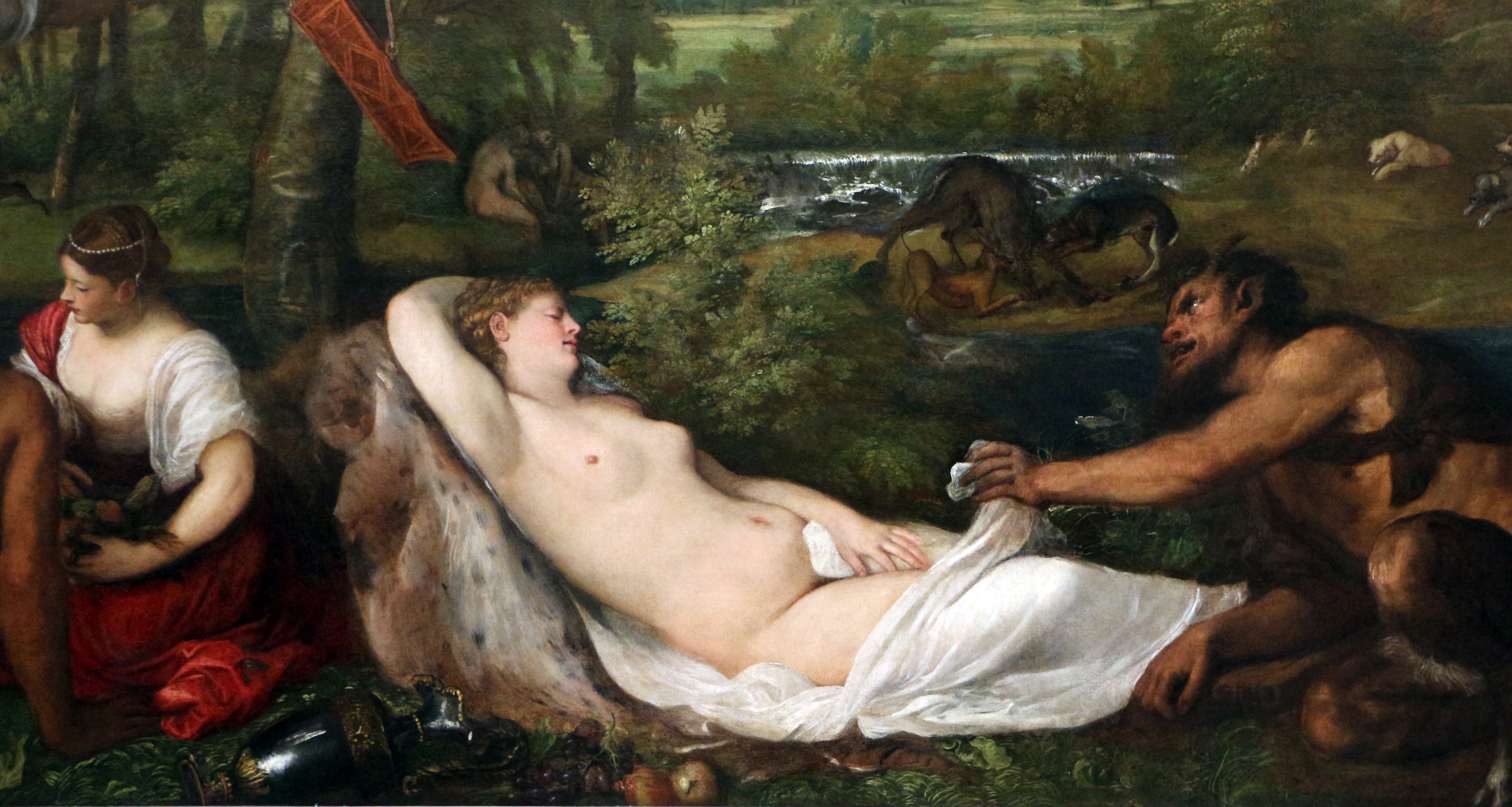
Jupiter and Antiope

Analysis of its style and composition shows that Titian modified a Bacchanalian scene he had begun much earlier in his career by completing the landscape background and adding figures. For Sydney Freedberg it was "probably in substance an invention of the later 1530s, though significantly reworked later; it is full of motifs and ideas that have been recollected from an earlier and more Giorgionesque time, ordered in an obvious and uncomplicated classicizing scheme."

Though, if Antiope is the nude, the painting meets the basic definition of Titian's poesie series, mythological scenes from Ovid painted for Philip II, the painting is typically not counted in the series, either as it was begun well before Titian used the term in a letter to the Spanish King, or because the nude is indeed Venus, in which case no such scene is described by Ovid.

== Venus or Antiope? ==
As to the subject, Titian himself appears to describe it simply as "the landscape", and his son Orazio calls it "the nude woman with the landscape and the satyr", both in letters to Philip II, but later an inventory of El Pardo calls it "Jupiter and Antiope". In Madrid in the 1620s, Vicente Carducho (d. 1638, see below) referred to its subject as "Antiope and some shepherds and satyrs on a large canvas". In the correspondence of the French and Spanish ambassadors as Charles I's collection was being sold in 1649-53, the nude is "Venus". Malcolm Bull observed: "In later inventories the terms "naked woman" and "Venus" are almost interchangeable", and the presence of her son Cupid an uncertain indicator, as he often appears with other people.

== Description ==
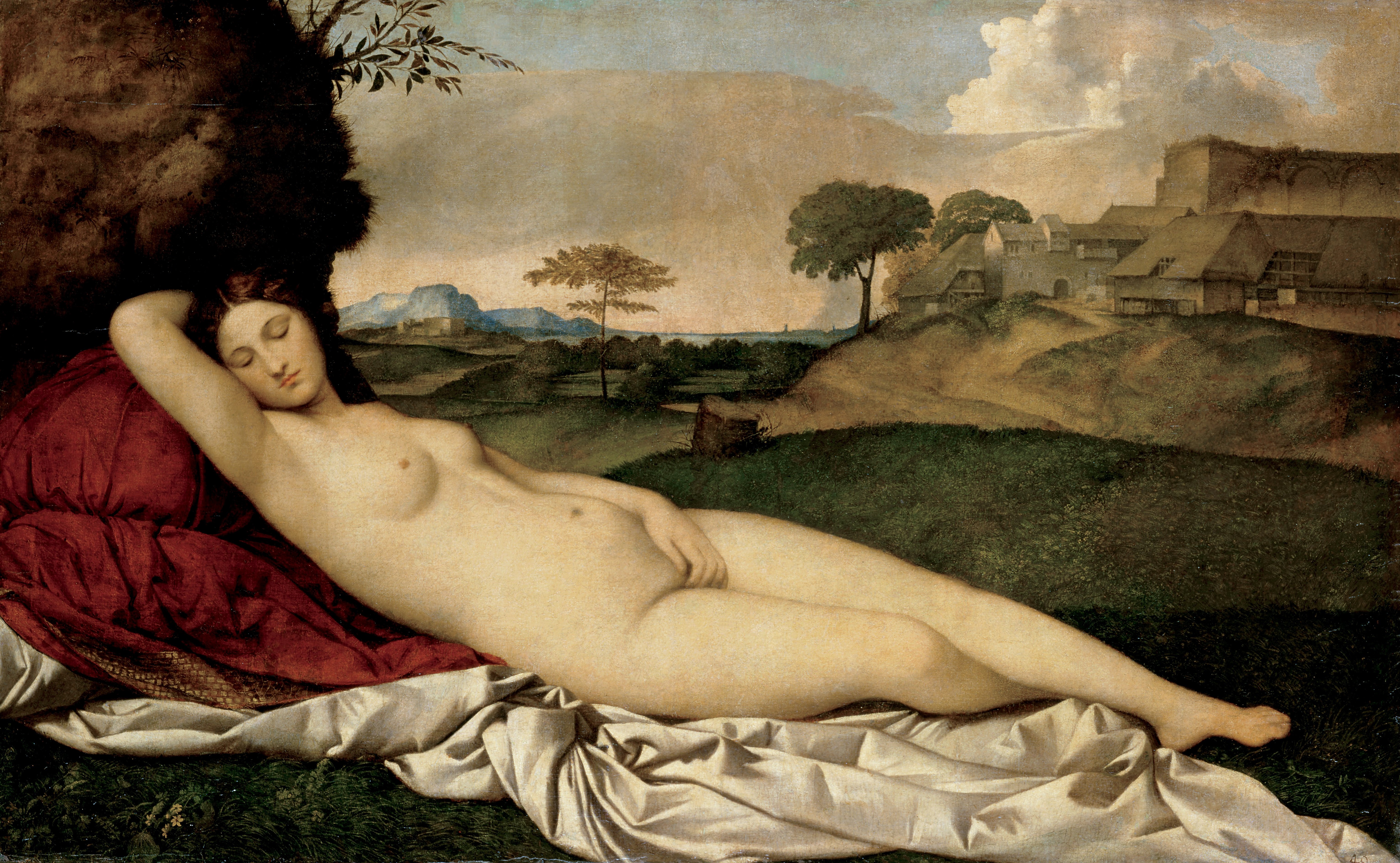
Giorgione's Dresden Venus, completed by Titian, c. 1510

The painting is very large, and the figures somewhat disconnected, the composition divided into two by the tree at centre. In the right foreground we have a scene that would have been familiar to well-educated Renaissance viewers as Jupiter, having taken the form of a satyr, creeping up on the sleeping nymph Antiope, and lifting her drapery to view her naked. He will shortly rape her. Possibly the situation is only borrowed from this story, but all Titian's other mythological paintings for Philip show scenes from Ovid, where Antiope's story features (Metamorphoses, VI, 110-111). Scenes of satyr voyeurism or sexual assault, given titles such as Nymph Surprised by a Satyr, are found in art, mostly later than this, but only a very rash satyr would treat the goddess Venus in this way. The painting can be compared to his The Bacchanal of the Andrians of 1523-24 (Prado), where an apparently unconscious nude in a version of the Dresden Venus pose shares the picture space with a group of revellers in a mixture of nudity, contemporary and classical dress.

Venus or Antiope sleeps as yet undisturbed, not only by the voyeur, but a hunting scene above her, where hounds have brought down a stag, and immediately left of her, a satyr or faun with the legs of a goat seated on the ground, in conversation with a lady in contemporary dress. Immediately beside them stands a hunter, with large dogs, and at far left another huntsman blows a horn.

Over Venus' head, Cupid perches in a tree, with an arrow in his bow, apparently pointed at Jupiter. In the middle distance a naked couple, apparently both women, talk or kiss on the banks of a river. The river has a wide waterfall above the stag, and presumably then flows above the conversing couple before perhaps circling round behind the viewer to create the water behind the Jupiter/satyr, but this is not shown clearly, which is rather typical of Titian. To the right, the landscape includes a contemporary farmhouse at the top of the rise, and a distant settlement dominated by a church tower and steeple. Distant mountains complete the view, which like many Titian landscapes reflects the country between Venice and his hometown of Pieve di Cadore in the mountains, though he does not seem to have closely depicted specific locations.

== Meaning ==
Art historians have struggled somewhat in trying to find a coherent meaning for these disparate elements. Their incongruous combination makes it something of a test case for a long-running dispute over the extent to which Titian's mythological paintings (and to some extent those of Venetian painters in general) carry "great complexity of allegorical meanings", in the way that some works of other Renaissance artists are generally accepted to do.

Harold Wethey was not impressed by the idea that the different elements represented different modes of life: "active" in the hunters, "voluptuous" in Venus/Antiope and Jupiter, and "contemplative" in the couple sitting on the grass. Another line of thinking is to compare Venus to the stag brought down by the hounds, the stag then becoming a cerf fragile, in an old Gothic visual metaphor with the hunted stag representing the life and trials of Christ or man. This draws on a wealth of imagery in religious writings, ultimately going back to Psalm 41/42: "As a deer pants for flowing streams, so pants my soul for you, O God..".

Alternatively it can be seen as an essentially decorative piling-up of different groups of subject matter with no overall complex meaning intended, but an impressive effect.

== Titian's reclining nudes ==
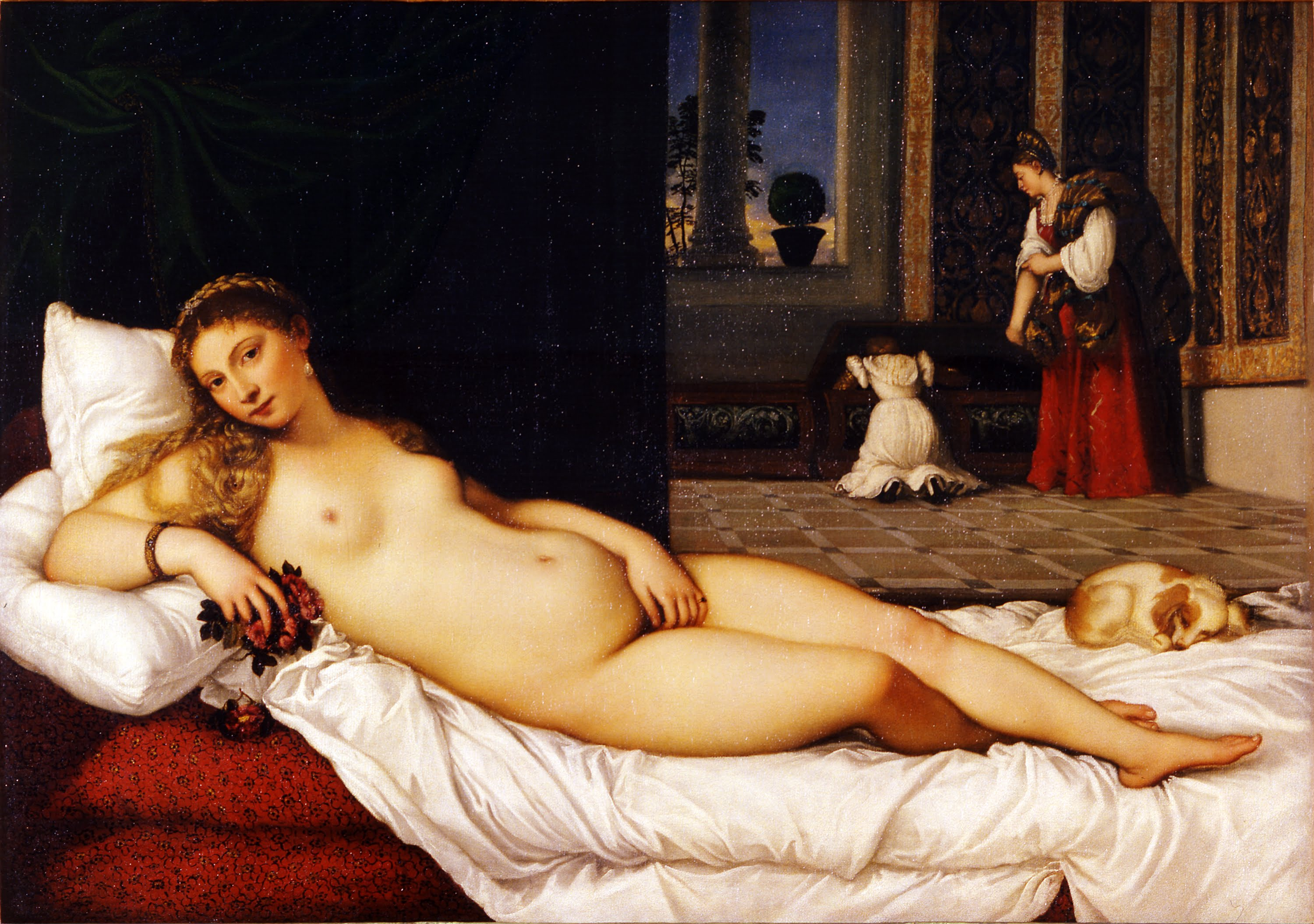
Titian's Venus of Urbino, c. 1534, Uffizi

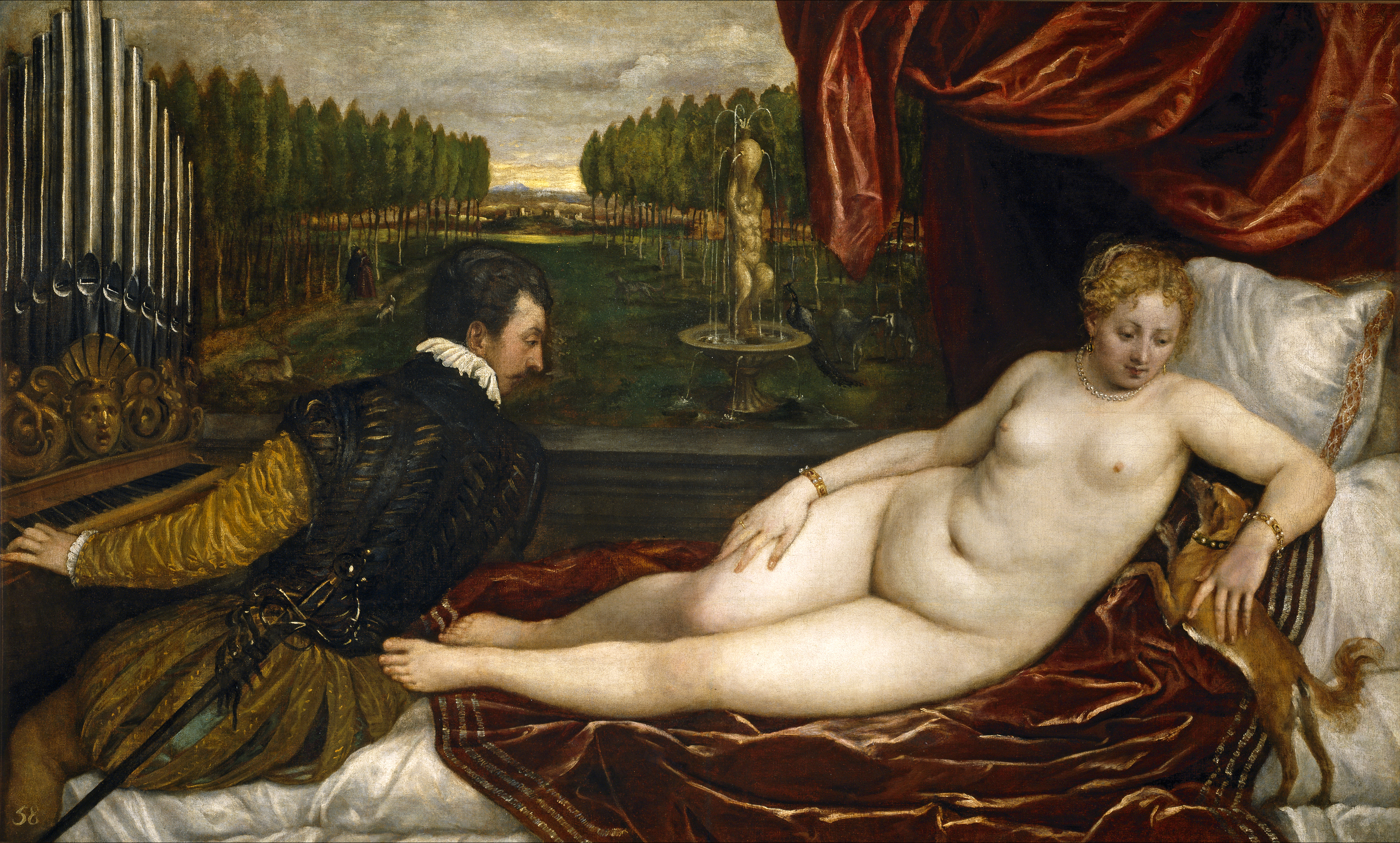
Venus and Musician or Venus with an Organist and a Dog, Prado, c. 1550, which hung in the same room in Whitehall Palace.

The painting is a development of Titian's compositions with a reclining female nude in the Venetian style. The pose of the Pardo Venus, recalling a Venus pudica pose with one arm covering the genitals, is similar to that in Giorgione's Dresden Venus, which was completed by Titian after Giorgione's death in 1510. Around 1534 Titian had painted the Venus of Urbino, and a similar scene from 1545, perhaps a lost recorded Venus sent to Charles V, "was the basis" for the Venus and Musician series, which exists in several versions. Unlike the others, the Cupid in most versions of Venus and Musician, and probably in the Pardo Venus, does allow a clear identification of the female as Venus. However, allusions to the goddess elevate such images from the profane category of courtesans.

Kenneth Clark described the Pardo Venus as a "laboured attempt to recapture his early style", and the Dresden/Urbino pose here "much coarsened". A more original composition and physique, also begun in the mid-1540s, but with versions painted in the 1550s and perhaps 1560s, is used in the series of Danaë paintings, which Clark sees as Titian adopting the conventions for the nude prevailing outside Venice; "in the rest of Italy bodies of an entirely different shape had long been fashionable".

For Clark, the Venus of the Venus and Musician versions, where the head changes direction but the body remains exactly the same, is "entirely Venetian, younger sister of all those expensive ladies whom Palma Vecchio, Paris Bordone, and Bonifazio painted for local consumption."

== History ==
In 1574, Titian had still not been paid for the painting, according to a list he sent Philip's secretary and favourite Antonio Pérez. The painting was still in El Pardo when most of the palace burnt down in 1603, with the loss of several Titians and other important art. Vicente Carducho (1576/78–1638), an Italian-born court painter in Spain, records that when he heard the news, the first question of King Philip III of Spain was to ask if the Venus had been lost. Told that it survived, he is said to have commented "I am satisfied, for the rest will be redone".

Despite this prestige, the painting was given to Charles I of England in 1623 when, as Prince of Wales, he made a quixotic, unauthorized and unplanned visit to Madrid to try to acquire a Spanish bride. A copy made in London for Charles' favourite William Murray, 1st Earl of Dysart still hangs in Ham House. After Charles' execution, the valuers assessing his collection in Whitehall Palace found the "great Lardge and famous peece" in the "Second and Middle Privie Lodging Roome", along with the Venus and Musician now in the Prado, and valued them at £500 and £150 respectively. They were both bought on the same day in 1649 at one of the sales of Charles' art collection by Colonel John Hutchinson, who paid £600 and £165. Hutchinson was buying as an investment, and as the major continental collectors realized the situation and organized agents, he sold all his major purchases within a few years.

Alonso de Cárdenas the Spanish ambassador, managing purchases in England a year or two later, declined to buy the Pardo Venus, preferring Correggio's Venus with Mercury and Cupid ('The School of Love') (now National Gallery, London), as "no es tan profano como la otra, Venus dormido y el Satyro" ("it is not as profane as the other, Venus sleeping and the satyr"). In 1653, Hutchinson skillfully negotiated Bordeaux-Neufville, who combined the roles of French ambassador and Cardinal Mazarin's art agent, into paying £1,200 for it. It was acquired from Mazarin's heirs in 1661 by Louis XIV, and remained in the French royal collection until this passed to the Louvre Museum.

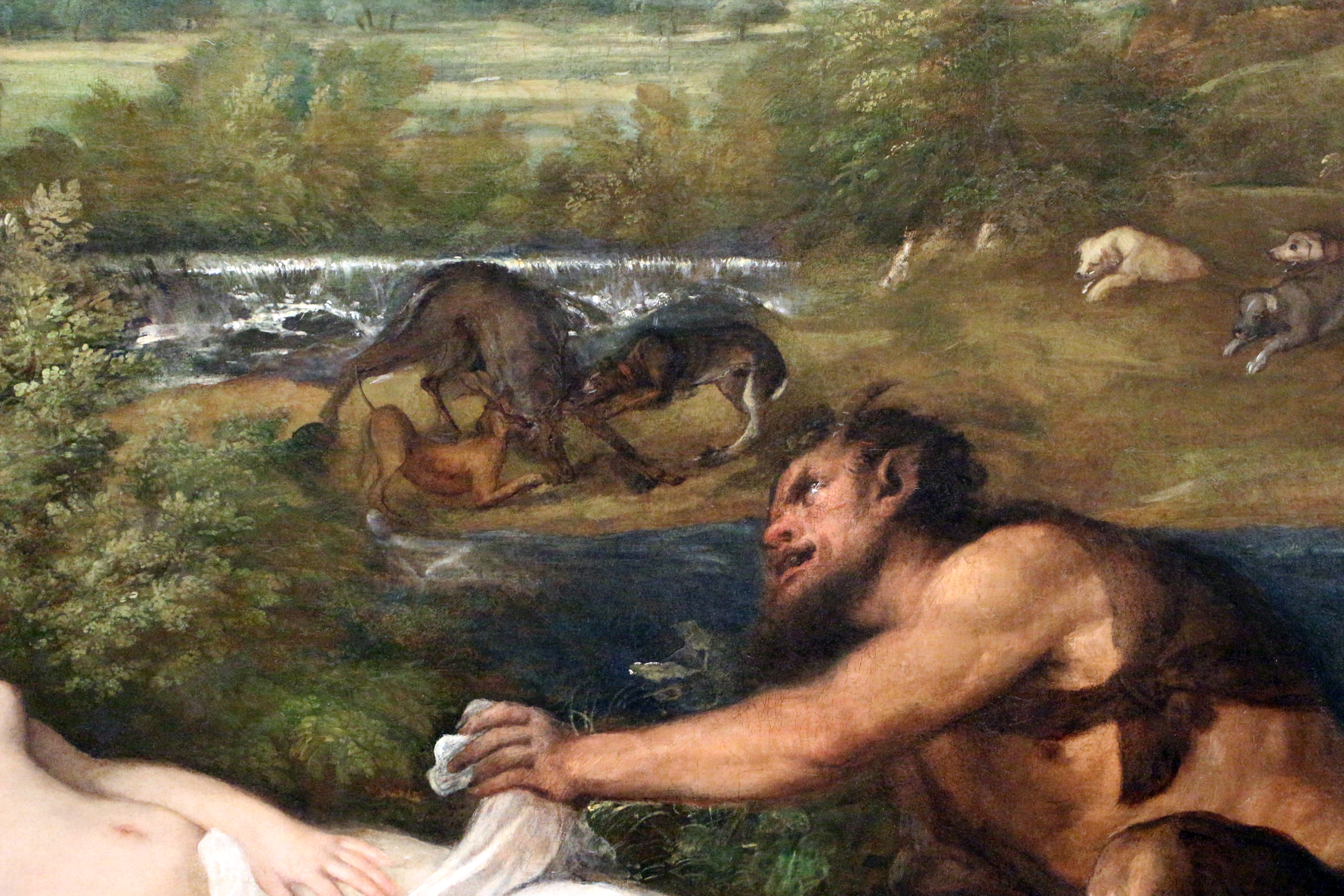
The stag brought down

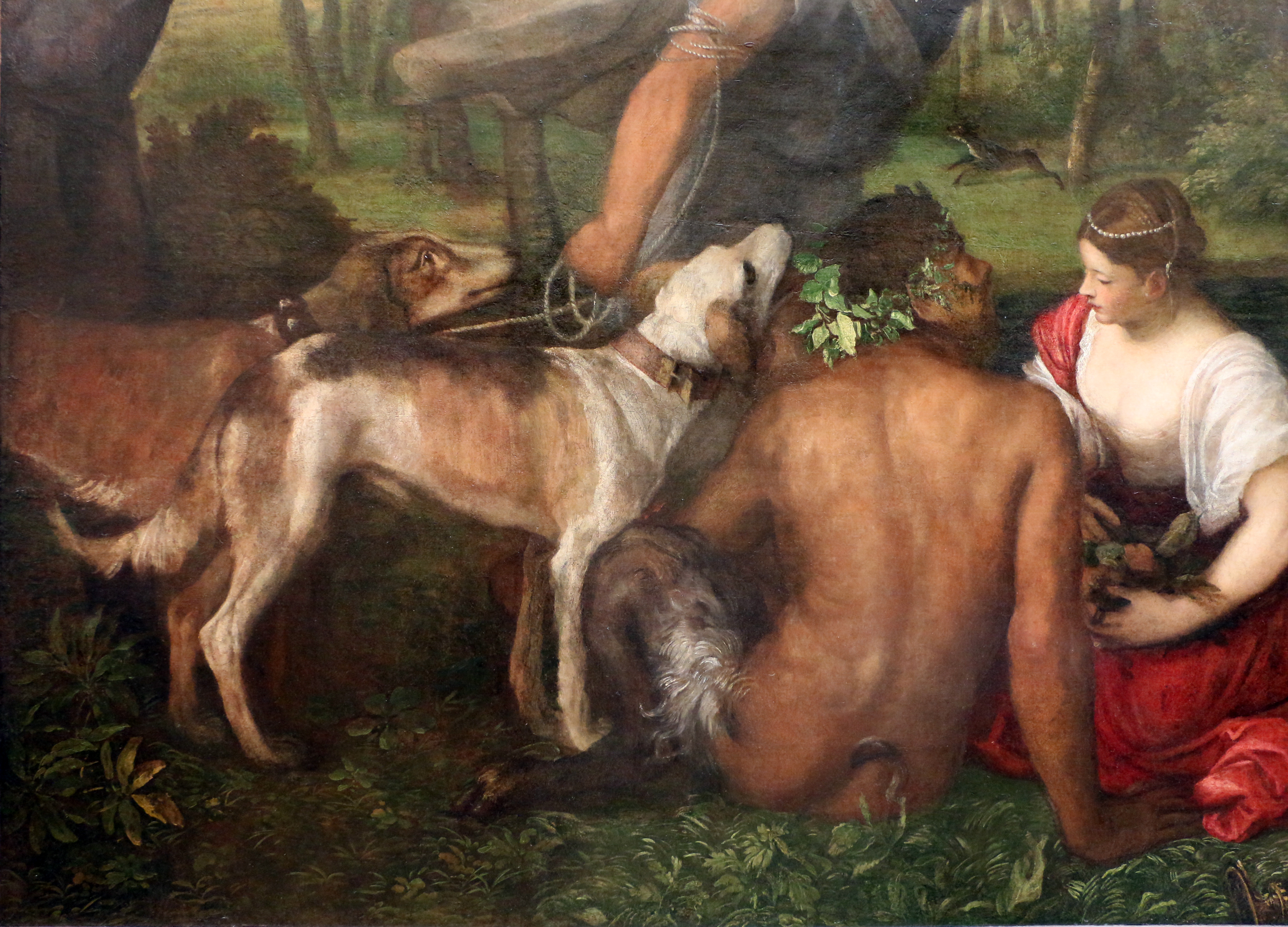
The figures at left

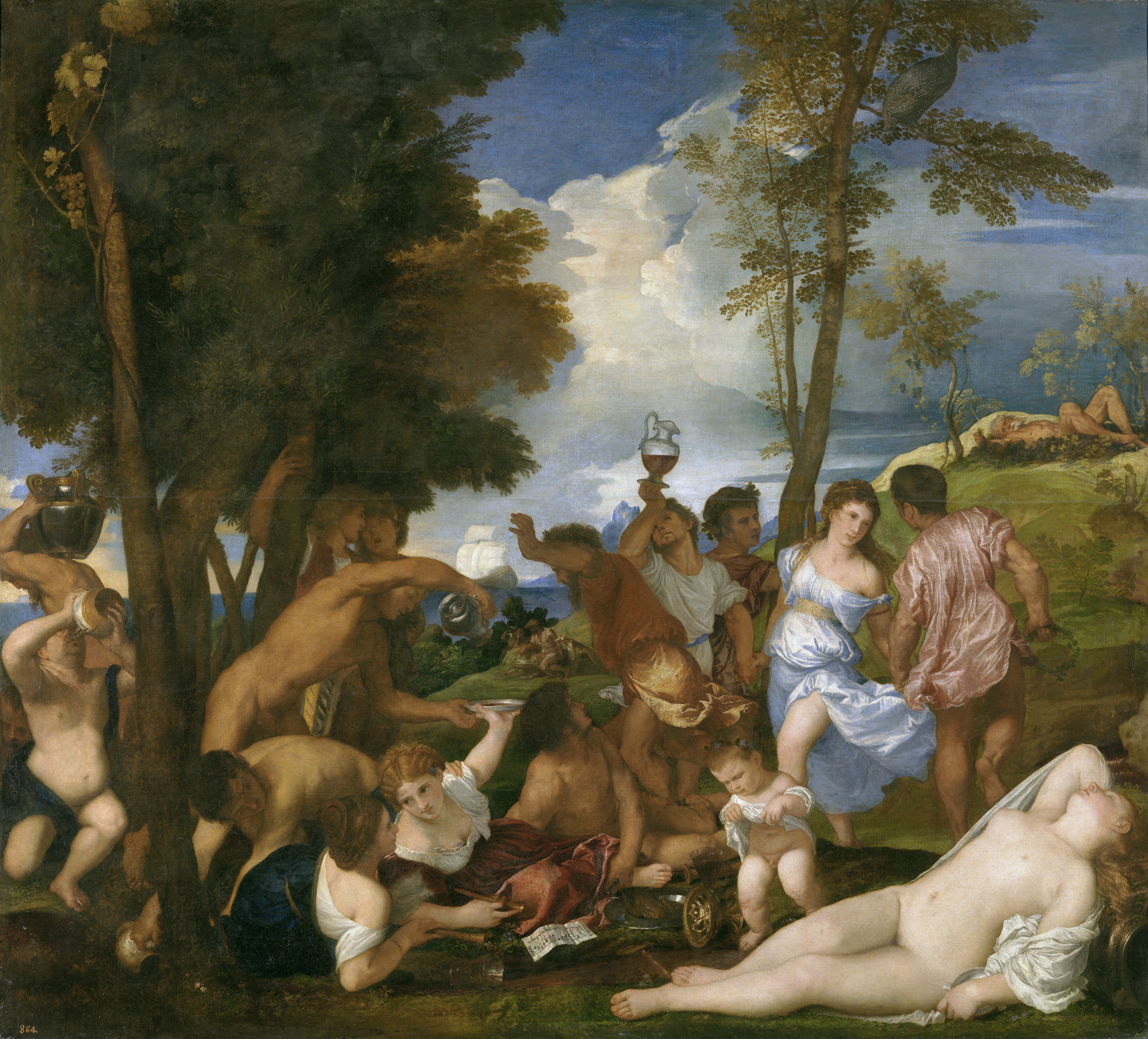
Titian's The Bacchanal of the Andrians, 1523–24, Prado

== See also ==
- List of works by Titian
