= Eduardo Elsztain =

Argentine businessman (born 1960)

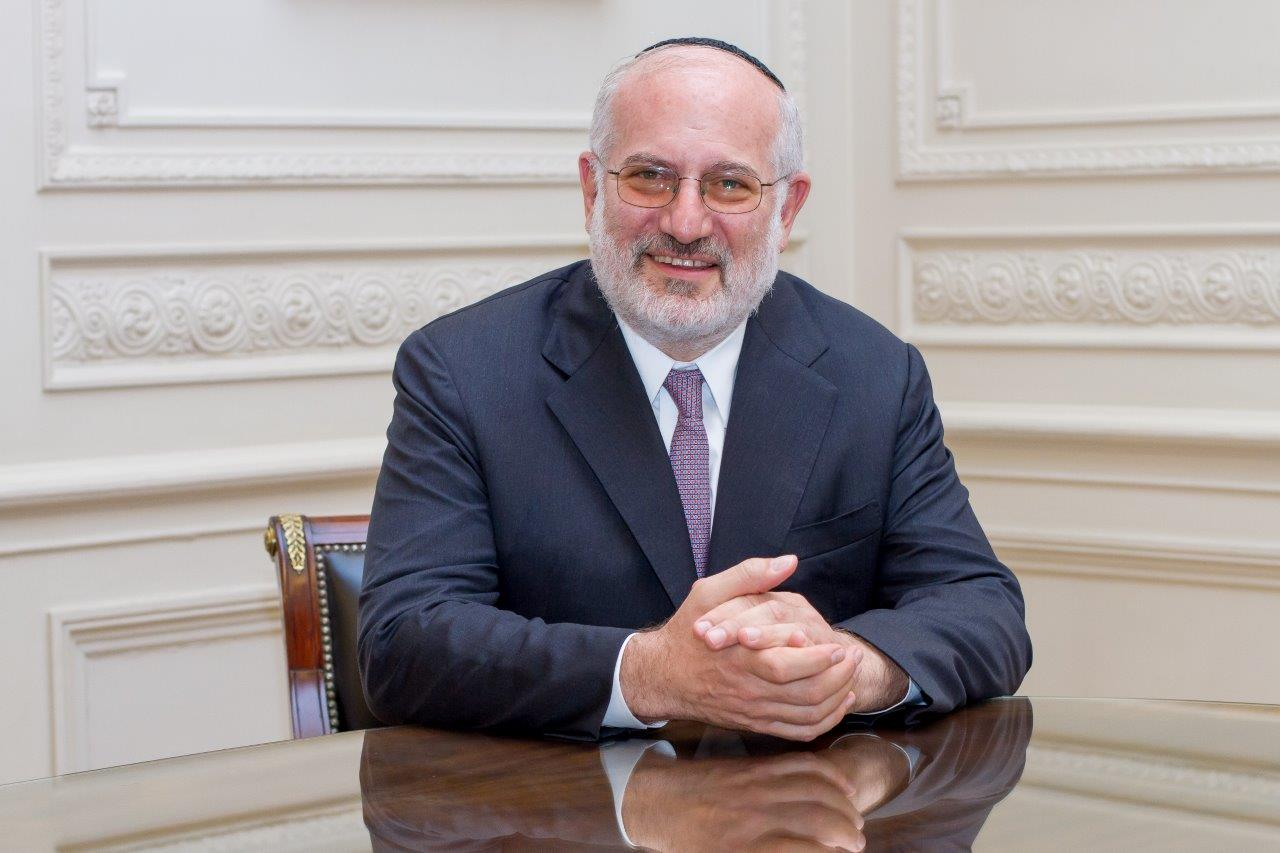
- Born: January 26, 1960 (age 66); Buenos Aires, Argentina
- Education: Colegio Nacional de Buenos Aires
- Occupations: Chairman and CEO of IRSA and Banco Hipotecario
- Spouse: Mariana Carmona

Eduardo Sergio Elsztain (born January 26, 1960) is an Argentine businessman involved in the real estate, financial, technology, and agribusiness sectors.

He is the chairman of Inversiones y Representaciones S.A. (IRSA), Argentina's largest real estate company, which is listed on the New York Stock Exchange; of Cresud, a leading agri-business company that operates in Argentina, Bolivia, Paraguay, and Uruguay and is listed on the NASDAQ; of BrasilAgro (Companhia Brasileira de Propriedades Agrícolas), which is also on the NYSE; and of the public–private partnership Banco Hipotecario, Argentina's leading mortgage bank in which Elsztain is the largest private shareholder.

== Early life and education ==
His father was a physician and his mother a schoolteacher.

His paternal grandfather, Isaac Elsztain, was born in the Świętokrzyskie Voivodeship, in the historic region known as Lesser Poland. Isaac emigrated to Argentina in 1917 and owned a general store in Las Lomitas, Formosa Province, where he had three children. The sons moved to Buenos Aires to attend secondary school at a boarding institution. The family settled permanently in Buenos Aires in 1950, where Isaac Elsztain turned to real estate development. In 1973, Isaac Elsztain purchased a property in the department of Rivadavia, Salta Province, where he developed the Los Pozos ranch, which has belonged to Cresud since 1995.

He completed his primary education at the Instituto Renard in Buenos Aires. He attended secondary school at the Colegio Nacional de Buenos Aires, graduating in 1978. In 1980, he undertook volunteer work and leadership courses in Jerusalem. He studied medicine and economics at the University of Buenos Aires, but did not complete his degrees, choosing instead to focus on his business career.

Elsztain has been married since 1991 to Mariana Carmona, with whom he has four children. His brother, Alejandro G. Elsztain, has served as CEO of Cresud since 1994.

His maternal grandfather, León, instilled in him Jewish traditions. A devout Jew, Elsztain built a synagogue next door to his home. His sister lives in Israel. Elsztain is a follower of the Lubavitcher Rebbe.

== Career ==
=== IRSA ===
His business mentor was Peter Gruber, a former shareholder of IRSA and manager of the Templeton fund, whom he met in 1984. Menachem Mendel Schneerson, the Rebbe of Chabad Lubavitch, advised him to direct his investments toward real estate development.

Elsztain lived in New York in 1989–1990. During that period, in 1990, he "talked his way into a meeting with the legendary investor George Soros," according to Haaretz. Another source states that Elsztain met Soros "through contacts...in the Jewish community in Buenos Aires." In any event, Soros "was persuaded to let the ambitious young man manage $10 million for him," which Elsztain did "with great success." Speaking to The Jerusalem Post in 2013, Elsztain himself described "the moment...that changed his career" as follows: "I somehow managed to land a meeting with George Soros, a very rich man. We talked for an hour or so, and then he asked me how much money I thought I could handle. I told him I could manage $10 million, and he said 'Okay, no problem!'" Soros told the Post that Elsztain, despite his youth and inexperience, "knew when to sell and when to buy." This encounter precipitated Elsztain's quick "leap from utter anonymity to Argentina's business elite." Soros became a leading investor in IRSA. The partnership with Soros became profitable for both parties, as the Argentine economy recovered during the 1990s from the severe stagflation of the previous decade. Within four years Elsztain had raised $110 million and acquired "office buildings and shopping centers in Argentina, including the Alto Palermo Shopping Mall." Elsztain's meeting with Soros has been described as the turning point in his career. He has been called "Soros' golden boy." In 1992-94, Soros helped Elsztain gain control of Cresud, a leading landowner of prime pampas agricultural land, and served as his partner in the firm for many years. IRSA entered the international equity markets with Soros's backing in 1994. Losses stemming from the economic crisis that began in 1998 led the Soros Fund Management to divest most of its IRSA interests by late 1999. In total, Elsztain worked for over a decade with Soros. In addition to Soros, Elsztain has also worked closely with U.S. real estate magnate Sam Zell, U.S. investment fund honcho Michael Steinhardt, and Hollywood mogul Edgar Bronfman. His close friends and business partners have included Clarisa Lifsic, who chairs Banco Hipotecario, and Saúl Zang, the lawyer for his companies.

Elsztain acquired IRSA in June 1991.

IRSA shares are listed on Bolsas y Mercados Argentinos and, since 1994, on the New York Stock Exchange (NYSE). The company is engaged in the ownership, development, and management of shopping centers, office buildings, hotels, convention centers, and other commercial properties in Argentina.

IRSA became a leading local real-estate development firm during the 1990s, purchasing 13 up-market Buenos Aires office buildings and a leading local shopping-mall developer, Alto Palermo S.A. (APSA). Through APSA, the group purchased important tourist assets such as the Llao Llao Hotel, a Bariloche mountain resort, and a number of shopping malls, including Abasto Shopping (Buenos Aires), Alto Avellaneda (Avellaneda), Alto NOA (Salta), Alto Rosario (Rosario), Buenos Aires Design (Buenos Aires), Shopping Córdoba (Córdoba), Dot Baires Shopping (Buenos Aires), Mendoza Shopping (Mendoza), Alcorta Shopping (Buenos Aires), Patio Bullrich (Buenos Aires), Patio Olmos (Córdoba), Soleil Premium Outlet (Boulogne).

The strong recovery in the Argentine economy after 2002 then fostered growth into the mortgage-lending sector, with the purchase of 28% of the formerly state owned Banco Hipotecario, and among its shopping centers, which, as the source of half of IRSA's revenues, boosted the firm's income; in 2008, it developed Dot Baires, a 190,000m² (2 million ft²) shopping center and the largest building of its kind in Argentina. Elsztain reportedly "did a good job of exploiting the real estate boom in Argentina" from 2006–2010. During this period IRSA's share price rose 155 percent and the firm came to be worth more than half a billion dollars. Between July 2011 and July 2012, IRSA netted $61 million.

IRSA bought 30% of New York's Lipstick Building (885 Third Avenue) in 2007, and in November 2010 increased his stake to 49%. His close friend Rabbi Yoshiyahu Pinto "reportedly brokered the deal in which Elsztain bought the Lipstick Building in Manhattan from Ilan Ben Dov, as a result of which Elsztain became the partner of another businessman close to Pinto − Jacky Ben Zaken." It was also Pinto who arranged for him to meet Nochi Dankner and who mediated discussions of the Ganden acquisition of Israel's IDB Group.

Among the real estate projects developed by Elsztain is the redevelopment of the former Boca Juniors training facility in the Nueva Pompeya neighborhood. In 1997, through IRSA, he acquired the 22-hectare (54-acre) site and after 28 years of development, in 2024 obtained the necessary approvals to develop Ramblas del Plata, an urban development project featuring a waterfront promenade with direct access to the Río de la Plata, a large park, and proximity to Ministro Pistarini International Airport. By 2025, the project had sold fifteen buildings and committed 17 of the 20 lots corresponding to its first development phase to various local developers.

According to Haaretz, "IRSA's major enterprises have relied on Elsztain's ability to spot the potential in dilapidated properties and renovate them. In the Puerto Madero district of Buenos Aires − an entire neighborhood that was built on the ruins of the city's old docks − IRSA built commercial and office space. In the center of the city, Elsztain saw the potential in the ravaged Abasto de Buenos Aires building, a wholesale market that stood empty and mice-infested. Retaining its historic facade, he built the Abasto Shopping Center over the foundations. Another example is Isla Demarchi, where Elsztain was one of the parties behind the construction of a commercial and office complex on an artificial island that extended the area of Buenos Aires into the Río de la Plata."

=== Cresud ===
He is Chairman and a Member of the Executive Committee of Cresud, titles he has held since 1994. He is Chairman and President of the Executive Committee of Alto Palermo S.A., titles he has held since 1994. He is Chairman and Director of Banco Hipotecario SA (of which he has also served as Vice Chairman), titles he has held since 1999. He is also the Chairman of the Board and a Director of Brasilagro Companhia Brasileira de Propriedades Agrícolas. He owns IRSA, Cresud, and Hipotecario through his holding company IFISA. Today Elsztain controls Cresud, of which he owns 38 percent, and owns 65 percent of IRSA through Cresud. As of 2013, Cresud was trading on NASDAQ at a value of $370 million. "Except for its holdings in IRSA," according to Haaretz, Cresud "is an agriculture business of only moderate profitability." Today Cresud owns 23 million square meters of land and "focuses on acquiring grain and cattle farms, and on milk production." During the first decade of the 21st century it was named Argentina's largest meat and grain manufacturer, but it has since sold off some of its farms.

Through Cresud, Elsztain has been involved in agricultural investments in Argentina, including farmland used for grain production and cattle ranching. As of June 2025, Cresud held a 35.22% stake in BrasilAgro, an agricultural company operating in Brazil, Bolivia and Paraguay, and a 54.06% stake in IRSA, a real estate company. Through IRSA, the group also held an indirect interest in Banco Hipotecario, in which IRSA owned 29.12% of the outstanding shares.

=== Other investments ===
Elsztain was involved in investments in the United States, while his business activities also extended to Australia, Brazil and Israel.

Elsztain has served on the board of the Australian mining company Austral Gold since 2007 and became its Non-Executive Chairman in May 2023.

In 2010, IRSA acquired an approximately 11% stake in Hersha Hospitality Trust, which at the time held a portfolio of 77 hotels in the United States. By 2012, IRSA was reported to have interests in approximately 2,000 hotel rooms in New York City.

Elsztain owns the Llao Llao Hotel in the tourist resort of San Carlos de Bariloche in Río Negro Province, Argentina. He also owns property on the resort island of Isla Victoria in Lake Nahuel Huapi. In addition, he owns the Iaacob House Hostel in Buenos Aires, which "offers Israeli travelers lodgings in the capital at a fair price − as long as they comply with the policy of segregated rooms for men and women." In May 2010, IRSA made an offer to buy Telecom Italia's share of Telecom Argentina. According to one source, "IRSA is recognized worldwide as the Argentina company that ensures the best business in real estate."

In September 2012, Elsztain entered into an agreement to invest $25 million in Ganden Holdings, acquiring a 10% stake. The agreement included an option to invest an additional $75 million, potentially increasing his ownership to approximately 30%.

== Endeavor ==
Elsztain took part in the early development of Endeavor, a nonprofit founded in 1997 to support entrepreneurs in emerging markets. The organization grew out of conversations between co-founder Linda Rottenberg and a group of Argentine businesspeople, Elsztain among them. In a 2019 interview with BBC News Mundo, Rottenberg recalled approaching Elsztain for support and asking him for US$200,000, which he agreed to give.

Elsztain then helped set up Endeavor Argentina, which began operating in 1998. A 2020 report in Clarín named him among the businesspeople involved in the organization's early years in Argentina. He later chaired the board of Endeavor Argentina and became a member of Endeavor's Global Advisory Board.

In September 2026, Elsztain spoke at Experiencia Endeavor Rosario, an entrepreneurship event in Rosario, Santa Fe Province, where he discussed IRSA's real estate projects in the city, including plans to expand the Alto Rosario shopping center.

== Other activities ==
Elsztain is an annual conferee at the World Economic Forum in Davos, and is active in Jewish philanthropic causes as the prime Argentine supporter of and fundraiser for the World Jewish Congress (WJC) and for Taglit-Birthright Israel, and as the President of Chabad Argentina. He is also President of Hillel Argentina and Taglit Birthright Argentina. Close to leading American Jewish executive Edgar Bronfman, he was named Treasurer of the WJC in 2005, and then served as chairman of its Governing Board (the group's second-highest post) from 2009 to 2013. In May 2013, he was elected a vice-president of the World Jewish Congress and became chairman of the new WJC Business Advisory Council.

He is a member of Argentine Enterprise Association (AEA), of the Board of Directors of the Buenos Aires Stock Exchange, and of the Group of 50, and he has attended the G20 Business Summits. He is also the President of Fundación IRSA and Museo de los Niños del Abasto.

== Political connections ==
Elsztain is a member of the World Jewish Congress (WJC) and an institutional figure within the Argentine Jewish community. In August 2008, he attended a meeting in Caracas, in his capacity as WJC treasurer, at the first encounter between Venezuelan President Hugo Chávez and a representative of the organization. According to Elsztain, Chávez had expressed his disagreement with Holocaust denial and with positions advocating for the elimination of the State of Israel. The meeting was controversial, as former parliamentarian and former Minister of Culture Paulina Gamus stated that it constituted an ill-timed show of support for the Venezuelan leader.

Following the death of Néstor Kirchner in October 2010, the WJC and the Latin American Jewish Congress (LAJC) issued a joint statement highlighting the former Argentine president's willingness to address the concerns of Jewish communities in the region, as well as his role as a mediator with other governments on their behalf, particularly in the aftermath of the AMIA bombing. As chairman of IRSA, Elsztain was received at the Casa Rosada by President Cristina Fernández de Kirchner in May 2008. In April 2013, Cristina Fernández de Kirchner visited flood victims in the Mitre neighborhood and announced she would call on Elsztain to address the situation at the Dot Baires Shopping center, an IRSA property whose facilities were being pointed to by local residents as a possible aggravating factor in the flooding. In February 2014, the DOT shopping center opened a reservoir to prevent future flooding.

During his visit to Argentina in March 2016, then-President of the United States Barack Obama stayed at one of the hotels belonging to the IRSA holding company. Elsztain stated that this was a sign of Argentina's return to the international stage after years of financial isolation. Elsztain organizes the annual Llao Llao Forum, a gathering of business and political leaders held at the hotel of the same name in Bariloche. Former President of Chile Sebastián Piñera attended the Forum in 2015. Former Argentine President Mauricio Macri participated in the 2022 edition. In 2024, speakers included President of Paraguay Santiago Peña and President of Uruguay Luis Lacalle Pou. In April 2023, Elsztain met Javier Milei at the Llao Llao Forum. Following Milei's inauguration as president in December 2023, Elsztain co-signed, along with other business leaders affiliated with the Argentine Business Association, a statement of support for the incoming administration.

== Controversy ==
In 1997, during the presidency of Carlos Menem, Argentina enacted Law No. 24,855, which authorized the privatization of Banco Hipotecario. The process subsequently became the subject of legal challenges and criminal complaints concerning alleged irregularities. In 2001, complaints were filed against former government officials, including former Economy Minister Roque Fernández and former bank chairman Pablo Rojo.In March 2009, following the resignation of Clarisa Lifsic de Estol, Elsztain, then the bank's largest private shareholder, became chairman of Banco Hipotecario.

In November 2017, Elsztain was named among the Argentine businesspeople linked to offshore companies in reporting on the Paradise Papers.
