= Patio Olmos =

Shopping gallery in Córdoba, Argentina

Coordinates: 31°25′12″S 64°11′16″W

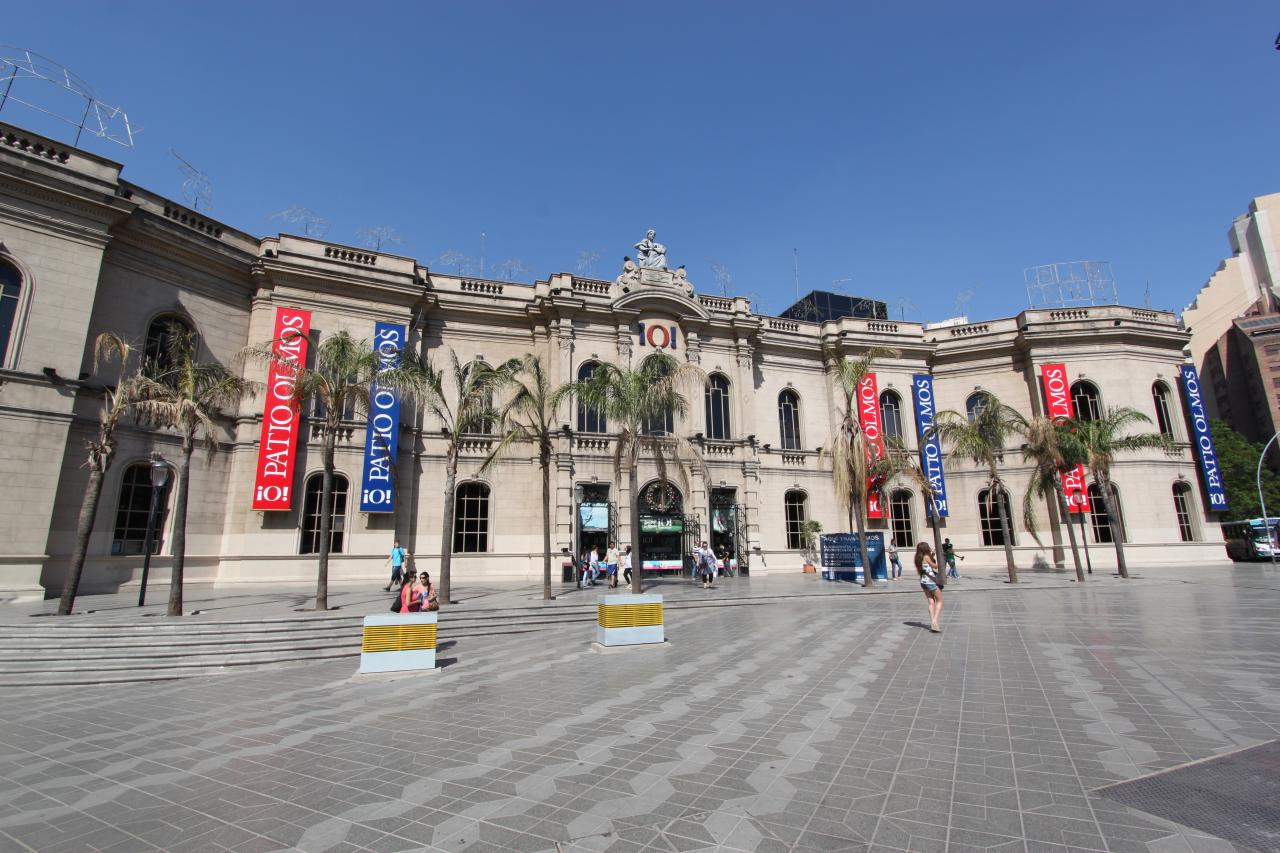
- View of the main entrance
- Location: City of Córdoba, Córdoba Province, Argentina
- Address: Avenida Vélez Sarsfield, corner of Bv. San Juan
- Opened: 5 May 1995
- Owner: IRSA
- Architect: Elías Senestrari
- Num. of stores: 181
- Num. of anchor tenants: 2
- Floor area: 45,000 m²
- Floors: 4
- Parking: 700 spaces (3 levels)
- Website: www.patioolmos.com

Patio Olmos is a shopping mall in the city of Córdoba, Argentina. The building is owned by IRSA, while operation of the shopping center is carried out under concession.

== History and overview ==
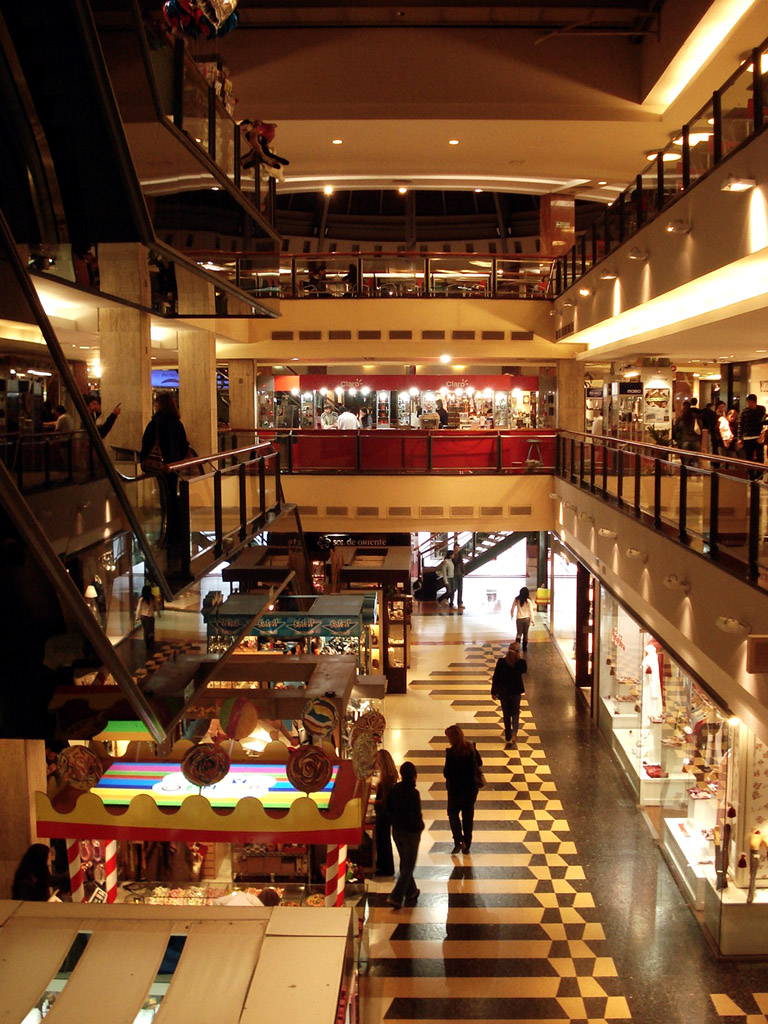
The promenade

The development of the southeast suburb in Córdoba led by the businessman Miguel Crisol was accompanied by a surge of public investments. Among the first of such works was the Boys' Middle School, commissioned by Governor José Vicente de Olmos in 1906 and built by the Ministry of Public Works of the Province of Córdoba. Designed by Elías Senestrari, the renaissance revivalist building was inaugurated on November 4, 1909. Governor Olmos, who had recently died, was honored by having the school named after him. The school was built with a semicircular floor plan.

The building's condition declined over the decades, however, and a 1977 earthquake in San Juan, Argentina, though over 300 mi (480 km) to the west, caused it serious structural damage and led to its closure.

It remained abandoned until a 1991 initiative by Governor Eduardo Angeloz resulted in the building's restoration. The agreement signed in 1992 between the province of Córdoba, the building's proprietors and a consortium of two local developers allowed the firms a 35-year lease at a token monthly rent in exchange for their development of the former school into an upscale shopping gallery and other investments. The resulting Patio Olmos Shopping Center was inaugurated in May 1995.

In November 2006, the Corporación Inmobiliaria Córdoba (Corincor) awarded the tender for the sale of the building to the IRSA Group, chaired by Eduardo Elsztain. In October 2007, IRSA acquired the building from the Province of Córdoba for 32.5 million Argentine pesos (equivalent to approximately US$10 million at the time).

Patio Olmos remains Córdoba's most important shopping mall, with brands like Lacoste, Puma, La Martina, Carmen Steffens, Levi's, 47 Street, Adidas, Swarovski, among others. Its 25,000 m^{2} (265,000 ft^{2}) indoor area houses over 150 retail outlets and a multiplex cinema operated by the Sydney-based Hoyts Group. It has more than 180 stores spread across 45,000 m², a multiplex cinema complex operated by Grupo Hoyts, and a multipurpose hall.
