= Padova =

Padova is the Italian name for the city of Padua and the province of Padua.

Padova may also refer to:

- Padova railway station

== Sports ==
- Calcio Padova, a football club
- UCF Padova, a former women's football club
- CS Plebiscito Padova, a water polo club
- Pallavolo Padova, a volleyball club

== People ==
- Bartolino da Padova, a 14th-century composer
- Bartolomeo Bellano, also known as Vellano da Padova, a Renaissance sculptor and architect
- Ernesto Padova (1845–1896), a mathematician

== See also ==
- Padua (disambiguation)
- Padovana, a Renaissance dance
- Padovani
- Padovano
