= Venus of Urbino =

Painting by Titian

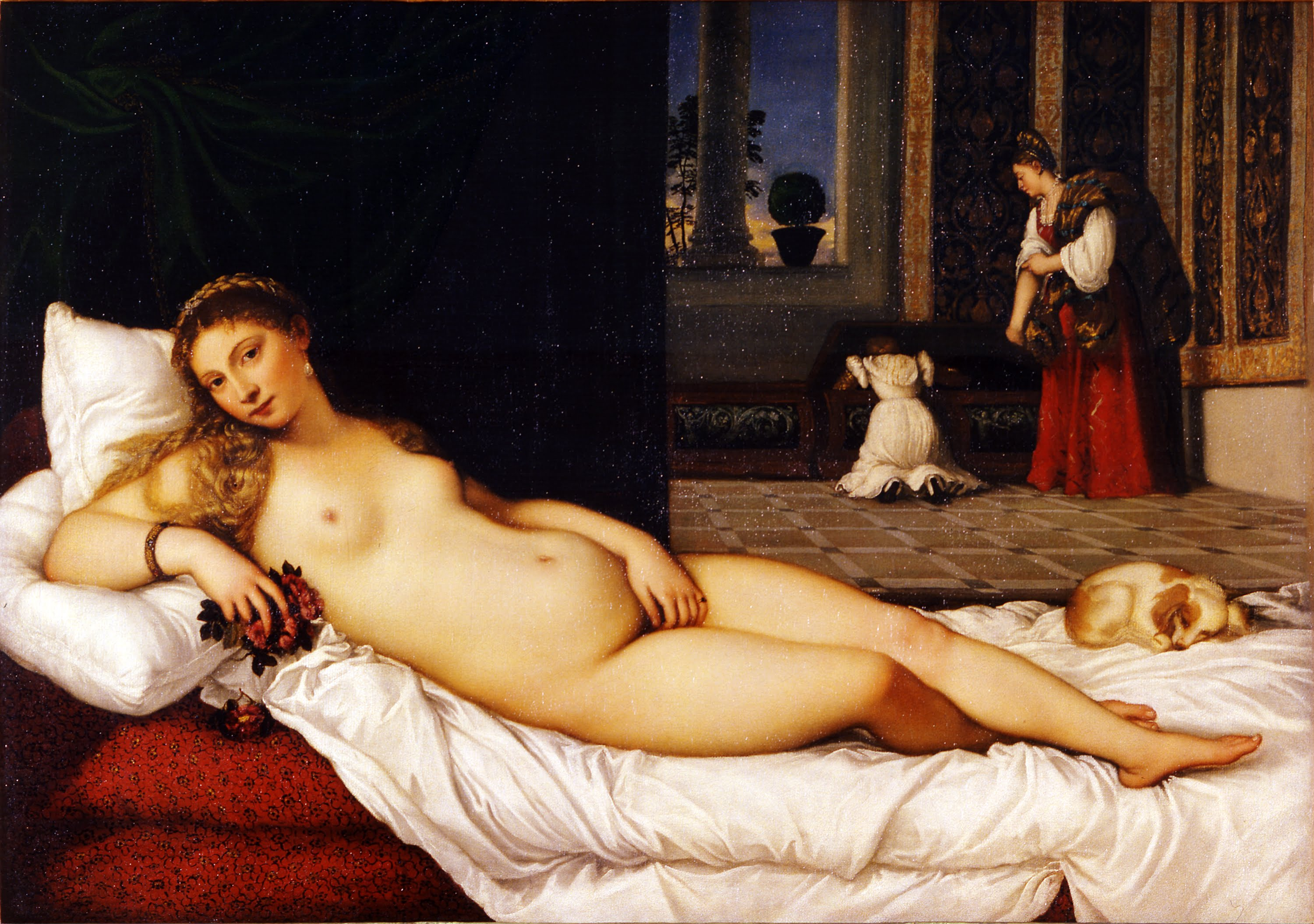
- Artist: Titian
- Year: 1534
- Medium: Oil on canvas
- Dimensions: 119 cm × 165 cm (47 in × 65 in)
- Location: Uffizi, Florence

The Venus of Urbino (also known as Reclining Venus) is an oil painting by Italian painter Titian, depicting a nude young woman, traditionally identified with the goddess Venus, reclining on a couch or bed in the sumptuous surroundings of a Renaissance palace. Work on the painting seems to have begun anywhere from 1532 or 1534, and was perhaps completed in 1534, but not sold until 1538. It is currently held in the Galleria degli Uffizi in Florence.

The figure’s pose derives from the Dresden Venus made around 1510–11, traditionally attributed to Giorgione but with the landscape completed by Titian. In this painting, Titian places Venus indoors, meets the viewer’s gaze, and makes her sensuality explicit. Iconographic interpretations of the painting among art historians fall into two groups; both agree that the painting has a powerful erotic charge, but beyond that, it is seen either as a portrait of a courtesan, perhaps Zaffetta, or as a painting celebrating the marriage of its first owner (who according to some may not have commissioned it).

This disagreement forms part of a wider debate on the meaning of the mainly Venetian tradition of the reclining female nude, which Titian had created, or helped to create. The woman's intimate gesture has been interpreted by some scholars to represent masturbation, an act linked to Renaissance marriage customs, where female arousal—including self-stimulation—was believed to aid conception and ensure successful consummation.

For Charles Hope, "It has yet to be shown that the most famous example of this genre, Titian's Venus of Urbino, is anything other than a representation of a beautiful nude woman on a bed, devoid of classical or even allegorical content". Even the indefatigable finder of allegories drawing on Renaissance Neoplatonism, Edgar Wind, had to admit that in this case "an undisguised hedonism had at last dispelled the Platonic metaphors".

== History ==
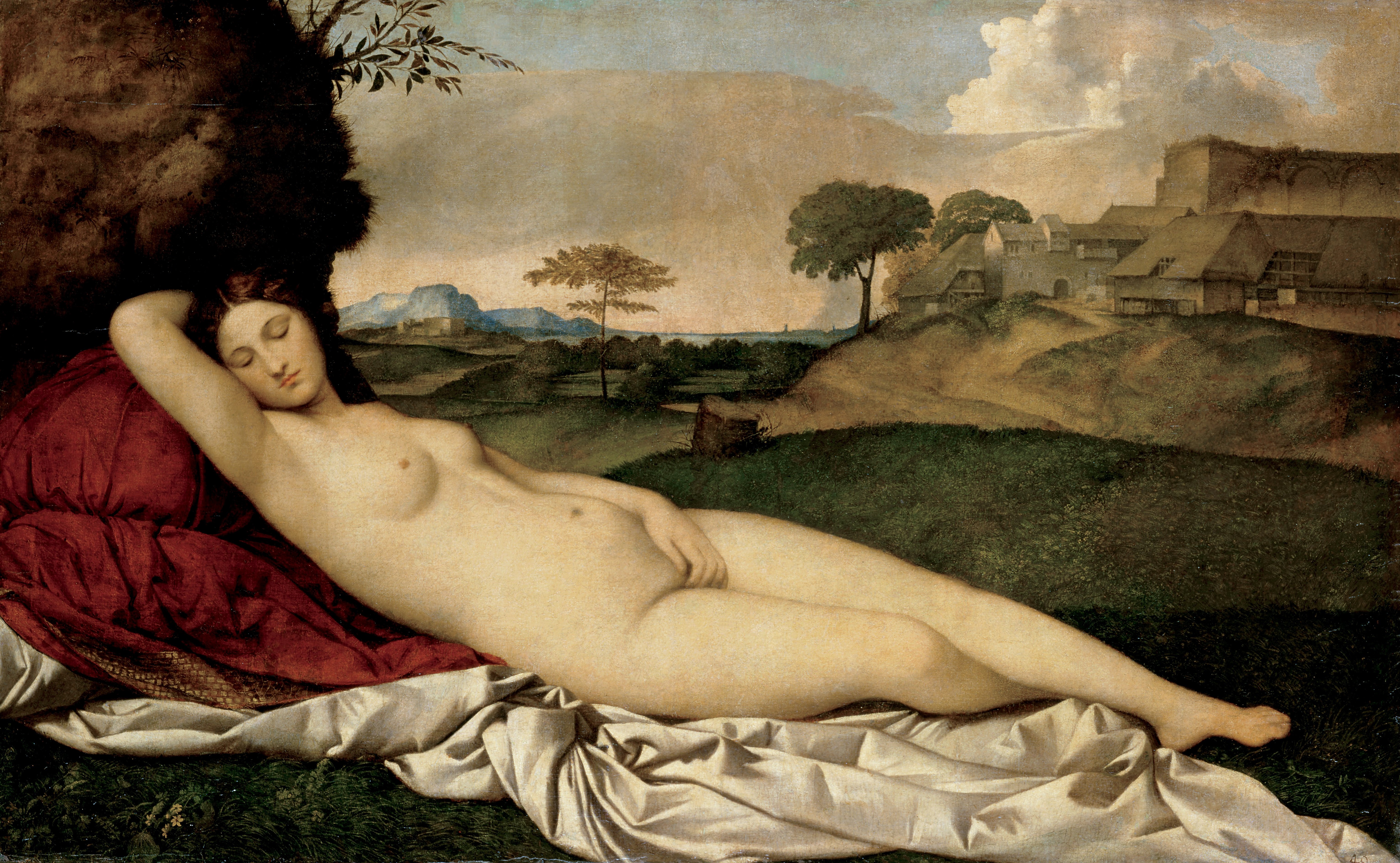
Dresden Venus (c. 1510–11), traditionally attributed to Giorgione but for which Titian completed at least the landscape.

=== Description ===
The painting's subject stares straight at the viewer, not embarrassed by her nudity. In her right hand, she holds a posy of roses, while she holds her other hand over her genitals. In the near background is a dog, often a symbol of fidelity. In a different space in the background two maids are shown rummaging through a cassone chest, where clothes were often kept.

=== Commission ===
The detailed depiction of the interior setting is unusual, perhaps unique, for a Titian painting. Titian did work for the 21-year-old Ippolito de' Medici, reluctantly made a cardinal (though not a priest) by his uncle, Pope Clement VII. He was trying to pursue a military career, and was a papal diplomat. On 20 October 1532, he spent the night in Venice with Angela del Moro, or Angela Zaffetta, a leading courtesan in Venice and occasional dining companion of Titian and Aretino, the latter a friend of the cardinal. Titian painted Ippolito's portrait, and it seems likely that he was asked to add a nude portrait of Angela Zaffetta, or that Titian decided to paint one in the hope he would like it.

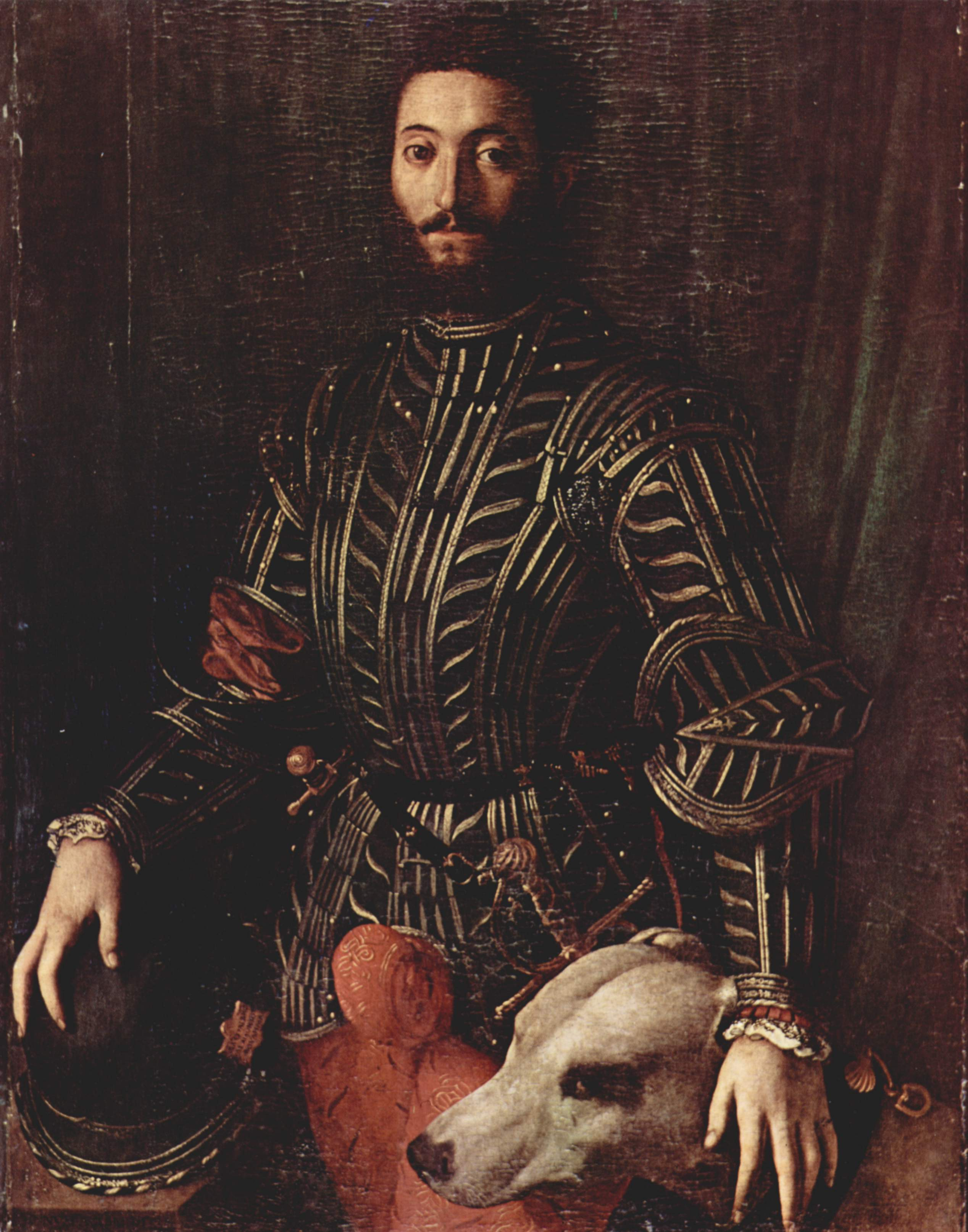
Guidobaldo II della Rovere, Duke of Urbino, after whose duchy the painting gets its most common title.

On 20 December 1534, Titian wrote to Ippolito's chamberlain in Rome saying that he had been working on a painting of a woman for the cardinal. Ippolito died in August 1535, and apparently never saw the painting, which was still in Titian's studio when Guidobaldo II della Rovere, the 24-year-old son of the Duke of Urbino came in January 1538 to sit for a portrait. As letters from him and his mother show, he was extremely keen to buy it, and did so some months later; he referred to it simply as "the nude woman", and was worried Titian would sell it to someone else. Later that year he inherited the Duchy of Urbino on the death of his father, hence the painting acquired the name by which it is most commonly known, although it seems it was mostly kept in Pesaro. Alternatively, the painting may have been commissioned by Guidobaldo, possibly to celebrate his marriage in 1534 to the 10-year-old Giulia Varano, which made him Duke of Camerino, or its consummation, which was probably a few years later.

=== Interpretation ===
Some critics have seen references to marriage in details such as the maids at the cassone, where the corredo or trousseau of clothes generally given to the bride by her husband's family were stored. Rona Goffen sees Venus's hand "caressing" her genitals as such a reference, as it was believed at the time that a female "emission" or orgasm was necessary for conception to take place, and female masturbation was therefore allowed only in cases where the male had ejaculated and withdrawn. The production of heirs was of great concern in elite marriages. Even the little dog on the bed has been brought into the argument; an identical dog is shown in Titian's portrait of the duke's mother Eleonora Gonzaga, the reasoning being that the dog identifies the house as a della Rovere home, and that it remains quiet indicates that the viewer is the husband of the woman.

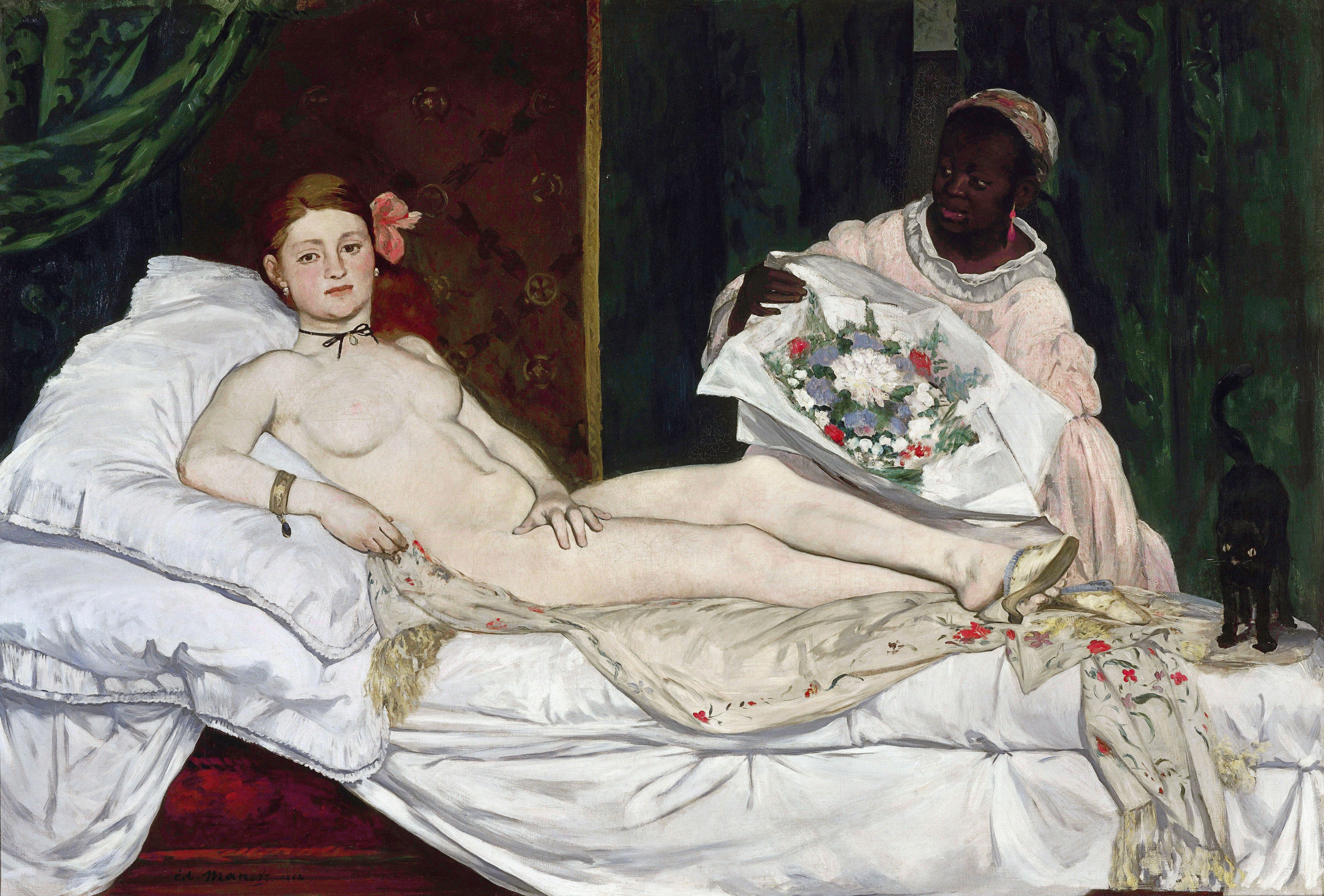
Édouard Manet's Olympia, 1863

A recent theory by Józef Grabski suggests that the painting represents an allegory of marital love between the famous Italian poet Vittoria Colonna and her deceased husband, Fernando d'Ávalos. Grabski supports his theory through analyzing various visual clues and symbols, the most prominent being the classic column in front of the trees in the window in the right half, a small detail on the painting that imitates the Colonna Family coat of arms.

=== Later history ===
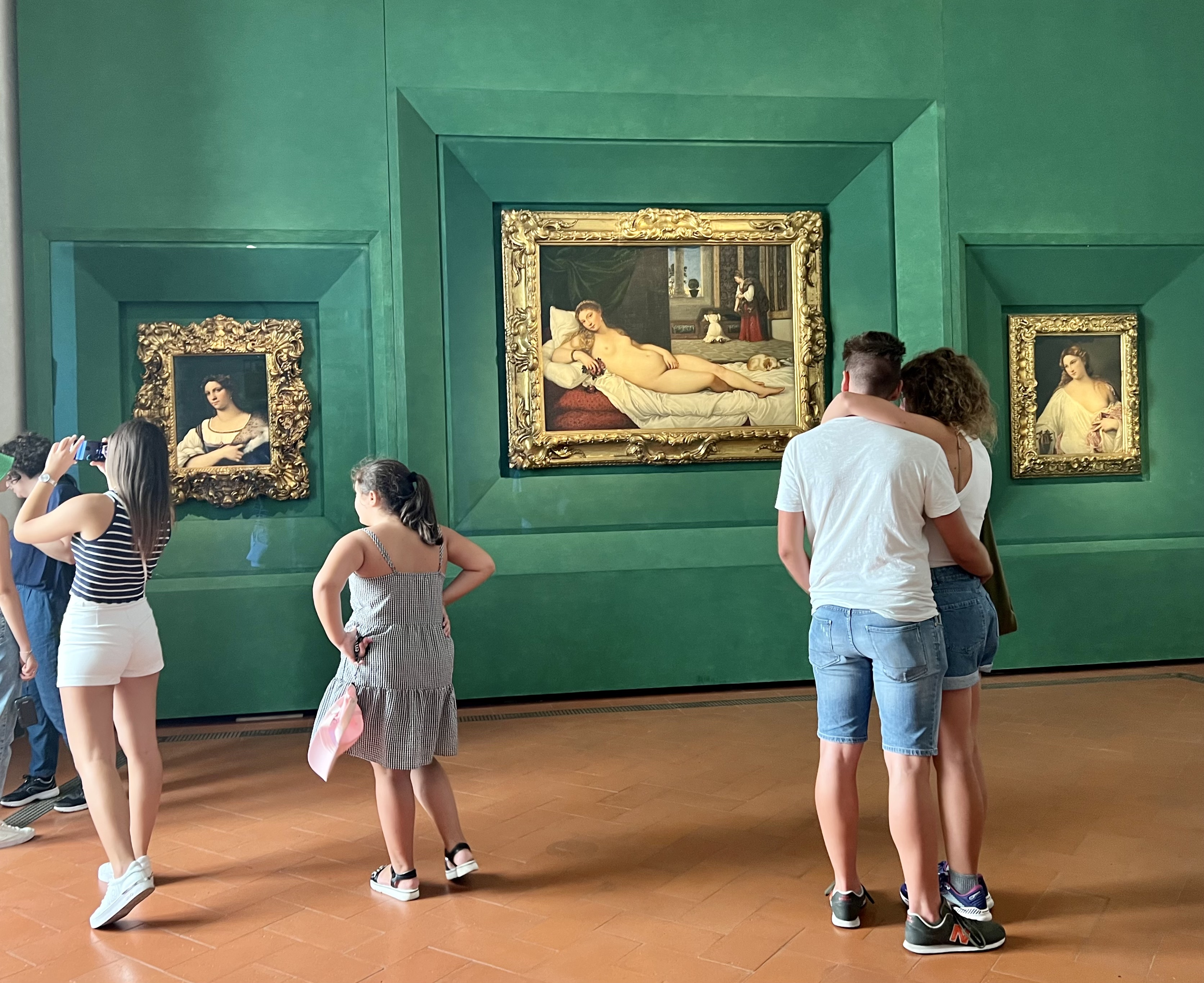
Venus of Urbino displayed at the Uffizi in Florence, Italy

In 1624, as the Papacy moved to fully annex the duchy to the Papal States, the della Rovere court moved to Pesaro, where the painting hung in the Villa Imperiale. It joined the Medici family collections in 1633 when the last della Rovere, Vittoria della Rovere, married Ferdinando II de' Medici, Grand Duke of Tuscany. It was moved to the Uffizi in 1736, and has remained there ever since, apart from visits to exhibitions which in the 21st century have included Madrid, Brussels, Tokyo, Venice, and Urbino. It has long been famous, as is shown by its prominent placing at the front of the gallery group portrait by Johan Zoffany of the Tribuna of the Uffizi of the 1770s.

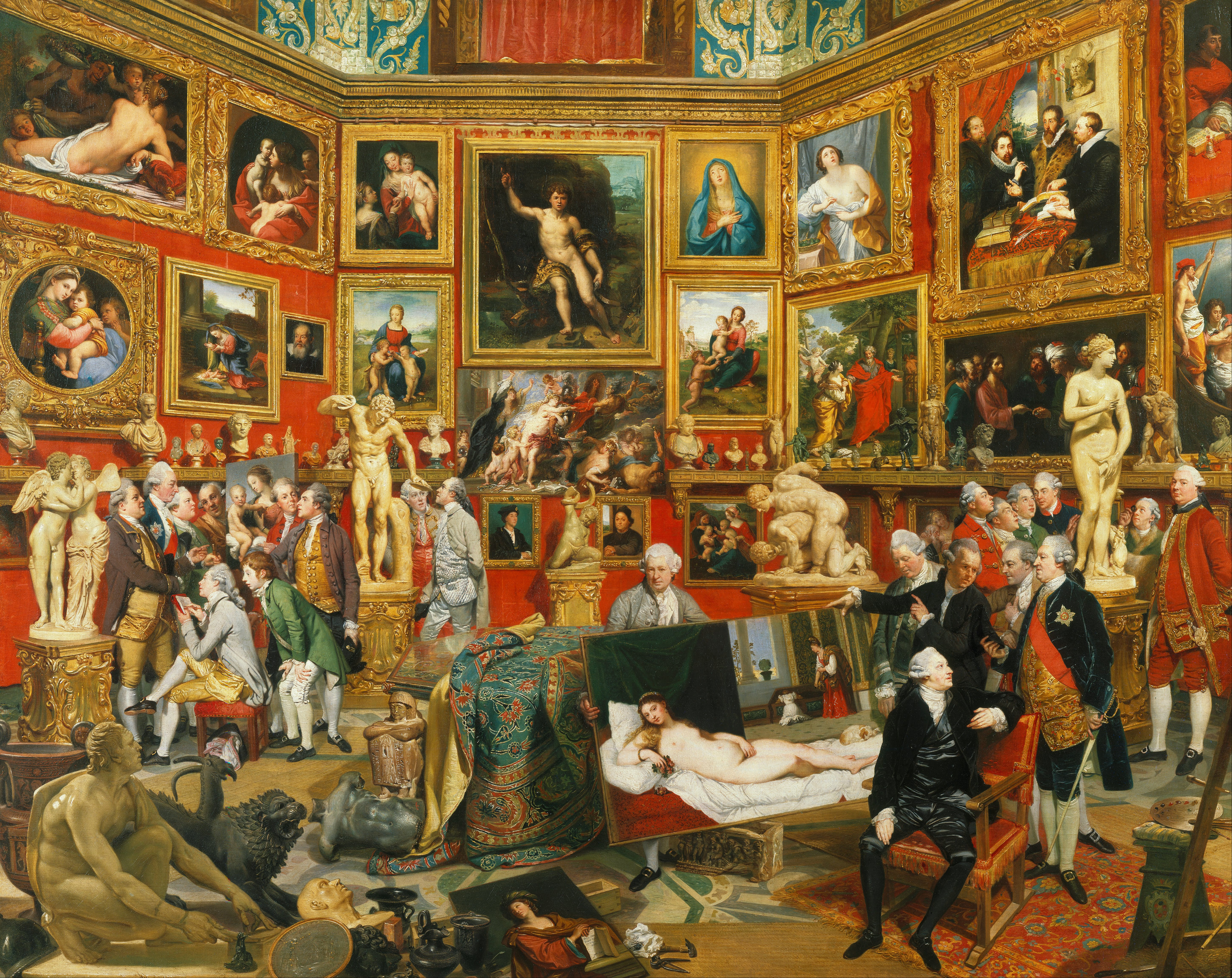
Johan Zoffany, The Tribuna of the Uffizi, 1770s

In his 1880 travelogue A Tramp Abroad, Mark Twain called the Venus of Urbino "the foulest, the vilest, the obscenest picture the world possesses." He proposed that "it was painted for a bagnio [brothel], and it was probably refused because it was a trifle too strong", adding humorously that "in truth, it is a trifle too strong for any place but a public art gallery". Twain does this to juxtapose the artistic license (for nudity, for example) allowed in painting, as opposed to the restrictions and Victorian morality imposed on literature in the "last eighty or ninety years". In the same passage, Twain also mocks the fig leaves placed in the 19th century on nude statues in Rome, which had "stood in innocent nakedness for ages."

The Venus of Urbino was one of the inspirations for Édouard Manet's 1863 Olympia, in which the figure of Venus is replaced with the model Victorine Meurent.

== Sculptures ==
Lorenzo Bartolini developed the same theme in sculpture with his Venus (about 1830), based on the painting that his friend J.A.D. Ingres copied for him from the Titian version. The original sculpture is located at the Musée Fabre in Montpellier; a copy is at the Lady Lever Art Gallery, Port Sunlight, near Liverpool.

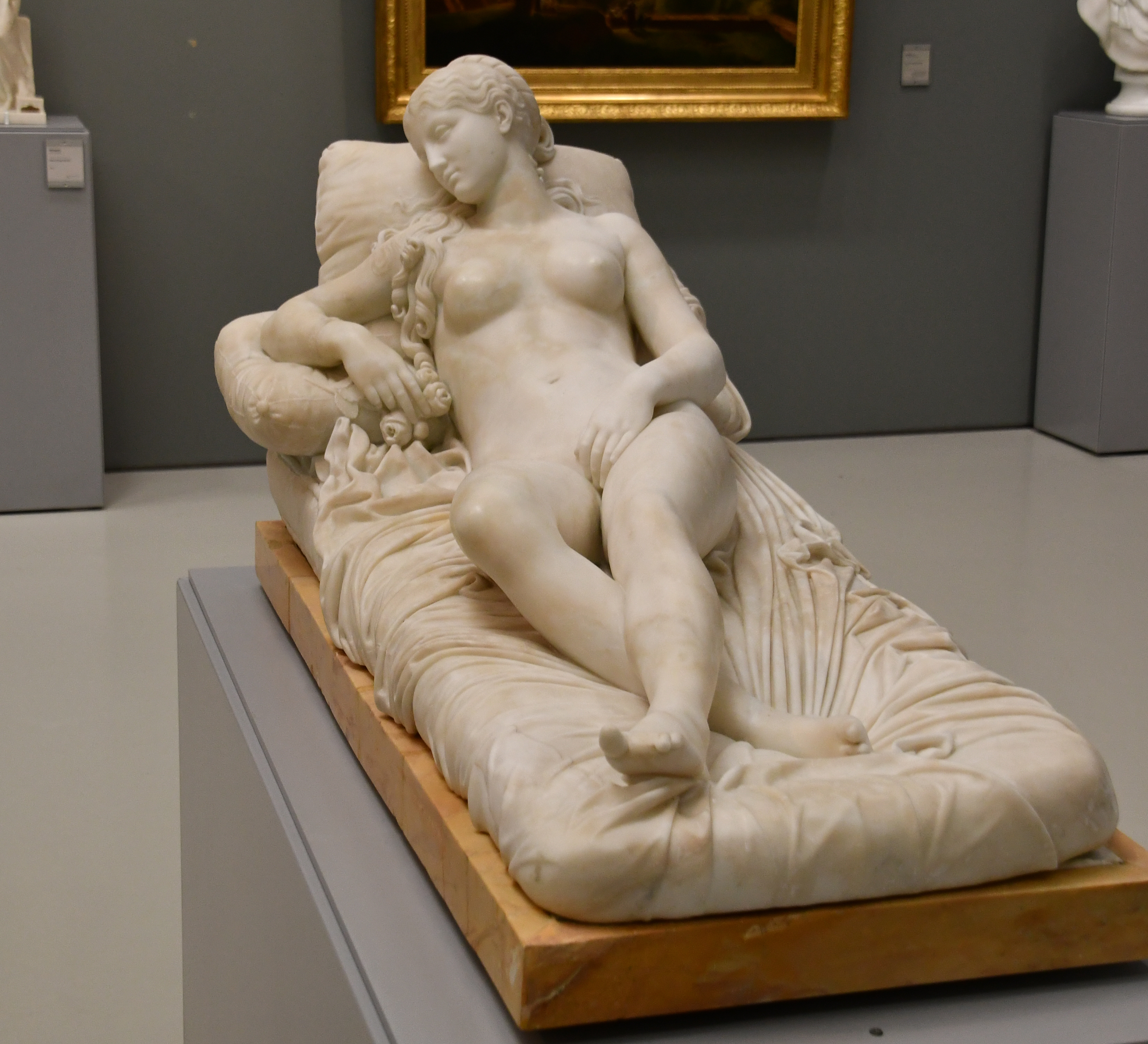
Lorenzo Bartolini, Lying Vénus, 1820–1830, Musée Fabre, Montpellier.

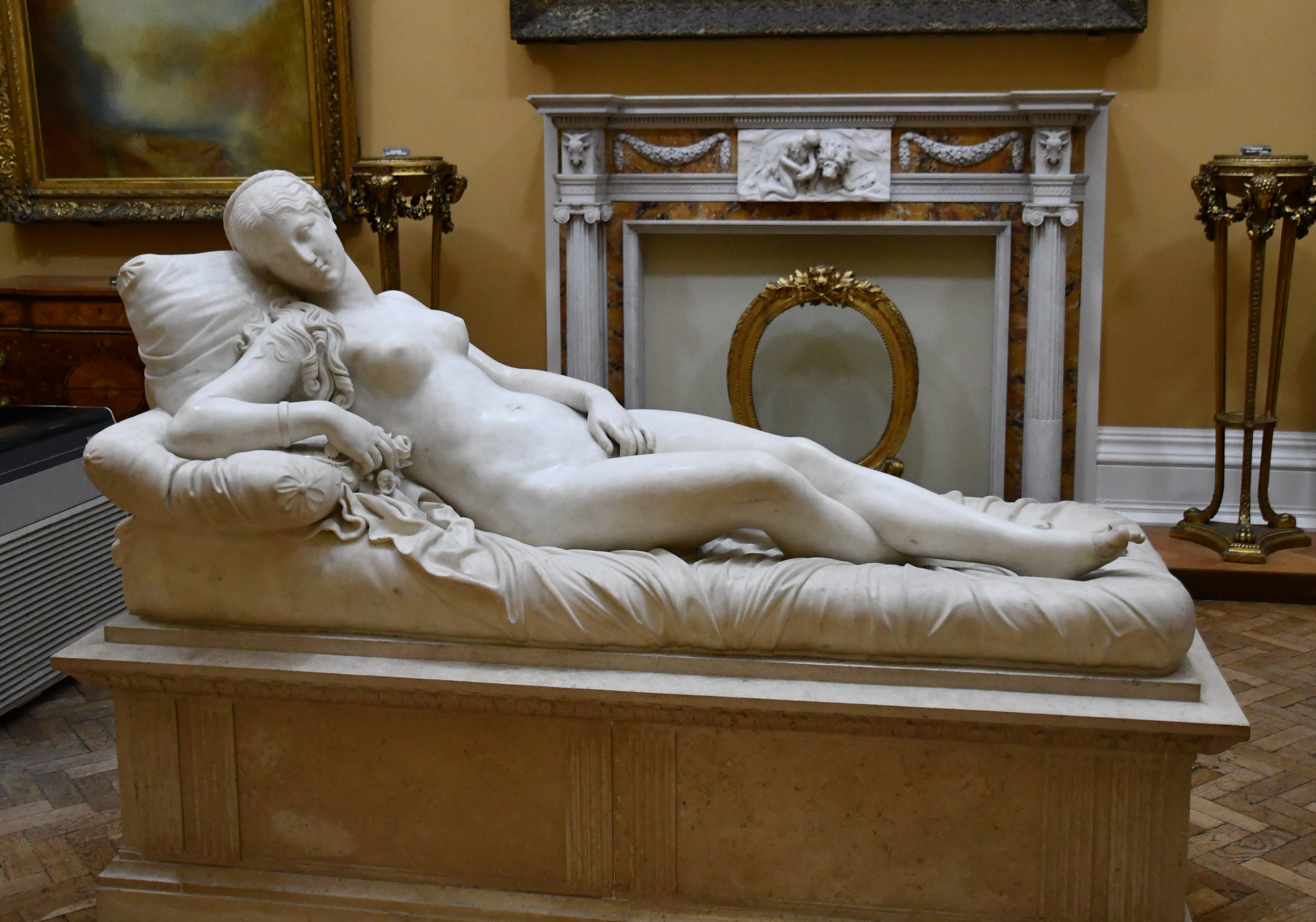
Copy of the Lorenzo Bartolini sculpture at the Lady Lever Art Gallery, Liverpool.

== See also ==
- List of works by Titian
- Renaissance in Urbino
