= Nelson Padovani =

Brazilian politician

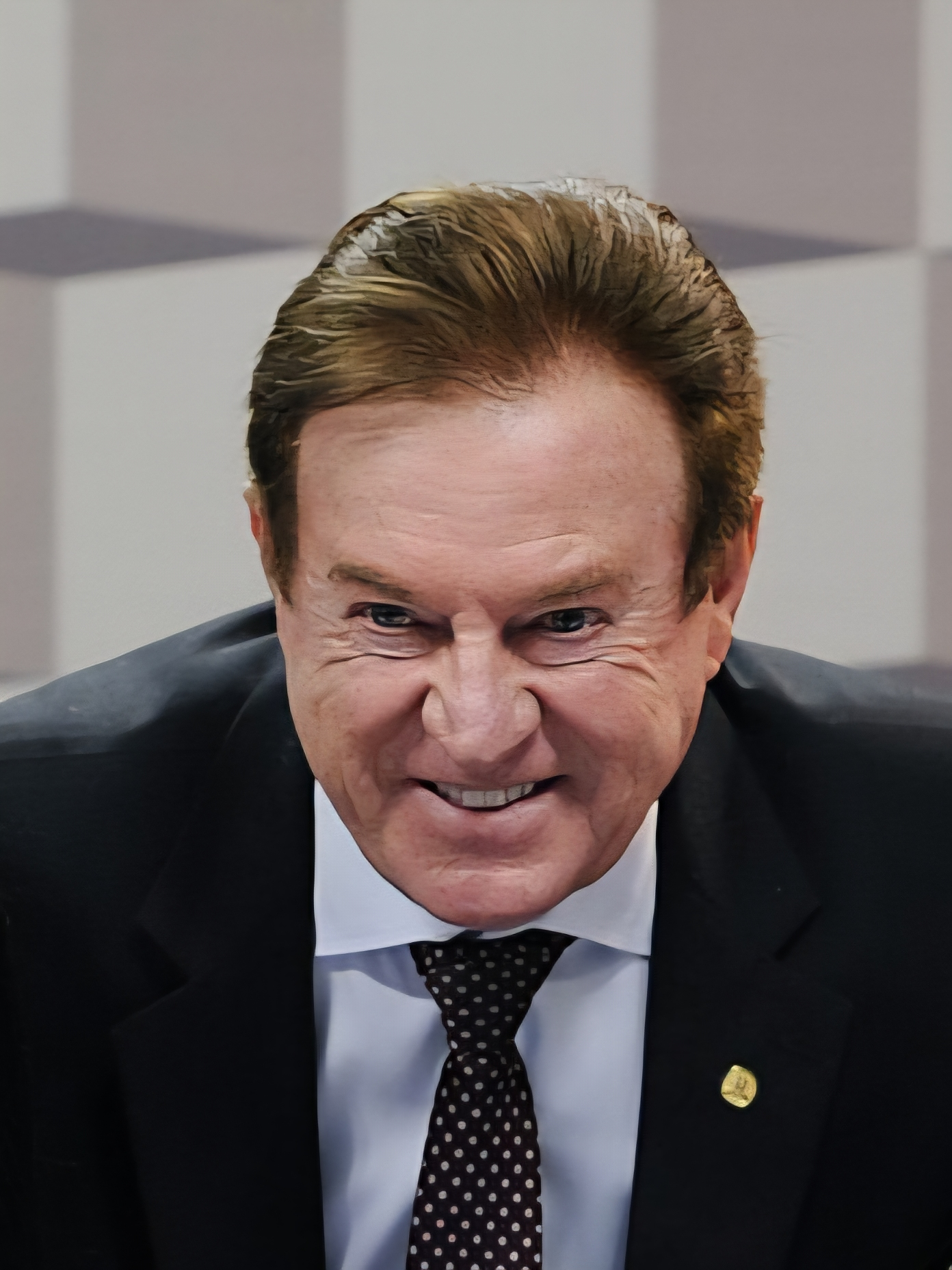
- Nelson Padovani in 2017

Federal deputy of Paraná for the Brazilian Social Democracy Party
- In office February 1, 2011 – January 31, 2015
- Constituency: Paraná
- In office March 16, 2016 – November 1, 2016
- In office January 1, 2017 – April 9, 2018

Personal details
- Born: 17 September 1948 (age 77) Pirapozinho, Brazil
- Party: Brazilian Democratic Movement (1997–2007); Christian Democracy (2007–2009); Social Christian Party (2009–2016); Brazilian Social Democracy Party (2016–present)
- Children: Nelson Fernando Padovani
- Profession: Businessman

Nelson Padovani (born 17 September 1948) is a Brazilian politician who served as a federal deputy for Paraná, for the Brazilian Social Democracy Party.

He entered office in March 2016 as a substitute and third alternate of the Unidos Pelo Paraná coalition.

Short after entering office, Padovani voted to open impeachment proceedings against Dilma Rousseff. Padovani later stepped down on November 1, 2016 until resuming his office again on January 1, 2017.

In August 2017, he voted to dismiss the passive corruption charges against at the time President Michel Temer, whose approval ratings were the worst for a Brazilian president since the military dictatorship. Padovani again stepped down on April 9, 2018.

Padovani has a son with the same name, who is a member of the Chamber of Deputies since 2023.
