= Józef Grabski =

Dr. hab. Józef Grabski (born 1950) is a Polish born art historian, he is also a director of the Institute for Art Historical Research IRSA since its founding in 1979, also a publisher and editor-in-chief of Artibus et Historiae.

== Life and work ==
Grabski was born in 1950 in post-war Warsaw. After attending the Lycée Français in Warsaw (1968), Grabski studied art history at Warsaw University (1968-1972) and graduated under the supervision of Professor Jan Białostocki, specializing in the iconography of Venetian Renaissance painting. Grabski was chosen by Henryk Stażewski (laureate of the Herder Prize in 1972) to be awarded the Herder Prize scholarship. After several scholarships (including the Karolina Lanckorońska scholarship), and research stays at the Fondazione Cini (Venice), Grabski continued to study art history and philosophy at the University of Vienna and gained his Ph.D. in 1976 on the subject of Leon Chwistek and "zones theory," under the supervision of Hermann Filitz and Günter Heinz. He earned his habilitation at the Jagiellonian University. After research stays in Florence at Fondazione R. Longhi, and The Harvard University Center for Italian Renaissance Studies at Villa I Tatti, he wrote numerous publications about Algardi, Donatello, Lorenzo Lotto, Padovano, Tintoretto, and Titian.

With Jan Białostocki, André Chastel, Hermann Fillitz, W. Roger Rearick and Federico Zeri he founded the IRSA Institute for Art Historical Research in 1979 and became its director.

Grabski founded and became editor-in-chief of the scholarly art history journal Artibus et Historiae in 1980, and the IRSA Foundation for Culture Promotion in 2011.

Grabski provided advice, or co-created numerous international collections, for both public institutions and private individuals such as the H. Abel Collection (Munich), the Barbara Piasecka Johnson Collection (Johnson & Johnson, New Jersey), and The Gordon Collection (London).

Grabski has organized numerous exhibitions such as, “Opus Sacrum” (1990, Warsaw, Poland), "École de Paris" (1998, Cracow and Wrocław, Poland), Iwo Zaniewski's "The Beauty of Gentleness", "New Harmony Paintings" (2008, Shanghai, China) and others.

One of the main missions in the work of Józef Grabski is to promote art, culture and history of Central and Eastern Europe, especially Poland, and throughout the world. He organized the "Opening Up" Exhibition of six prominent contemporary Polish artists in the Hammer Galleries (1991, New York), and published on the Lady with an Ermine of Leonardo da Vinci, while it was borrowed to the US for the exhibition "Circa 1492. Art In the Age of Exploration" (1991-1992, National Gallery of Art, Washington). He organized numerous exhibitions in Poland and abroad, for Polish artists such as Alina Szapocznikow, Ryszard Winiarski, Leon Tarasewicz, Jerzy Tchórzewski. Józef Grabski is a board member of public or private institutions promoting art and history in Poland, Ukraine and China and member or the Rotary Club: Cracow.

== Awards and nominations ==
- Herder-scholarship in 1972
- Advisory Board member of the “Podhorce Castle” Foundation, Lvov (Ukraine)
- adviser to the Artistic Events at the Great Wall in China, Beijing in 2014
- Special Prize of the Minister of Culture and National Heritage in recognition of contribution to Polish culture in 2015
- Advisory Board member of the Wawel Royal Castle Museum
- Advisory Board member of the National Museum in Cracow
- Advisory Board member of the Lvov Art Gallery, Lvov, Ukraine
- member of Jury of the Marian Sokołowski Award
- member of Honorary Committee for the Reconstruction of the Tyniec Benedictine Abbey, Poland
- Board member of the Alexandra Exter Association

== Selected publications ==
- “Leon Chwistek und sein ‘Strefismus’ in der Malerei”, Alte und Moderne Kunst, 22, 1977, no. 154–155, pp. 48–51.
- “‘Opus alchemicum’. Treści alchemiczne w renesansowym obrazie weneckim z Muzeum Narodowego w Krakowie. (Rzekome ‘Znalezienie grobu św. Izydora Oracza i jego żony’)”, Biuletyn Historii Sztuki, vol. 41, 1979, no. 1, pp. 43–54.
- “Przedmowa” [preface], in Opus sacrum. Wystawa ze zbiorów Barbary Piaseckiej Johnson, exh. cat. Zamek Królewski w Warszawie, ed. J. Grabski, Warsaw, 1990, pp. 8–9.
- (with Andrzej Rottermund), Kolekcje dzieł sztuki w Polsce, in Opus sacrum. Wystawa ze zbiorów Barbary Piaseckiej Johnson, exhibition catalogue, The Royal Castle, Warsaw, ed. J. Grabski, Warsaw 1990, pp. 14–17.
- “Einleitung zur Ausstellung Opus sacrum”, in Opus sacrum. Europäische Kunst des 13. bis 18. Jahrhunderts aus der Privatsammlung von Barbara Piasecka Johnson, ed. J. Grabski, Liechtensteinische Staatliche Kunstsammlung, Vaduz, 1991, pp. 6–7.
- “Preface”, in Leonardo da Vinci (1452–1519). Lady with an Ermine from the Czartoryski Collection, National Museum, Cracow (publication accompanying the exhibition "Circa 1492. Art in the Age of Exploration", National Gallery of Art, Washington, D.C.), Vienna and Cracow 1991, p. 5.
- (with Jacek Purchla), Introduction, [in:] Jan Vermeer van Delft (1632–1675). St. Praxedis, exhibition catalogue. The Royal Wawel Castle, Vienna – Cracow 1991, p. 5.
- “Twórczość malarska Anny Kostenko”, in Anna Kostenko. Malarstwo, exh. cat. Pałac Sztuki TPSP w Krakowie (Palace of Fine Arts, Cracow, 1998.
- “Przesączyć kolor światem, a linią podkreślić kształt... Europejski rodowód oraz swojska tradycja w twórczości malarskiej Juliusza Joniaka”, [in:] Juliusz Joniak. Malarstwo, exh. cat. Pałac Sztuki TPSP w Krakowie (Palace of Fine Arts, 15 May–14 June 1998, Cracow, 1998, pp. 15–28.
- “Jewish Artists from Poland in the Circle of ‘École de Paris’. Wojciech Fibak's Collection”, [in :] École de Paris. Jewish Artists from Poland. The Wojtek Fibak’s Collection, ed. J. Grabski, exh. cat. Pałac Sztuki TPSP w Krakowie (Palace of Fine Arts, July–August 1998, pp. 7–10.
- “Jewish Artists from Poland in the Circle of ‘École de Paris’. Wojciecha Fibak's Collection”, [in :] École de Paris. Jewish Artists from Poland. The Wojtek Fibak’s Collection, ed. J. Grabski, exh. cat. Pałac Poznańskich – Muzeum Historii Miasta Łodzi (Palace of the Family Poznański Museum of the History of the Łódź City), 1998–1999, pp. 11–14.
- “Jacek Malczewski – nowe aspekty twórczości”, [in:] Jacek Malczewski, Czesław Rzepiński, Juliusz Joniak, Jan Szancenbach – Malarstwo. Wystawa ze zbiorów krakowskich Rotarian i ich rodzin, exh. cat. Pałac Sztuki TPSP w Krakowie (Palace of Fine Arts), Cracow, October 1996; March–May 1999.
- “Wstęp”, [in:] Stasys 50, exh. cat. Pałac Sztuki TPSP w Krakowie (Palace of Fine Arts), ed. J. Grabski, Cracow, 1999, pp. 7–8.
- “Stasys 50”,[in:] Stasys 50, exh. cat. Pałac Sztuki TPSP w Krakowie (Palace of Fine Arts), ed. J. Grabski, Cracow, 1999, pp. 9–17.
- “Wstęp – nowe źródła do badań nad Panoramą Racławicką”, in Mała Panorama Racławicka Wojciecha Kossaka i Jana Styki, exh. cat. in the District Museum [in:] Tarnów; National Museum of the Przemyśl Region in Przemyśl; The Pomeranian Dukes’ Castle in Szczecin; Museum of Upper Silesia, Bytom, 2001–2002, ed. J. Grabski, Cracow, 2001, pp. 7–8.
- “Aleksander Kobzdej’s Struggle with Matter”, in Aleksander Kobzdej. Struggle with Matter, exh. cat. Galeria Polskiego Domu Aukcyjnego “SZTUKA”, ed. J. Grabski, Cracow–Warsaw, 2002, pp. 9–11.
- “Przedmowa”,[in:] Beata Sarapata. Ślady przodków. Malarstwo, exh. cat., ed. J. Grabski, Cracow, 2004, p. 5.
- “The Transmissive Function of the Fine Arts: Some Observations on the Power and Function of Art in the Past and in the Age of Multimedia”, [in:] Transcendence of Arts and the Development of Civilizations (Proceedings of the Conference "Beijing Forum 2008") November 7th–9th, 2008, Beijing, 2008, pp. 85–93.
- “Antonio Canova, Portret młodego Henryka Lubomirskiego / Portrait of Henryk Lubomirski as a Boy”, [in:] Uroda portretu. Polska od Kobera do Witkacego, exh. cat. The Royal Castle in Warsaw, eds. P. Mrozowski, A. Rottermund, Warsaw, 2009, pp. 180–183.
- “ 'Jaki Piękny’. Tchnienie w materię: ból przetwarzania i metamorfozy”, [in:] Bronisław Krzysztof. Rzeźba-medale-szkice-małe formy-obiekty sztuki, Bielsko Biała 2010.
- “Kolekcjonerzy polscy i polskie prywatne zbiory dzieł sztuki na tle kolekcjonerstwa międzynarodowego: przypadki i tendencje”, Kronika Zamkowa, 59–69, 2010, pp. 61–70.
- “Polish Renaissance Art and the Art of the Renaissance in Poland” [约瑟夫·格拉布斯基：波兰的文艺复兴艺术与文艺复兴艺术在波兰的发展], [in:] Poland–China. Art and Cultural Heritage, ed. J. Wasilewska, Cracow, 2011, pp. 37–46.
- The 30th anniversary of the IRSA Institute for Art Historical Research, [in:] History of Art History in Central, Eastern and South-Eastern Europe, vol. II, ed. J. Malinowski, Toruń 2012, pp. 89–93
- “Il ruolo del ritratto nelle opere narrative e religiose di Sebastiano del Piombo: fra Raffaello e Michelangelo”, Konsthistorisk Tidskrift, nr 4, LXXXI, 2012, pp. 238–244.
- “Путь к совершенству: изучение натуры, наследия великих мастеров и оттачивание ремесла. Некоторые источники вдохновения Николая Ивановича Фешина (1881-1995)”. [“Through Practice, Observation of Nature and Great Masters to Perfection. The Sources of Inspiration of Nicolai I. Fechin (1881-1955)”, [in:] Вторые казанские искусствоведческие чтения. К 130-летию со дня рождения Н. И. Фешина. Материалы Международной научно-практической конференции 2-3 ноября 2011 года, Казань 2014, s.8 - 13
- “Jerzy Tchórzewski. Malarz poeta” [in:] Jerzy Tchórzewski, exh. cat., Galeria Opera, The Grand Theatre - National Opera in Warsaw, Warsaw 2015, pp. 5– 21.
- “The Iconography of St. Francis in the Work of El Greco and His Workshop: Typology, Variants, Derivatives“, [in:] Art in the Time of El Greco, red. A. Witko, Cracow 2016, pp. 103–120
- “The Significance of Shape and Colour. Essays on Art, Mostly of the Italian Renaissance", Cracow, 2016
- “Bernini’s Bronze Medallion of Pope Clement X: Some Problems of Workshop and Collaboration”, [in print]
