= Semana Musical Llao Llao =

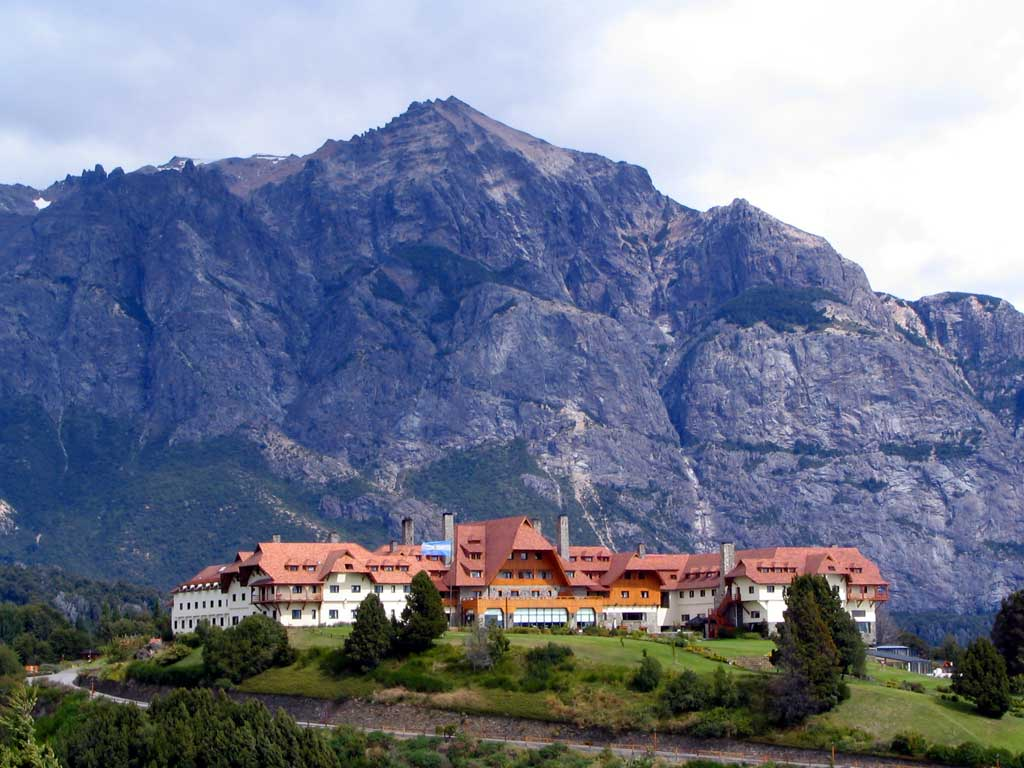
An image of the Llao Llao hotel.

Semana Musical Llao Llao is a classical music festival in Argentina. The festival was created in 1993 and is held at the Llao Llao Hotel, near Bariloche. The Festival breaks through the Argentine tradition, and brings classical music to the foothills of the Andes. The festival is held yearly in October.

== Past Performers ==
- Martha Argerich
- Yousuko Horigome
- la Orquesta Sinfónica Nacional
- Luis Ascot
- Tommy Tichauer
- Guelfo Nally
- University of La Plata Quartet
- Alejandro Drago
- Rafael Gintoli
- Paula Peluso
- Eduardo Hubert
- São Paulo Quartet
- Tartini Chord Quartet
- Akiko Ebi
- Ástor Piazzolla Foundation Quintet

== See also ==
- List of classical music festivals in South America
- List of music festivals in Argentina
