= Artibus et Historiae =

Artibus et Historiae is a semi-annual publication of art historical research published by IRSA (Institute for Art Historical Research) since 1980. It is a scholarly peer review journal embracing a broad range of topics within the field of art history; however, it aims to address interdisciplinary connections at the peripheries of art and other humanistic fields, such as psychology, sociology, philosophy, or literature.

It appears twice a year, in hardback. The articles are in one of four languages: English, Italian, German, or French

Artibus et Historiae is indexed in the Bibliography of the History of Art (BHA) and its articles are deposited in electronic form accessible through JSTOR.

== Title and Logo ==
Artibus et Historiae takes its title from the private experiences of its founder and editor-in-chief, Polish art historian Dr. hab. Józef Grabski. "Artibus" is an inscription on the fronton of an old and very prestigious art exhibition hall, "Zachęta" (Society for Encouragement of Fine Arts, founded in 1860), in his native Warsaw. The second part of the title, "Historiae", is a tribute paid to the Countess Karolina Lanckorońska, professor of art history and editor of Polish historical sources in her own "Institutum Historicum Polonicum" in Rome, Italy.

The logo of IRSA and Artibus et Historiae - a symbolic representation of a winged putto standing firmly on a balance, held in his own hands - comes from a Renaissance painting by Lorenzo Lotto (Portrait of a Man Aged Thirty-Seven. c. 1542 Collection Doria Pamphili, Rome) and symbolizes the Platonic idea of internal equilibrium between the spiritual and the physical aspects of the activities and existence of man.

== History ==
Artibus et Historiae is the primary publication issued by IRSA. The idea of publishing a new art journal was conceived by Dr. Grabski in the late 1970s and realized after the International Congress of Art History (CIHA) in Bologna (1979). Thus IRSA Publishing House was brought into being and the first number of Artibus et Historiae appeared in 1980. It has since continued to feature groundbreaking articles at the forefront of art historical research. In 2019 the periodical will celebrate forty years of international readership.

== Journal Profile ==
Artibus et Historiae presents scholarly contributions to the field of art history addressing a wide-ranging spectrum of topics. Although art history remains the main focus of the journal, many articles address interdisciplinary aspects at the frontiers of art and other humanistic fields, such as psychology, sociology, philosophy, and literature. Likewise, articles are not limited to particular media or form and many address topics in photography or film as well as the theory and reception of art.

Certain works, which due to their length, could not have been published in periodical form, have appeared as volumes in the series from Bibliotheca Artibus et Historiae.
