= Austral Gold =

Mining company

Austral Gold Limited
- Type: Public limited company
- Traded as: ASX: AGD; TSX-V: AGLD; OTCQB: AGLDF
- Industry: Gold and silver mining
- Founded: 1996; 30 years ago in Sydney, Australia (as Diamond Rose NL)
- Headquarters: Level 5, 126 Phillip Street, Sydney, NSW 2000, Australia
- Area served: South America (Argentina, Chile) and United States
- Key people: Eduardo Elsztain (Non-executive Chairman); Stabro Kasaneva (CEO); José Bordogna (CFO)
- Products: Gold, silver
- Parent: Inversiones Financieras del Sur S.A. (IFISA)
- Website: australgold.com

Austral Gold is a mining company engaged in the exploration, development and production of gold and silver, with assets in South America and the United States. The company is dual-listed on the Australian Securities Exchange (ASX: AGD) and the TSX Venture Exchange (TSX-V: AGLD), and is headquartered in Sydney, Australia.

Its primary operating assets are the Guanaco-Amancaya mine in northern Chile and the Casposo-Manantiales mine in the province of San Juan, Argentina. The company also holds exploration projects in the province of Santa Cruz (Argentina), the Paleocene Belt (Chile), and in the states of Nevada and Utah (United States).

The company's controlling shareholder is Inversiones Financieras del Sur S.A. (IFISA), an entity linked to Argentine businessman Eduardo Elsztain.

== History ==
=== Origins ===
Austral Gold was originally incorporated under the name Diamond Rose NL in October 1996 and began trading on the Australian Securities Exchange on 18 April 1997. In November 2006, the company changed its name to Austral Gold Limited as part of a strategic shift towards the exploration and production of precious metals in the Southern Hemisphere.

=== Entry into the Latin American market ===
In 2009, Argentine businessman Eduardo Elsztain joined the board of Austral Gold in a non-executive capacity.

In 2011, Austral Gold started operations at the Guanaco mine, a gold and silver deposit located 220 kilometres southeast of the city of Antofagasta, in the Antofagasta Region, Chile.

In 2013, the company acquired a 15% stake in Goldrock Mines Corp., holder of the Lindero gold project in the province of Salta, Argentina, through a private placement of CA$9.28 million. That same year, it purchased a 19.9% interest in Argentex Mining, holder of the Pingüino project in Santa Cruz.

In 2014, Austral Gold took control of a 51% stake in the mining services company Humberto Reyes and the Amancaya project, both located in Chile.

In 2016, the company completed the acquisition of 100% of Argentex Mining—holder of the Pingüino project, a polymetallic deposit containing gold, silver, zinc, lead and indium in Santa Cruz—for approximately CA$5.8 million. That same year, Austral Gold reached an agreement with Troy Resources to acquire 70% of the Casposo project, located in the department of Calingasta, San Juan: it initially acquired a 51% interest for US$1 million, with an option to purchase the remaining 19% at the same price within twelve months, an option it subsequently exercised.

In 2017, the company added the San Guillermo and Reprado projects to its portfolio—both adjacent to the Amancaya complex in Chile—acquiring them from Revelo Resources.

=== Consolidation and restructuring ===
In April 2019, Austral Gold placed the Casposo mine on care and maintenance due to lower-than-projected silver prices and below-expected production levels. In November of that year, the company completed the acquisition of the remaining 30% of Casposo, reaching 100% ownership of the project. In December 2019, the company acquired an initial 22.48% interest in the Rawhide mine, a gold and silver deposit in the state of Nevada, for US$3.9 million, of which US$2 million were paid in cash at closing.

In 2020, Austral Gold completed its dual listing on the TSX Venture Exchange (TSX-V: AGLD), expanding its visibility among North American investors. That year, the company also entered into a partnership with Canadian miner Yamana Gold to explore the Suyai gold project near Esquel, in the province of Chubut.

In April 2023, Elsztain became the majority shareholder (12.7%) of Australian company Challenger Gold, which is developing the Hualilán gold project in the department of Ullum, San Juan. The investment was made through IFISA, with a contribution of AU$6.6 million.

In late 2024, Austral Gold and Challenger Gold signed a strategic agreement under which the Casposo processing plant would handle approximately 150,000 tonnes of ore per year from the Hualilán project. To finance the upgrading of the facilities, Elsztain secured a US$7 million loan from the Banco de San Juan.

Following the completion of a reserve update and the corresponding technical report, in October 2025 Austral Gold announced the restart of commercial production at Casposo, with certified reserves of approximately 80,000 ounces of gold and 3 million ounces of silver and a projected mine life of six years on its own ore. The company expanded its workforce to 116 direct and 100 indirect jobs at the site.

In July 2025, Austral Gold held the first session of a training programme for mineral processing plant operators at the Calingasta Neighbourhood Union.

== Assets and operations ==
=== Guanaco-Amancaya mine (Chile) ===
The Guanaco-Amancaya complex is located approximately 220 kilometres southeast of the city of Antofagasta, in the Antofagasta Region, Chile. Austral Gold operates it through its Chilean subsidiary Guanaco Compañía Minera SpA.

=== Casposo-Manantiales mine (Argentina) ===
The Casposo-Manantiales project is located in the department of Calingasta, province of San Juan, Argentina, covering an area of 100.21 square kilometres. It is a low-sulphidation epithermal deposit containing gold and silver. Acquired progressively between 2016 and 2019, the project was placed on care and maintenance in the latter year and restarted in 2025 following plant refurbishment works begun in 2024. Proven and probable reserves amount to approximately 80,000 recoverable ounces of gold and 3.276 million ounces of silver, with an estimated mine life of 74 months. In addition to processing its own ore, the Casposo plant will process ore from the Hualilán project, operated by Challenger Gold.

=== Exploration projects in Argentina ===
In the province of Santa Cruz, Austral Gold acquired the Pingüino project in 2016—a polymetallic deposit containing silver, gold, zinc, lead and indium—through the purchase of Argentex Mining Corporation. In 2022, the company sold the Pingüino project to E2 Metals for a total consideration of approximately US$10 million in cash and shares, retaining a 19.9% equity interest in that company.

The Sierra Blanca project, also in Santa Cruz, was transferred to Unico Silver Limited in May 2024, a company in which Austral Gold retains a minority equity interest.

Argentina's mining sector has been subject to regulatory changes since 2024, including the elimination of export duties on gold and the introduction of the Law of Bases and Starting Points for the Freedom of Argentines and the creation of the Large Investment Incentive Scheme (Régimen de Incentivo a las Grandes Inversiones, RIGI), promoted by the national government from 2024 onwards.

=== United States assets ===
In 2019, Austral Gold acquired a minority interest in Rawhide Acquisition Holding LLC, the entity holding the Rawhide mine, a gold and silver deposit in the state of Nevada. In December 2023, Rawhide Mining LLC filed for protection under Chapter 11 of the United States Bankruptcy Code, a process that was still ongoing at the time of writing.

The company also holds a minority equity interest in Ensign Minerals Inc., which owns the Mercur exploration project in the state of Utah.

=== Associated equity interests ===
Through IFISA and the network of companies within the Elsztain group, Austral Gold holds a controlling interest in Argenta Silver—the project's principal shareholder—which owns the El Quevar silver project in the province of Salta, and a 12.7% stake in Challenger Gold, holder of the Hualilán project in San Juan, with estimated resources of 2.8 million gold-equivalent ounces.
