= Padovani =

Padovani is a surname. Notable people with the surname include:

- Padovani (politician) (born 1977), Brazilian politician
- Aurelio Padovani (1889–1926), Italian politician
- Edoardo Padovani (born 1993), Italian rugby player
- Gigi Padovani (born 1953), Italian journalist
- Giovanni Padovani (c. 1512–?), Italian mathematician and astronomer
- Henry Padovani (born 1952), French musician
- Jacqueline Padovani Grima, Maltese judge
- Jean-Daniel Padovani (born 1980), French footballer
- Jean-Marc Padovani (born 1956), French jazz saxophonist, composer, and arranger
- Lea Padovani (1920–1991), Italian actress
- Michel Padovani (born 1962), French football player and manager
- Romain Padovani (born 1989), French footballer

== See also ==
- Padua
