= Llao Llao Hotel =

Resort in Argentina

Llao Llao
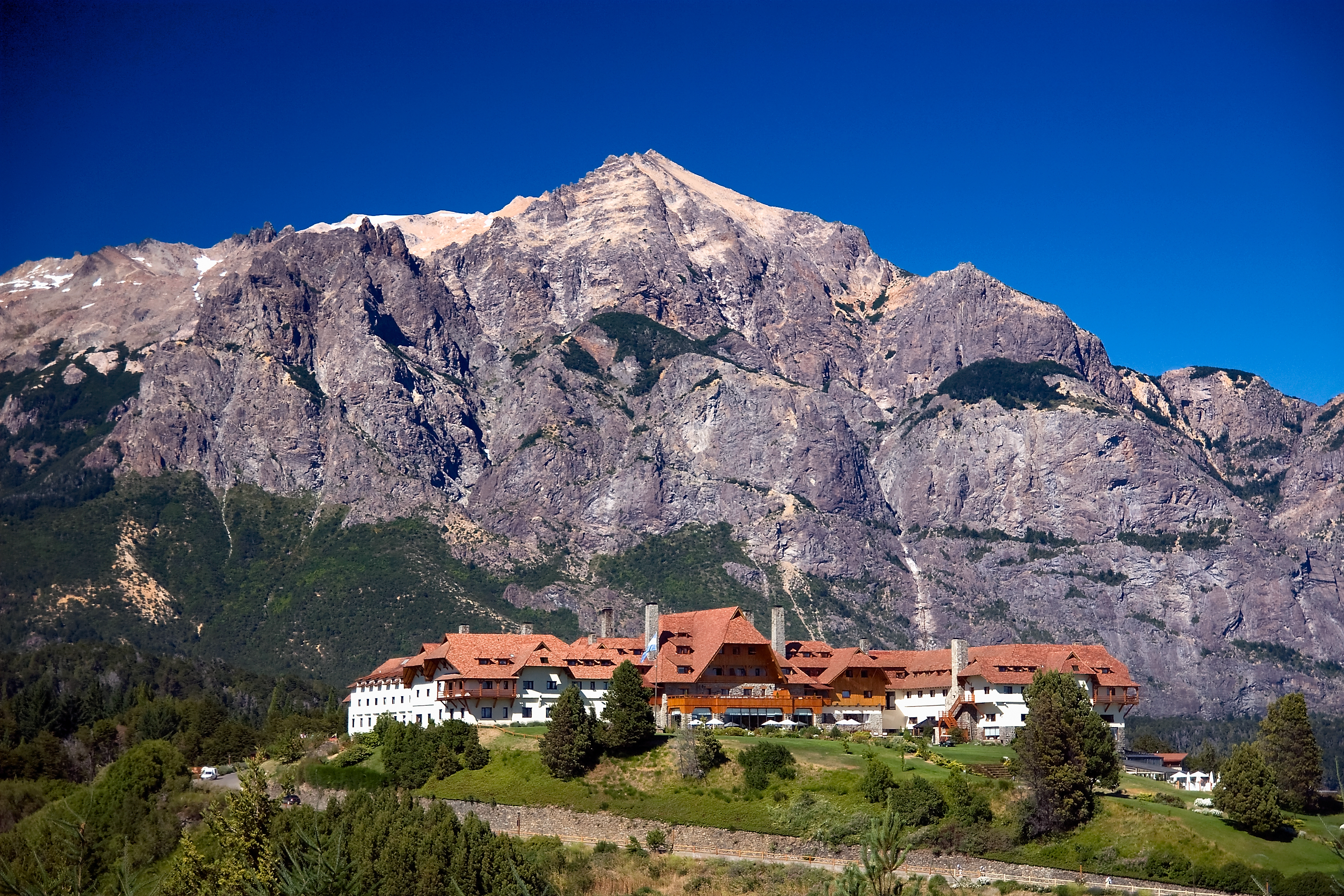
- Setting of the Llao Llao hotel

General information
- Location: Bariloche, Argentina
- Coordinates: 41°3′27.72″S 71°31′52.02″W
- Opening: 1940
- Operator: Llao Llao Resorts S.A.

Technical details
- Floor count: 5

Design and construction
- Developer: Alejandro Bustillo

Other information
- Number of rooms: 205
- Number of suites: 32
- Number of restaurants: 4

Website
- www.llaollao.com

The Llao Llao Hotel is located in the tourist resort of San Carlos de Bariloche within the Río Negro, Argentina. The hotel is situated in the foothills of the Andes on a hill between the Moreno Lake and Nahuel Huapi lakes.

The hotel is owned equally by the Sutton Dabbah Group and the IRSA Group.

Its name comes from a fungus that is very common in the region, the llao llao, which grows attached to ñire and coihue trees.

== History ==
The original hotel, designed by Alejandro Bustillo, was made almost entirely of wood and furnished by Jean-Michel Frank and Casa Comte, was destroyed by fire soon after its completion in 1939. The hotel reopened on December 15, 1940.

A year later Bustillo built a new hotel out of reinforced concrete and stone, with the assistance of the German landscaping architect Hermann Botrich. It closed in 1976 due to lack of funds for maintenance. While it was closed, the hotel was exposed to robbery, vandalism and overall neglect.

It was renovated and reopened in 1993 after ownership was transferred to CEI Citicorp Holdings in compensation for Argentina government bonds. In the late 1990s, IRSA, an Argentine company led by Eduardo Elsztain, bought the hotel from CEI Citicorp Holdings. However, in 2000, IRSA sold 50 percent of the equity in the hotel to the Sutton Group, thus forming the joint venture known as Llao-Llao Resorts, where the Sutton Group manages the hotel.

In 1999 the hotel became a member of The Leading Hotels of the World, and has won many important prizes since its re-opening, including "The Best Hotel and Resort in the Argentine Hinterland" in 1999.

== Activities ==
The hotel is the site of the annual classical music festival, Semana Musical Llao Llao.

Since 2012, the hotel has become the venue for the Llao Llao Forum, which is held annually by the Llao Llao Forum Foundation, with the participation of businessmen, entrepreneurs, politicians, and intellectuals. The idea emerged in response to the eruption of the Puyehue volcano in 2011, with Eduardo Elsztain inviting the Endeavor Foundation to hold their meeting at the hotel. The forum brings together between 70 and 100 participants for three days, with voluntary donations from its members.

== See also ==
- San Carlos de Bariloche
- Nahuel Huapi National Park
