= Paulina Gamus =

Venezuelan politician (1937–2025)

Personal details
- Born: Paulina Gamus Gallegos; 11 January 1937 Caracas, Venezuela
- Died: 11 July 2025 (aged 88) Caracas, Venezuela
- Party: Democratic Action

Paulina Gamus Gallegos (Spanish: [pauˈlina ˈɣamuz ɣaˈʎeɣos]; 11 January 1937 – 11 July 2025) was a Venezuelan politician and lawyer. During her career she held several governmental positions, most notably as a member of the Congress of Venezuela and as Minister of Culture. Gamus was the only Venezuelan Jew to be a member of the Chamber of Deputies.

== Career ==
She was born in the city of Caracas, into a Jewish Sephardic family. Her parents had arrived in Venezuela in 1929, her father from Aleppo and her mother from Thessaloniki. They met there, married, and built a family of five children, though only she — the eldest — went on to have a significant career in party politics and public life. She headed the Juvenile Division of the Technical Judicial Police (PTJ), the predecessor of the current Scientific, Penal and Criminalistics Investigations Corps (CICPC), where she served for nine years.

She was appointed deputy leader of the Democratic Action parliamentary caucus in 1984 and served as Deputy Minister of Information and Tourism. She also served as Minister of Culture, as president of the National Council of Culture (Conac) between 1986 and 1989, and as senator for Cojedes State.

In July 2018 she published her memoirs in a book titled Permítanme Contarles (Editorial Dahbar, 2018), in which she recounts her entry into Venezuelan politics at the age of 31 and her eventual departure from it at 68.

Gamus died on 11 July 2025, at the age of 88.
