= Padovani (politician) =

Brazilian politician (born 1977)

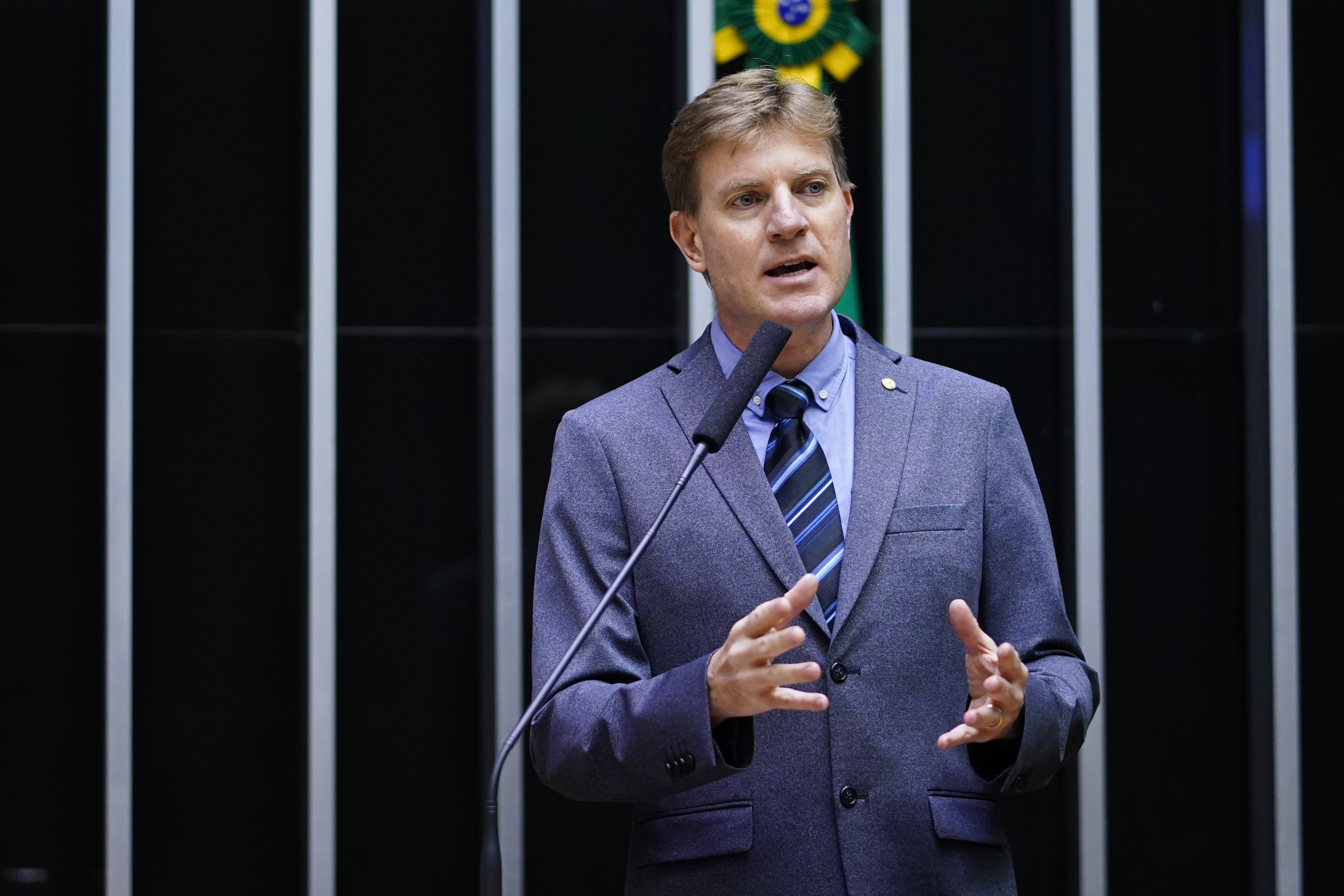
- Padovani in 2023

Member of the Chamber of Deputies
- Incumbent
- Assumed office 1 February 2023
- Constituency: Paraná

Personal details
- Born: 29 October 1977 (age 48)
- Party: Brazil Union (since 2022)
- Parent: Nelson Padovani (father)

Nelson Fernando Padovani (born 29 October 1977), known mononymously as Padovani, is a Brazilian politician serving as a member of the Chamber of Deputies since 2023. He is the son of Nelson Padovani.
