= Carmen Steffens =

Brazilian company

Carmen Steffens Franquias Ltda
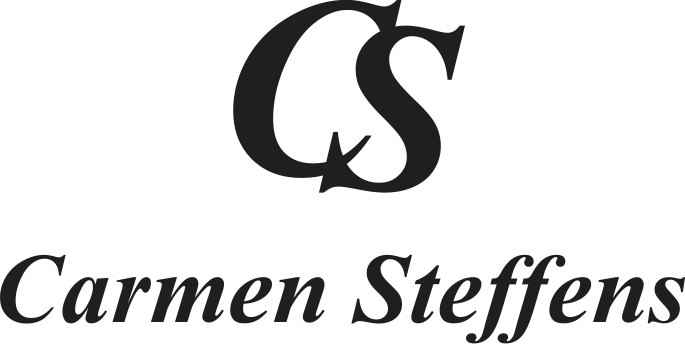

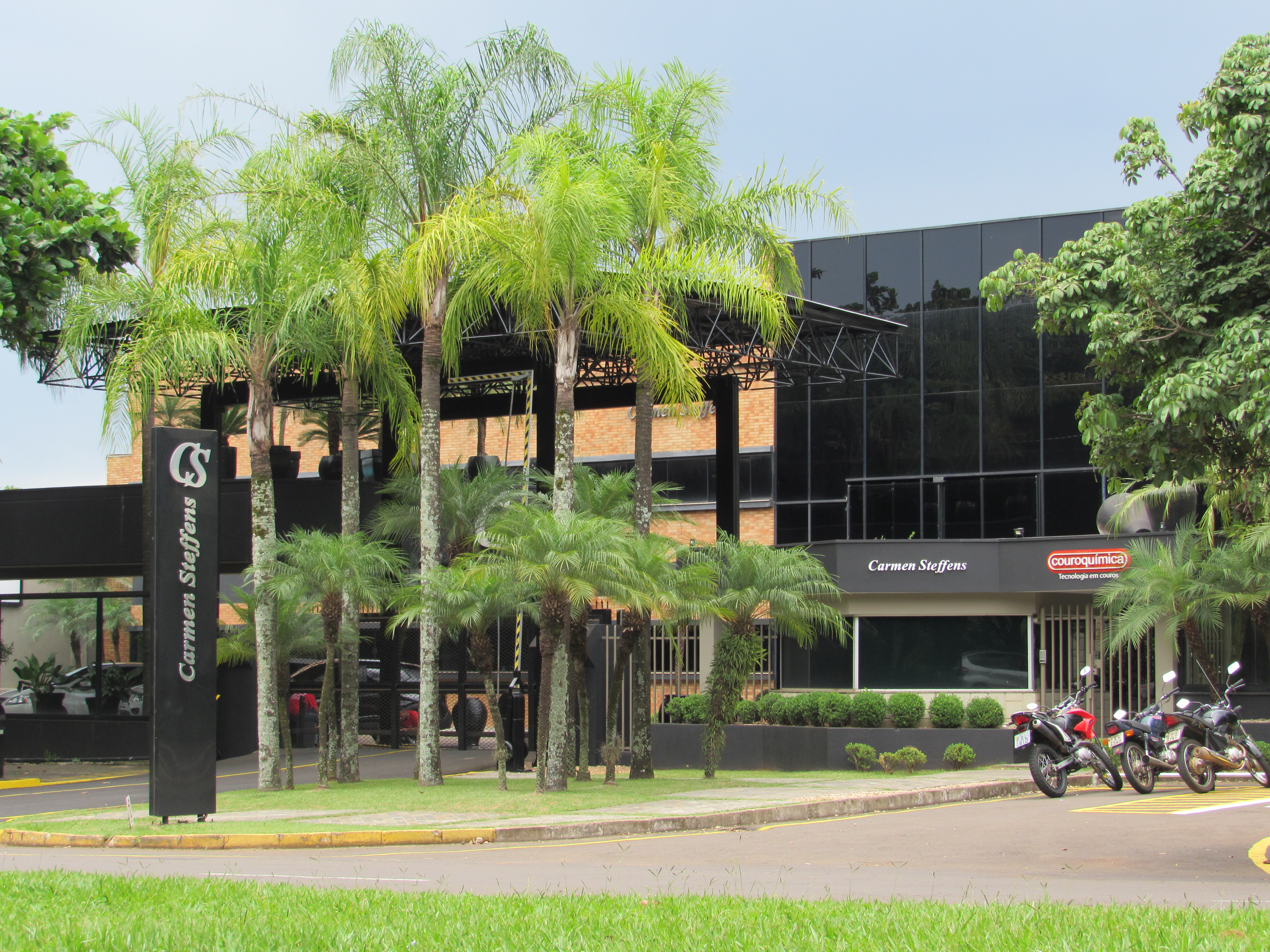
- Carmen Steffens factory
- Type: Public
- Industry: Apparel; Accessories
- Founded: 1993; 33 years ago
- Founders: Mario Spaniol
- Headquarters: Franca, São Paulo, Brazil
- Area served: Worldwide
- Products: Footwear; Apparel; Accessories
- Revenue: ▲1.2 billion (2015)
- Number of employees: 3,500 (2019)
- Website: carmensteffens.com

Carmen Steffens is a Brazilian company based in Franca, in the interior of São Paulo, founded by Mário Spaniol. They have 560 stores in 19 countries, including the United States, France, Brazil and Argentina.

With more than 3,500 employees, it has the second largest turnover in the bag and footwear industry in Brazil.

Their last campaigns star super model Alessandra Ambrosia and actress Camila Queiroz.
