= IRSA =

IRSA logo

IRSA (Institute for Art Historical Research) primarily operates as a publishing house in the field of scholarly art historical texts. It is the publisher of the international periodical Artibus et Historiae; however, it also publishes important volumes by eminent scholars through its Bibliotheca Artibus et Historiae. Among its publications are exhibition catalogues, artists’ biographies and autobiographies, and even a book of poetry.

In addition to publishing scholarly texts, IRSA organizes research work and exhibitions of historical and contemporary art, to which it supplements catalogues.

Within the framework of its activities, IRSA collaborates with both universities and museums worldwide.

== History ==
Established in 1979 by the Polish art historian Józef Grabski, the Institute was initially based in Venice (1979–1982) and hence the acronym IRSA, Istituto per le Ricerche di Storia dell’Arte. From there it moved to Florence and Vienna, and finally in 1996 to Cracow, Poland.

Dr. Grabski’s initiative to create a new art periodical as the main activity of the institute was the result of what was observed as a lack of an independent and, significantly, interdisciplinary journal dedicated to art history. His idea came to fruition with a group of art historians gathered after the International Congress of the History of Art (CIHA) in Bologna in 1979 and IRSA as an Institute and as a publisher came into being. That same year (but already dated 1980) the first issue of Artibus et Historiae appeared. Since that time the periodical has appeared in uninterrupted sequence on a semi-annual basis.

In 2019 IRSA will celebrate 40 years as an international institute and publishing house.
