= Padovano =

Padovano is an Italian surname meaning "Paduan", "of Padua" or "from Padua". Notable people with the surname include:

- Annibale Padovano (1527–1575), Italian composer and organist
- Antonello Padovano, Italian film director and producer
- Domenico Padovano (1940–2019), Italian Roman Catholic bishop
- Melinda Padovano (born 1987), American professional wrestler
- Michele Padovano (born 1966), Italian footballer
