= Iglesia Presbiteriana San Andrés (Centro) =

Iglesia Presbiteriana San Andrés del Centro
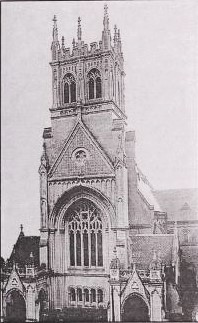
- old image of the original facade of St. Andrew

Religion
- Affiliation: Presbyterian
- Rite: Protestant
- Patron: Andrew the Apostle

Location
- Location: Av. Belgrano 579, Monserrat, Buenos Aires
- Country: Argentina

Architecture
- Architects: Edwin Arthur Merry; Charles Raynes
- Type: neo-Gothic
- Established: 1829
- Completed: 1896

Iglesia Presbiteriana San Andrés del Centro (St. Andrew's Scotch Presbyterian Church) is a Presbyterian church of the city of Buenos Aires. It is located in the vicinity of Otto Wulff building, neighborhood of Monserrat.

== History ==
Originally this church was founded to assist the Scottish community of Buenos Aires, being his first Minister William Brown, who was in charge until 1850. The ancient church was located on Piedras Street, current Avenida de Mayo, neighborhood of Monserrat.

Towards 1890 began the works for the construction of a new church located on Avenida Belgrano, between Peru and Bolivar Streets. The project was entrusted to the British architects, Edwin Arthur Merry and Charles Raynes, who completed the work in 1896. The original tower was demolished in 1950 due to the widening of Belgrano Avenue. His current facade dates from 1962.

Iglesia Presbiteriana San Andrés began to offer services in Spanish since 1912, charge that was entrusted to Minister José Felices, born in Spain.
