= Otto Wulff Building =

Coordinates: 34.6125°S 58.3749°W

Otto Wulff building
- Edificio Otto Wulff
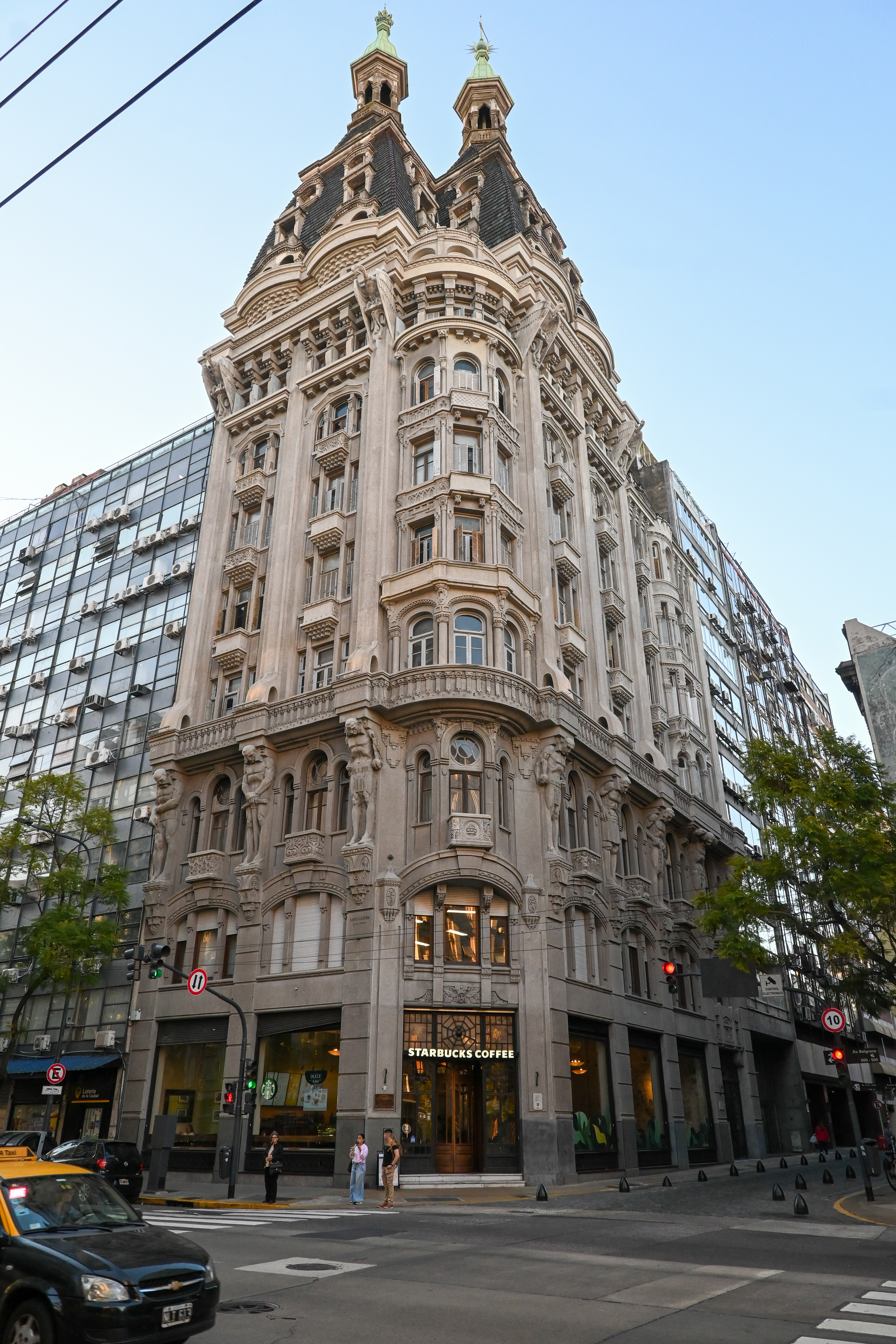
- Interactive map of the Otto Wulff building area

General information
- Architectural style: Art Nouveau
- Location: Avenida Belgrano 601, Buenos Aires, Argentina
- Inaugurated: 1914

Height
- Height: 60 metres (200 ft)

Design and construction
- Architect: Morten Rönnow
- Engineer: Pieter Jacobus Dirks, Willem Hendrik Johannes Dates.
- Main contractor: Otto Wulff

Otto Wulff building (Spanish: Edificio Otto Wulff) is a historic building of Buenos Aires. It is located in the corner of Belgrano and Peru, neighborhood of Monserrat.

This building was built on the grounds of an old colonial house known by the name of "La Casa de la Virreina Vieja", which had been owned by the Viceroy Joaquín del Pino and his family. Around the year of 1910 the lands of this property was acquired by the businessman Otto Wulff, who entrusted the Danish architect Morten Rönnow, the construction of a Jugendstil-style building.
