= Libertador Building =

Government building in Buenos Aires, Argentina

- Edificio Libertador (Spanish)
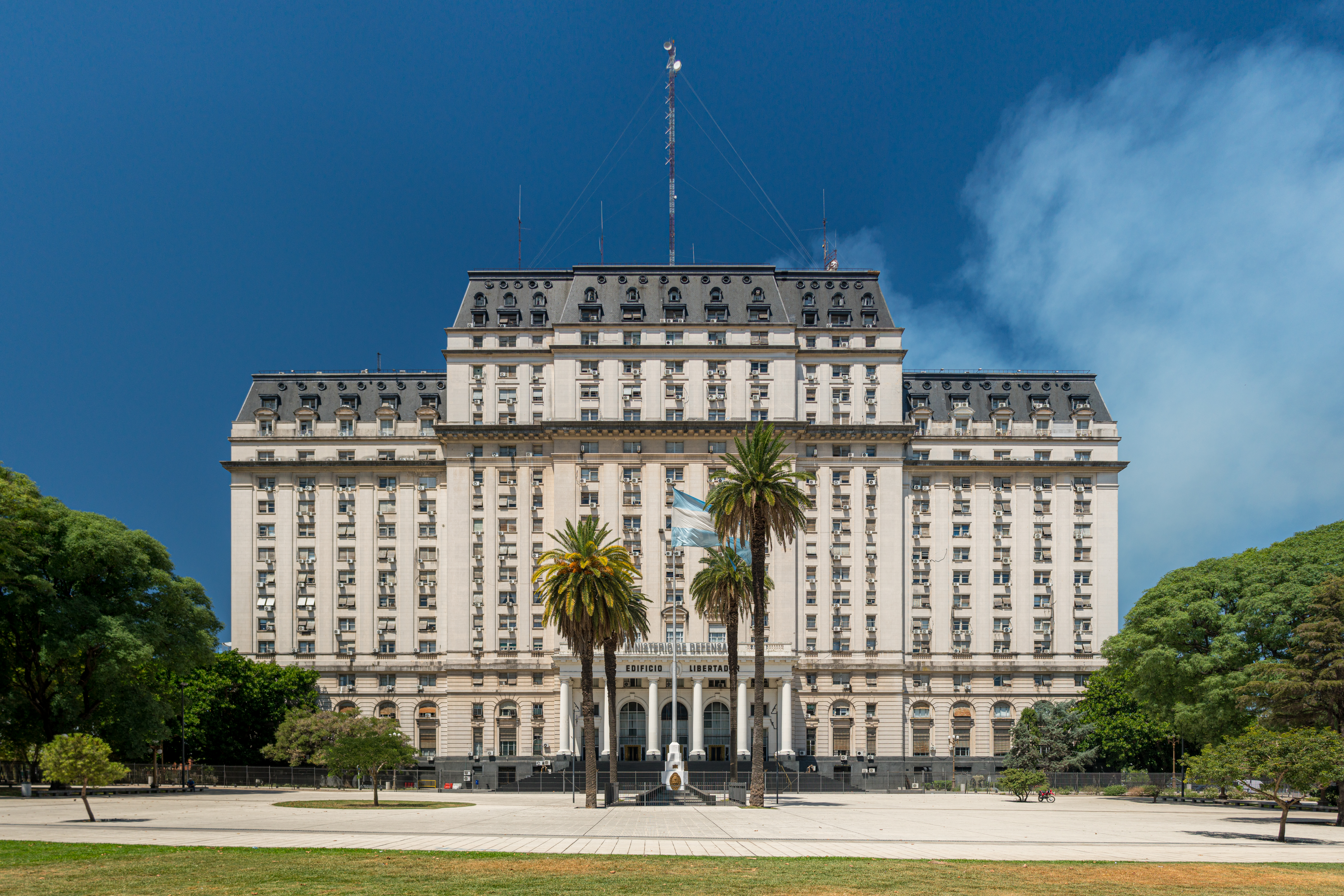
- West façade in 2023.
- Interactive map of the Libertador Building area

General information
- Architectural style: Beaux-Arts; Stripped Classicism
- Location: Azopardo 250, Buenos Aires, Argentina
- Coordinates: 34.609722°S 58.367778°W
- Year built: 1938–1943
- Client: Argentine government
- Owner: Ministry of Defense

Technical details
- Size: 130 m × 60 m (430 ft × 200 ft)
- Floor count: 18
- Floor area: 82,625 m^{2} (889,370 sq ft)

Design and construction
- Architect: Carlos Pibernat

Other information
- Public transit: Underground: Plaza de Mayo, Line A

Website
- www.argentina.gob.ar/defensa

The Libertador Building (Edificio Libertador) is a government building in Buenos Aires, Argentina, housing the Ministry of Defense.

== Overview ==
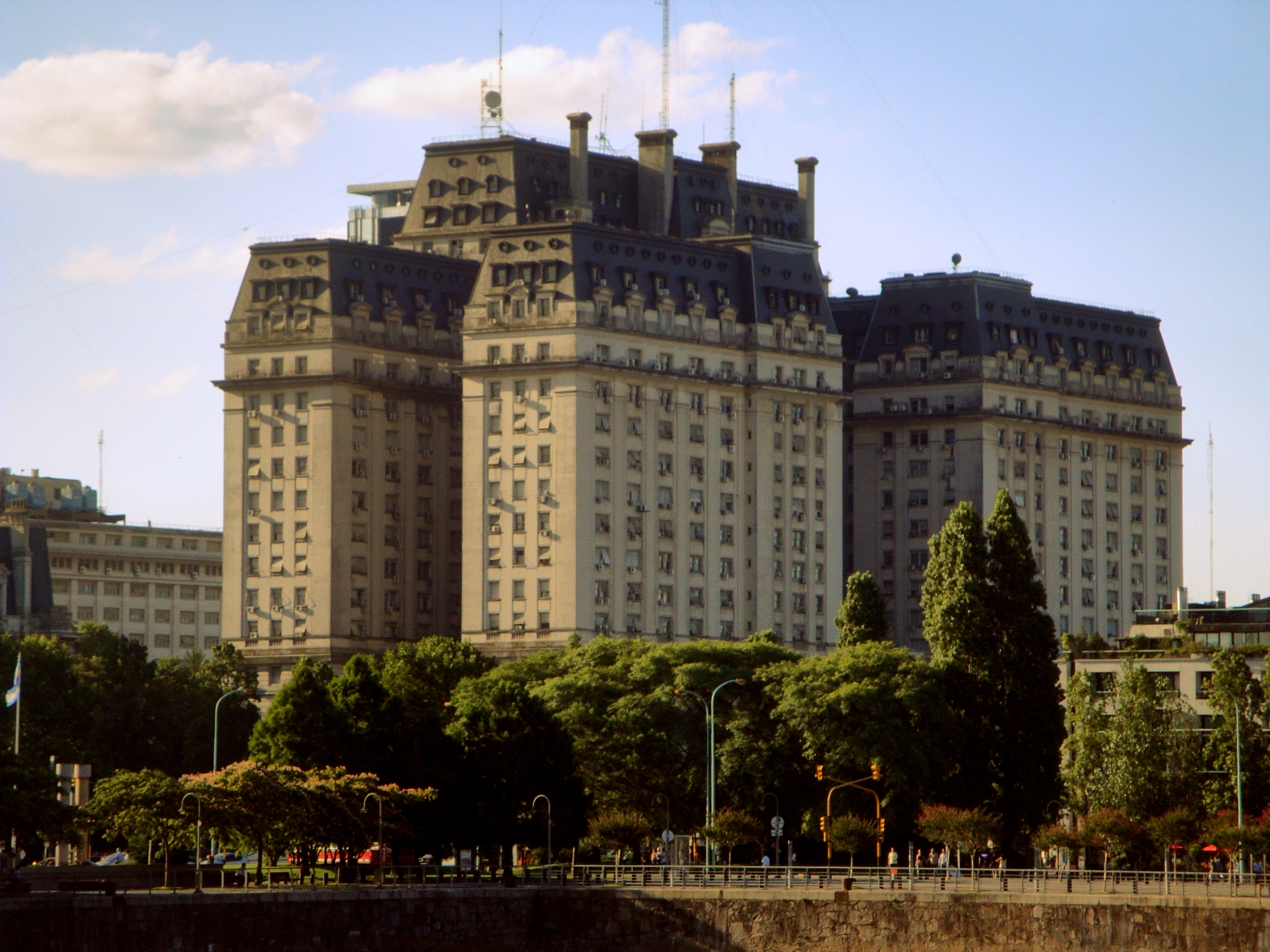
Southeast façade.

The rapidly growing and modernizing Argentine military of the 1920s, whose budget had risen threefold in the decade, lacked a commensurate headquarters, and had been housed since the late 19th century in a Montserrat neighbourhood structure formerly used by the National Mint. Seeking to remedy this, President Agustín Justo (a retired general and former War Minister) ordered the construction of a new War Ministry, and commissioned Carlos Pibernat, chief architect of the General Engineers' Office, for its design.

Pibernat's plans, submitted in 1935, called for twin buildings east and west of the presidential offices at the Casa Rosada. Ultimately, however, these plans were dropped in favor of imposing new headquarters on a 3 ha (8 ac) lot east of the Casa Rosada. Designed by Ministry of Public Works architects Enrique Lopardo, Néstor Pastrana, and Héctor Campini, the twenty-story, 82,625 m^{2} (889,000 ft²) building would be the largest in Argentina up to that point. The building would thus be divided into three sections: two wings to be anchored by a central section staggered outwards in the 230 m (750 ft) long façade, and distinguishable also by a portico and its four additional floors. Construction on the structure began in 1938.

President Juan Perón renamed the landmark the Edificio Libertador in 1950 to honor the centennial of the death of General José de San Martín (known locally as the Liberator of Argentina, Chile and Peru). The tunnels connecting the building to the presidential offices helped save the populist leader's life during the September 16–19, 1955, Revolución Libertadora coup against him, when he took refuge in the War Ministry before being ultimately deposed and exiled. Perón returned to power in 1973, but his break with erstwhile supporters, the far-left Montoneros, led to a violent conflict between them and his successor, Isabel Perón (his widow). Among the most noteworthy attacks in this conflict was the detonation of a car bomb by the Montoneros in front of the Libertador Building on March 15, 1976, which killed a civilian staffer and wounded 29 officers, helping trigger a coup d'état on March 24.

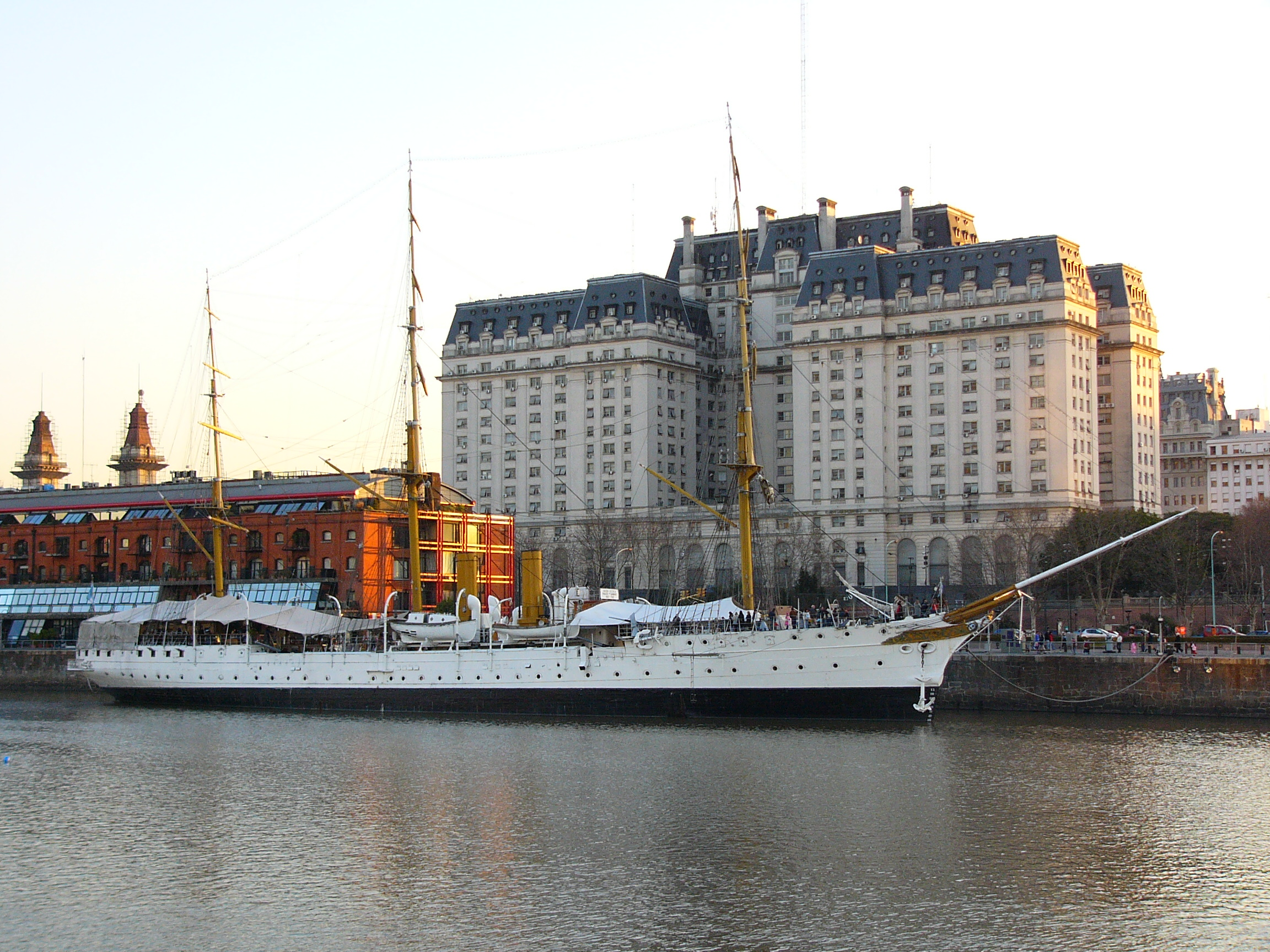
The building seen from Puerto Madero.

Its importance as the effective nerve center of Argentine government during the subsequent dictatorship was later dramatized by a scene filmed in the building by director Fernando Solanas for his acclaimed 1987 drama, Sur. The Libertador Building was again in the center of military friction in Argentina when, on December 3, 1990, during a state visit by U.S. President George H. W. Bush, far-right Carapintadas faction leader Col. Mohamed Alí Seineldín temporarily seized the headquarters in a failed coup attempt against President Carlos Menem (the revolt was quelled within hours).

Originally occupied only by the Army Headquarters, since the late 80s the building also houses the Ministry of Defense and the General Joint Staff, which had until then been located at a smaller building right across the street.

Defense Minister Nilda Garré ordered the departure of a Technical Cooperation Mission from the United States Armed Forces on April 20, 2009. The bureau, but for a brief interruption in 1973, had occupied offices in the building's 13th story since the 1960s.

== Architectural style and construction ==
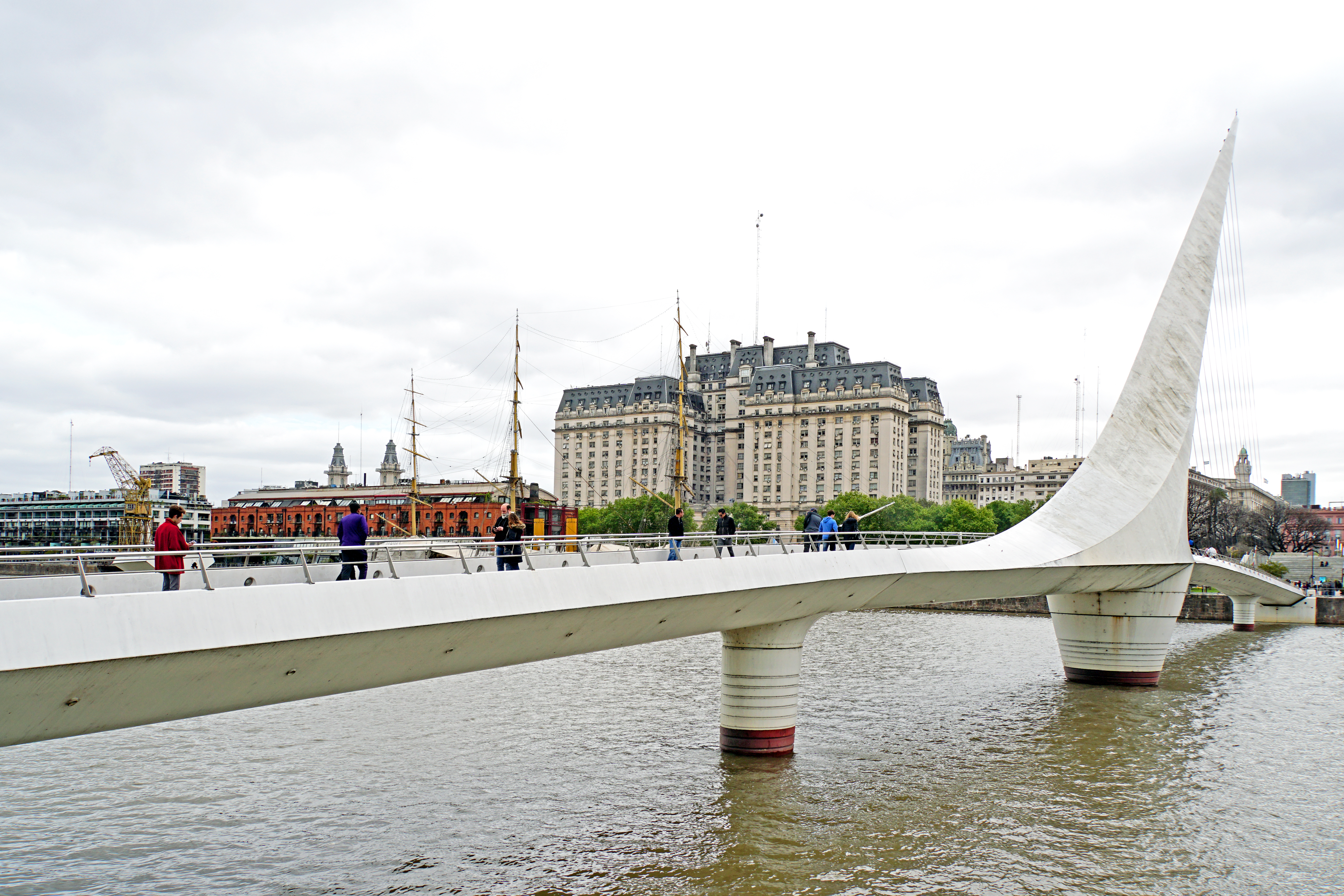
The building seen from the Puente de la Mujer.

The Libertador Building represents the transition between Beaux-Arts, prevalent in Argentina from 1880 until 1930, and the International Style, a movement beginning to extend outside of Europe and the United States. Designed in the French Renaissance style with its imported slate Mansard roof, which covers the top three floors. Its facades, in the form of a dimensional stone, are covered in a faux stone veneer, made of white cement, marble, and limestone sand. The exterior architecture of the building is of the classic style, uniting the simplicity of its lines and grandiosity in its overall composition, while the style of its interiors correspond more to Stripped Classicism. An example of the latter is the Hall of San Martín with its tall ceilings, symmetric design, and Classical composition, which features floors and walls covered in marble.

The building was equipped with Siemens elevators and communications networks, whose installation was overseen by German engineers. Following the installation of security systems, libraries, archives and a tunnel connecting the building to the Casa Rosada, as well as the lengthy and politically sensitive process of assigning wings and pavilions to the myriad Argentine military bureaus, the new War Ministry was inaugurated in April 1943.
