= Avenida Presidente Julio Argentino Roca =

Avenue in Buenos Aires, Argentina

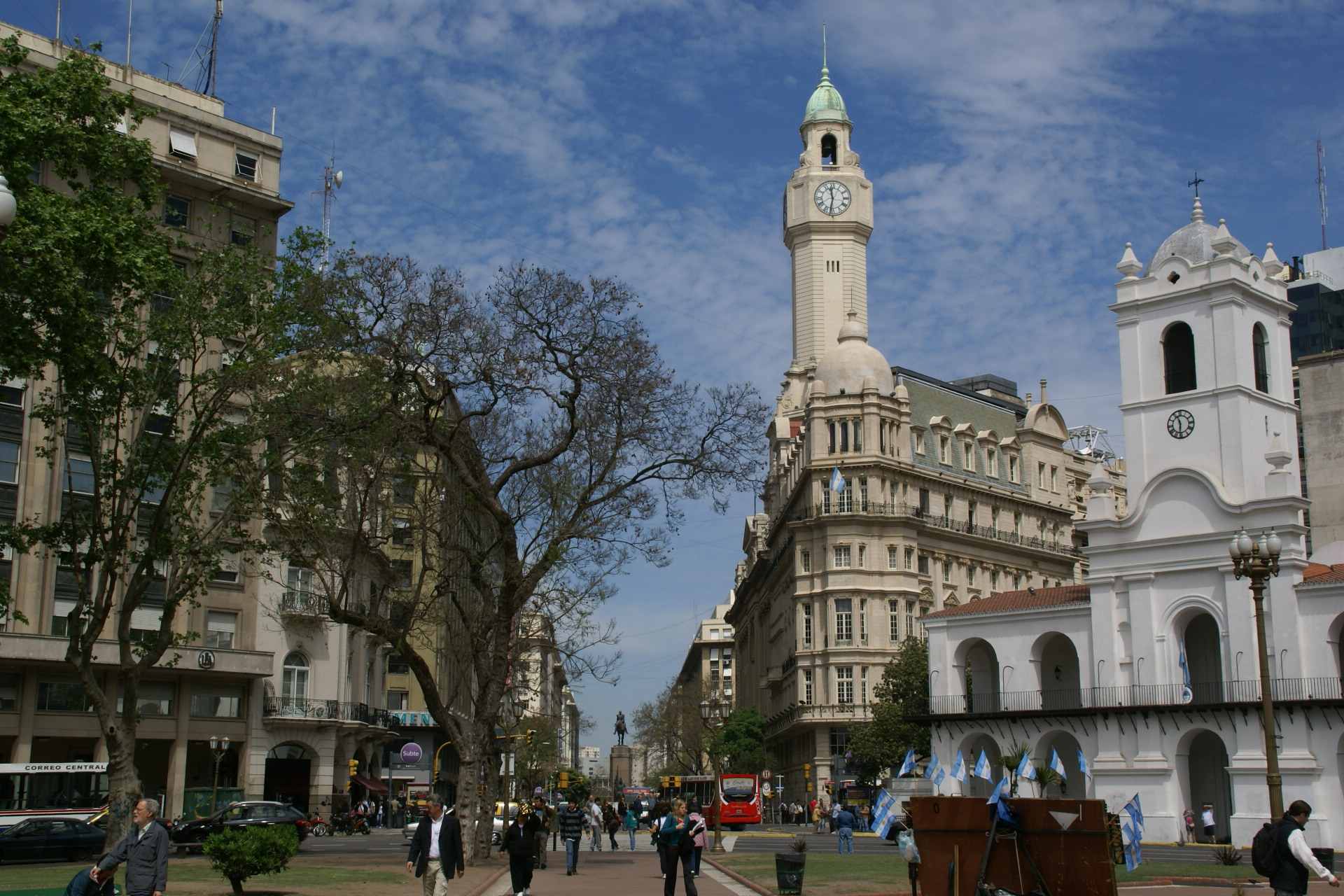
View of Diagonal Sur from Plaza de Mayo.

Avenida Presidente Julio Argentino Roca, better known as Diagonal Sur (Spanish for "South Diagonal", the counterpart to Diagonal Norte), is an important avenue in the Monserrat neighborhood of Buenos Aires, Argentina. It is oriented north-east/south-west, diagonally bisecting the city blocks (manzanas) which give the city centre a checkerboard plan. It is named after President Julio Argentino Roca, who held power from 1880 to 1886, and from 1896 to 1904.

== Connections ==
The north-west corner of Plaza de Mayo is the start of Avenida Presidente Julio Argentino Roca (i.e. the corner of Hipolito Yrigoyen and Bolivar street), just to the north of the Palace of the City Legislature. At the junction with Peru street is located equestrian monument to Julio Argentino Roca.

== Underground ==
Below the entire length of the avenue runs line of the Buenos Aires Underground, which has two stations along the Diagonal (stations Bolívar and Belgrano).

== Gallery ==
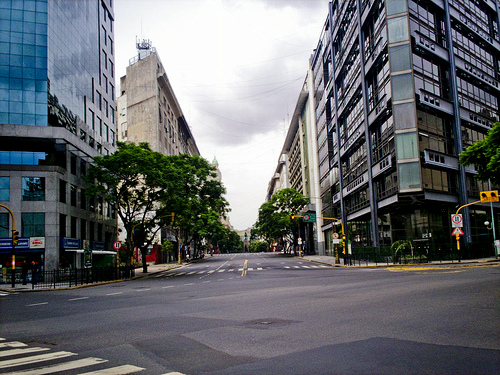
View of Julio A. Roca Avenue from Belgrano Avenue

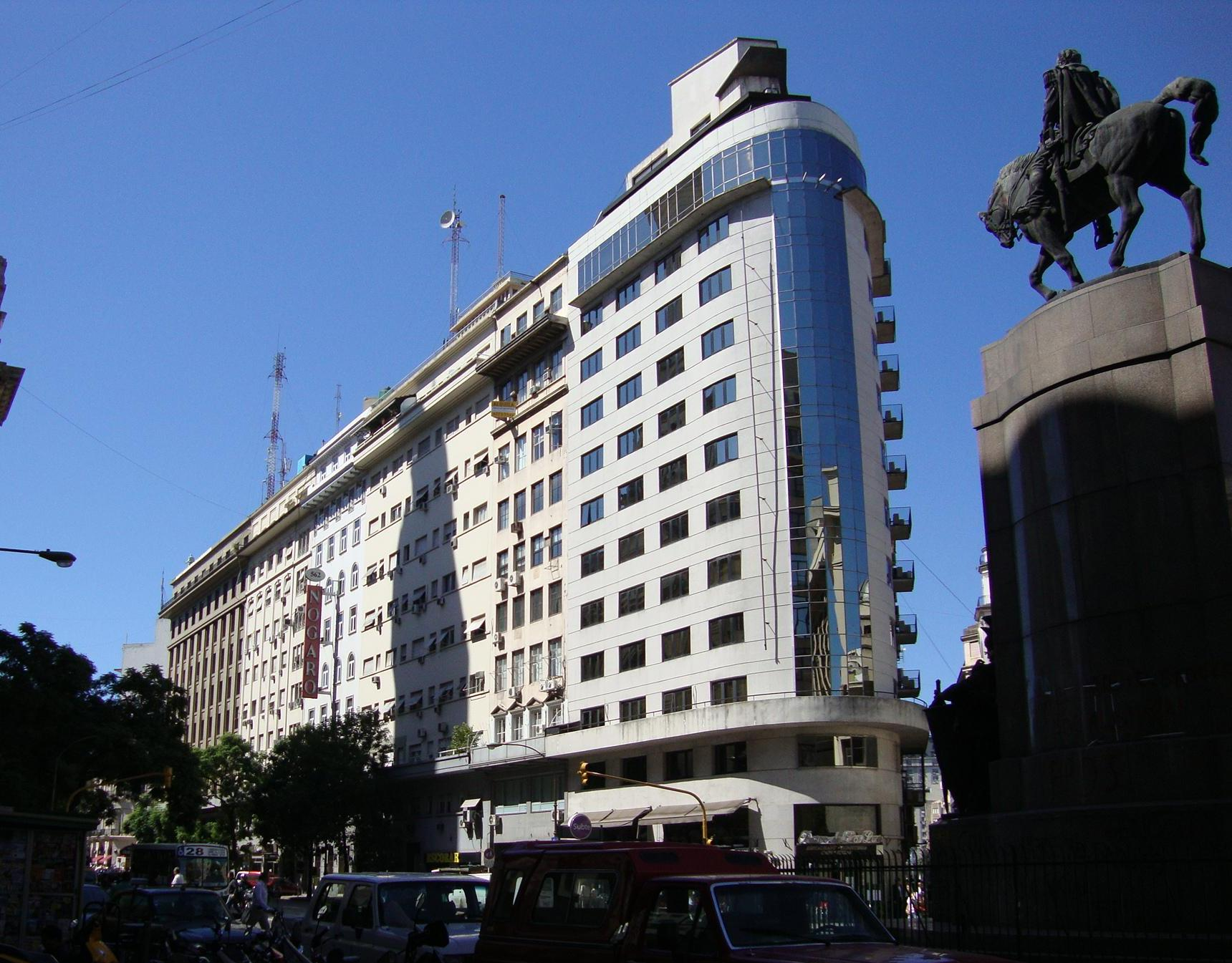
Office building on Julio A. Roca Avenue

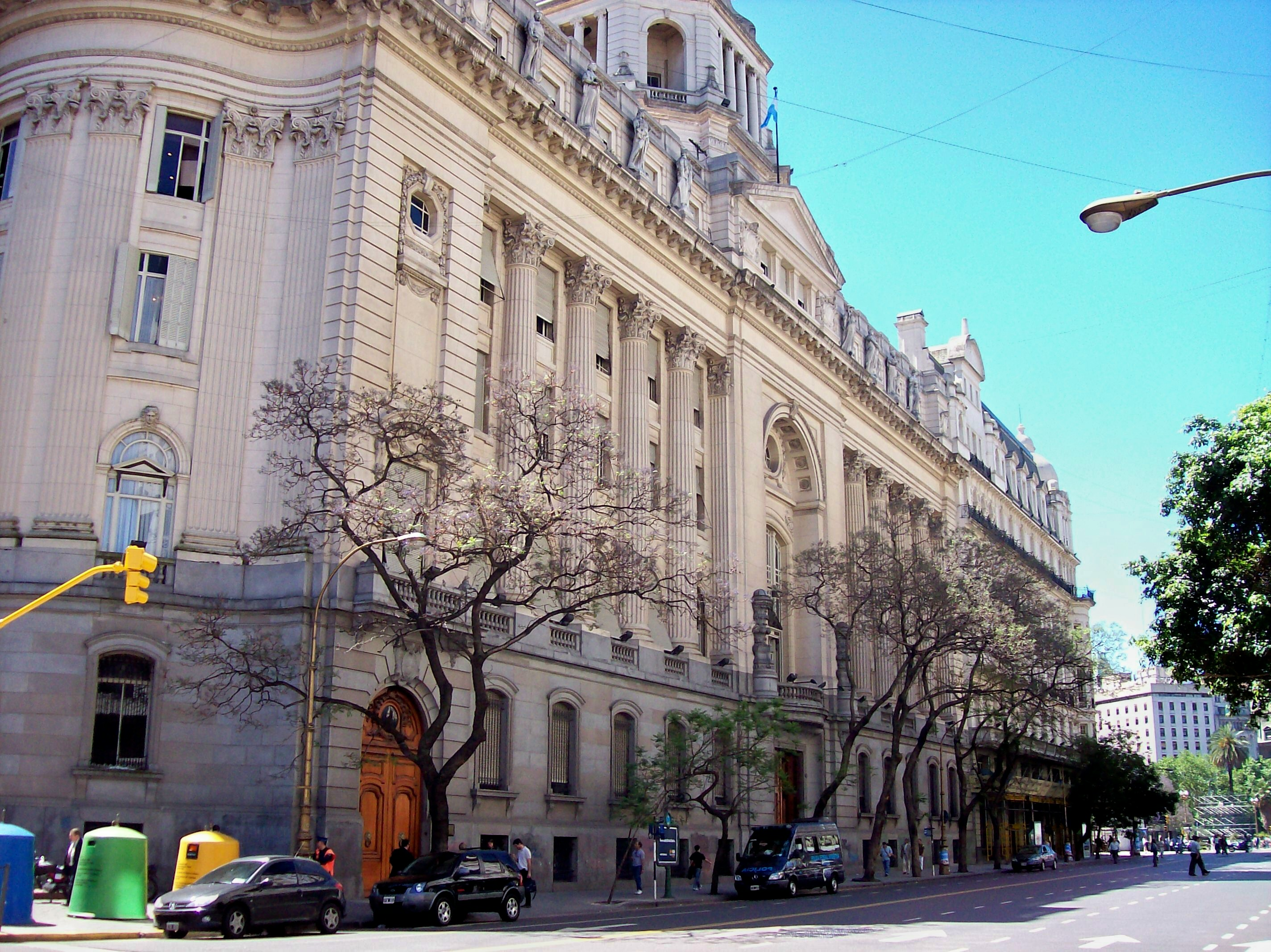
Buenos Aires City Legislature Palace

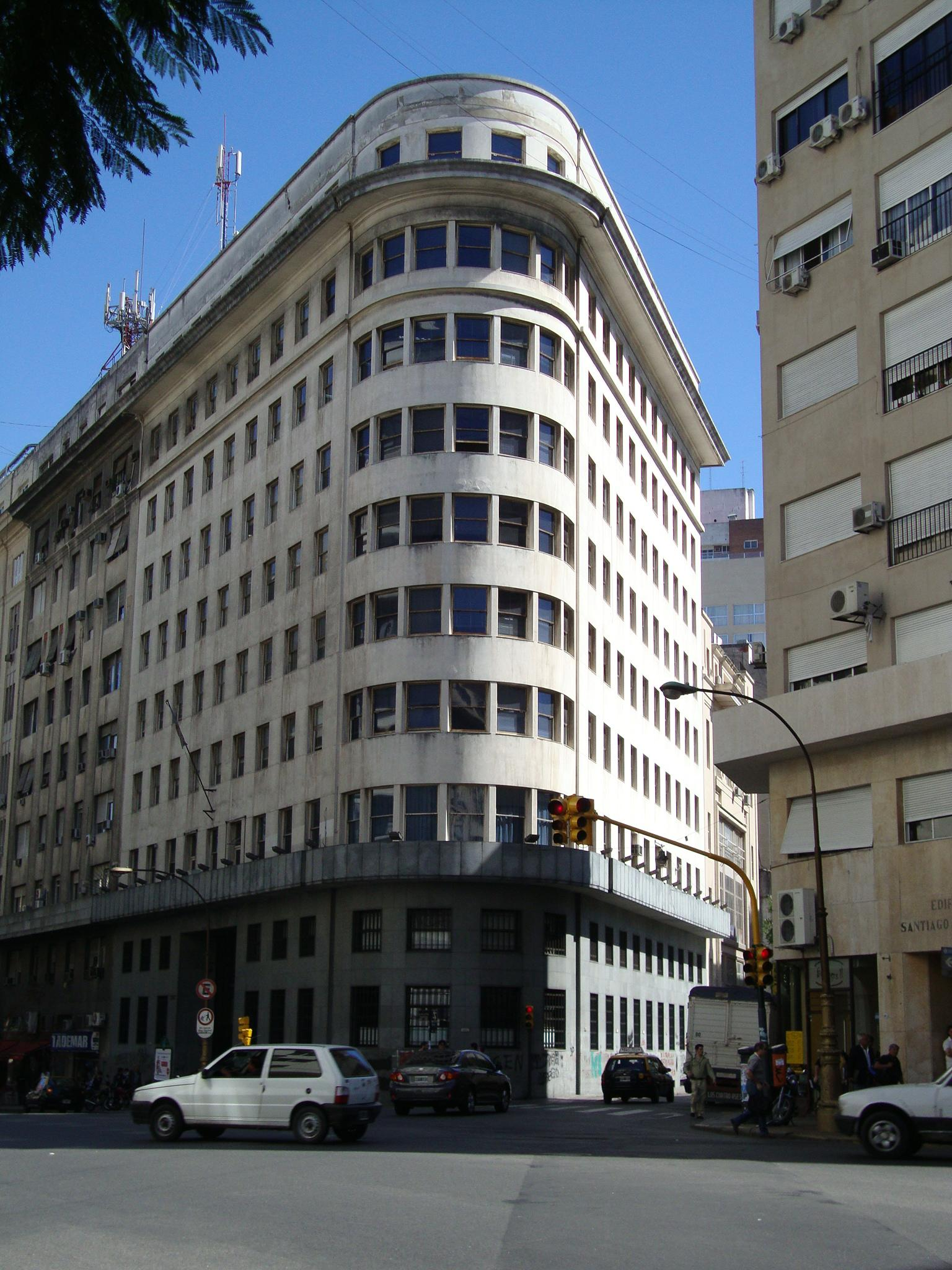
Superintendency of Insurance

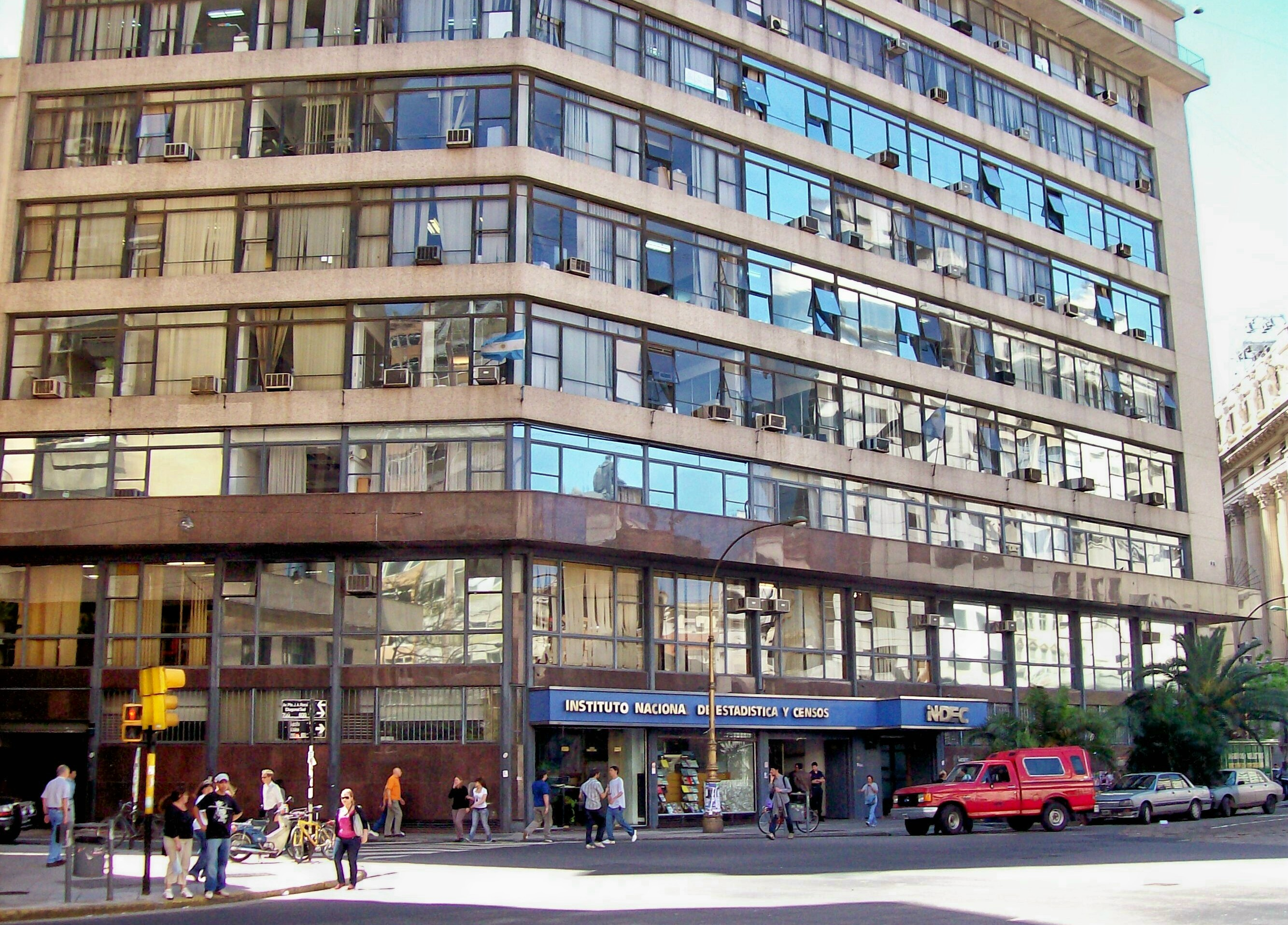
Headquarters of the INDEC

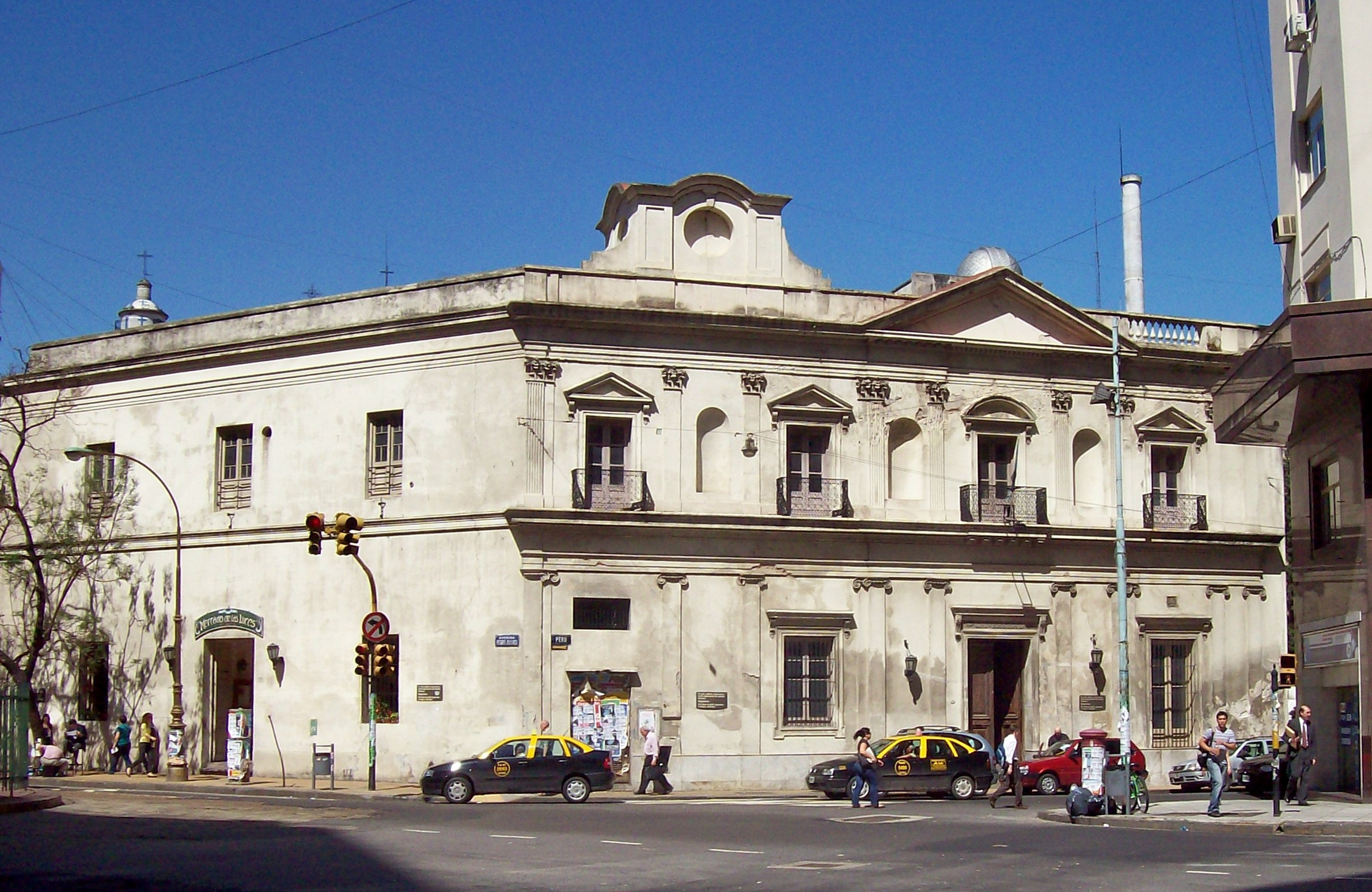
Illuminated Block

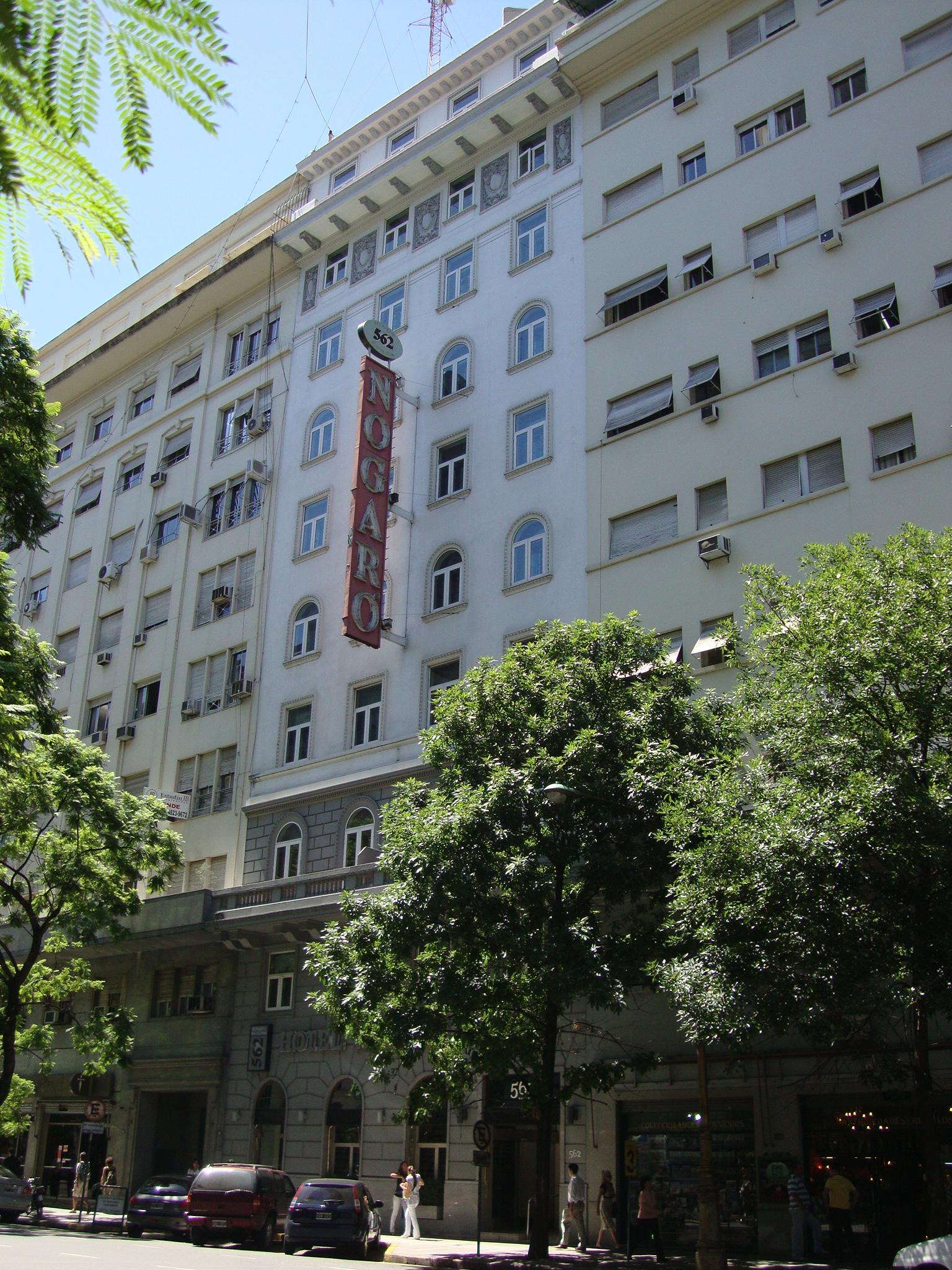
Hotel Nogaró

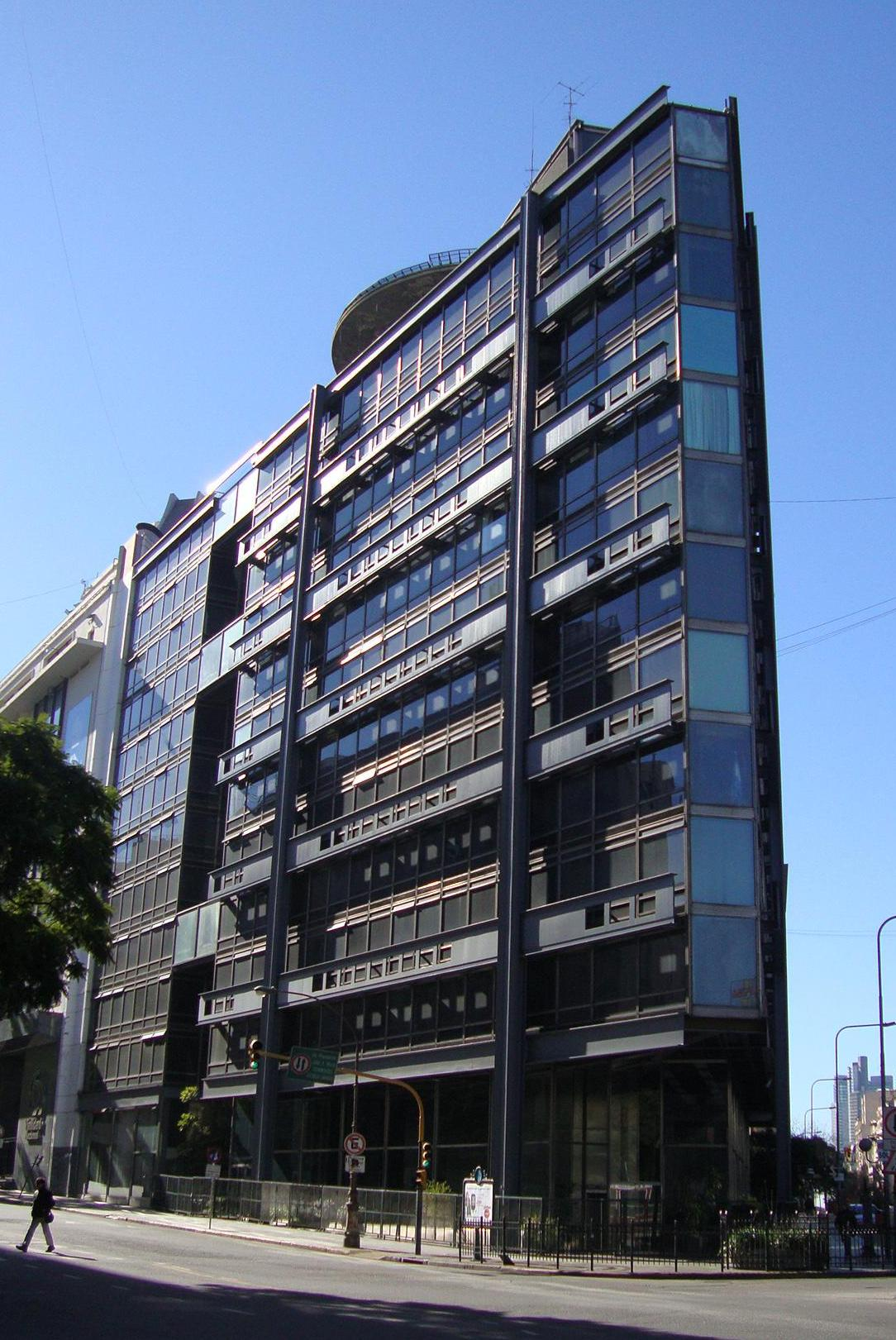
Somisa Building, seat of the Cabinet Chief's Office
