= Casa de Liniers =

National historical site of Buenos Aires, Argentina

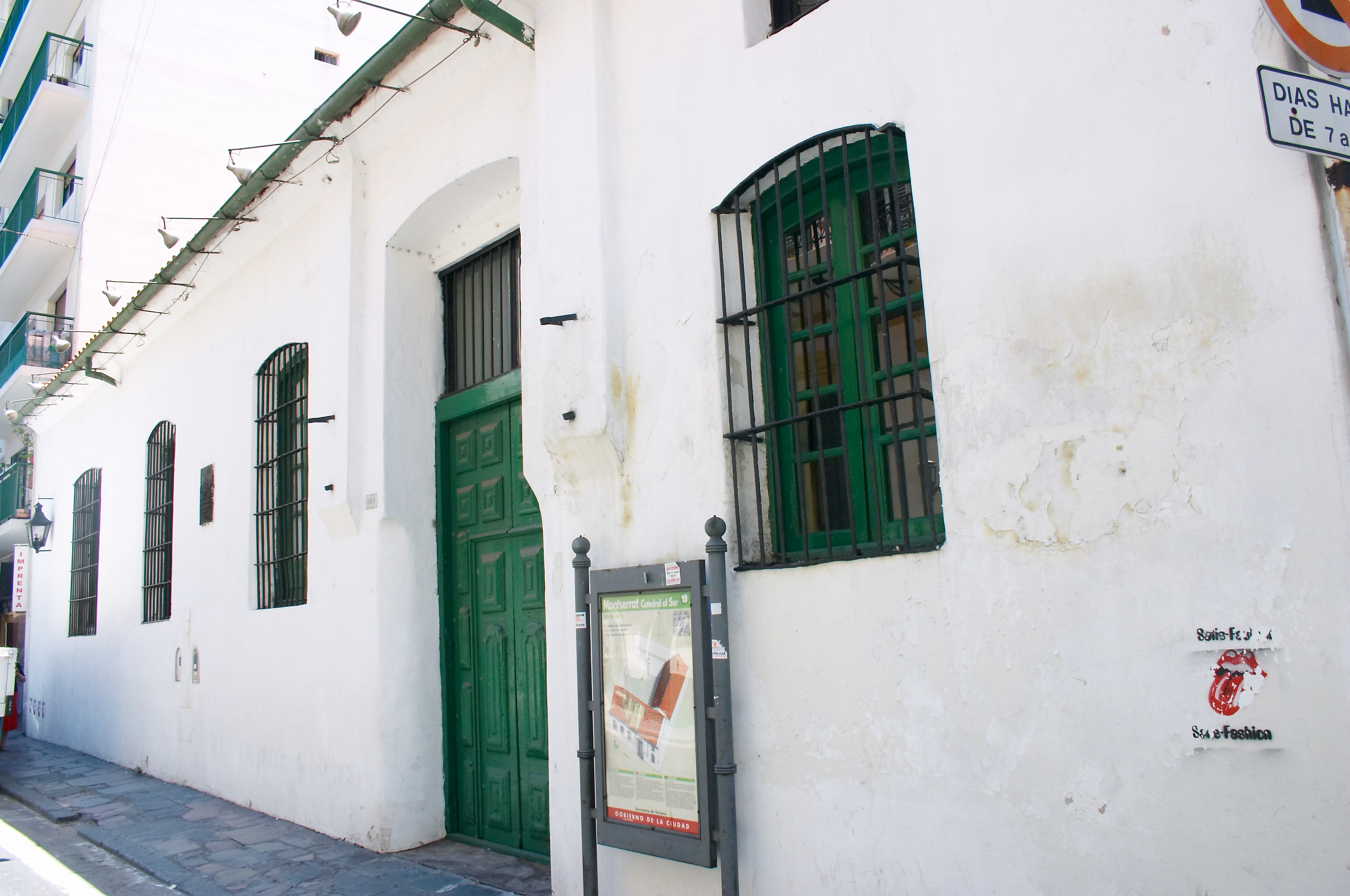
- Espacio Liniers
- Interactive map of the Casa de Liniers area

General information
- Architectural style: Colonial
- Location: Venezuela 469, Monserrat, Buenos Aires, Argentina
- Completed: 1788

National Historic Monument of Argentina
- Designated: 1942

Casa de Liniers is a national historical site of Buenos Aires, Argentina, built towards the end of 1780s. It was the official residence of Santiago de Liniers, 1st Count of Buenos Aires.

== History ==
The construction of this colonial house is from the late 18th century, and originally belonged to Martín Simón de Sarratea, father-in-law of Liniers. It is located on Calle Venezuela 469, at the intersections of Defensa and Bolivar streets, Monserrat neighborhood, Buenos Aires.

Santiago de Liniers, viceroy of the River Plate lived in this house between 1806 and 1809. Inside his residence, General Willian Beresford signed the terms of his capitulation before the Spanish authorities, event occurred on August 20, 1806, during the first English invasion of the Río de la Plata.

La Casa Liniers was also inhabited by Ángel de Estrada, a cousin of the Liniers Sarratea family. It was declared a National Historic Monument in 1942.
