= Monserrat, Buenos Aires =

Coordinates: 34°36′45″S 58°23′00″W

Monserrat
- Barrio
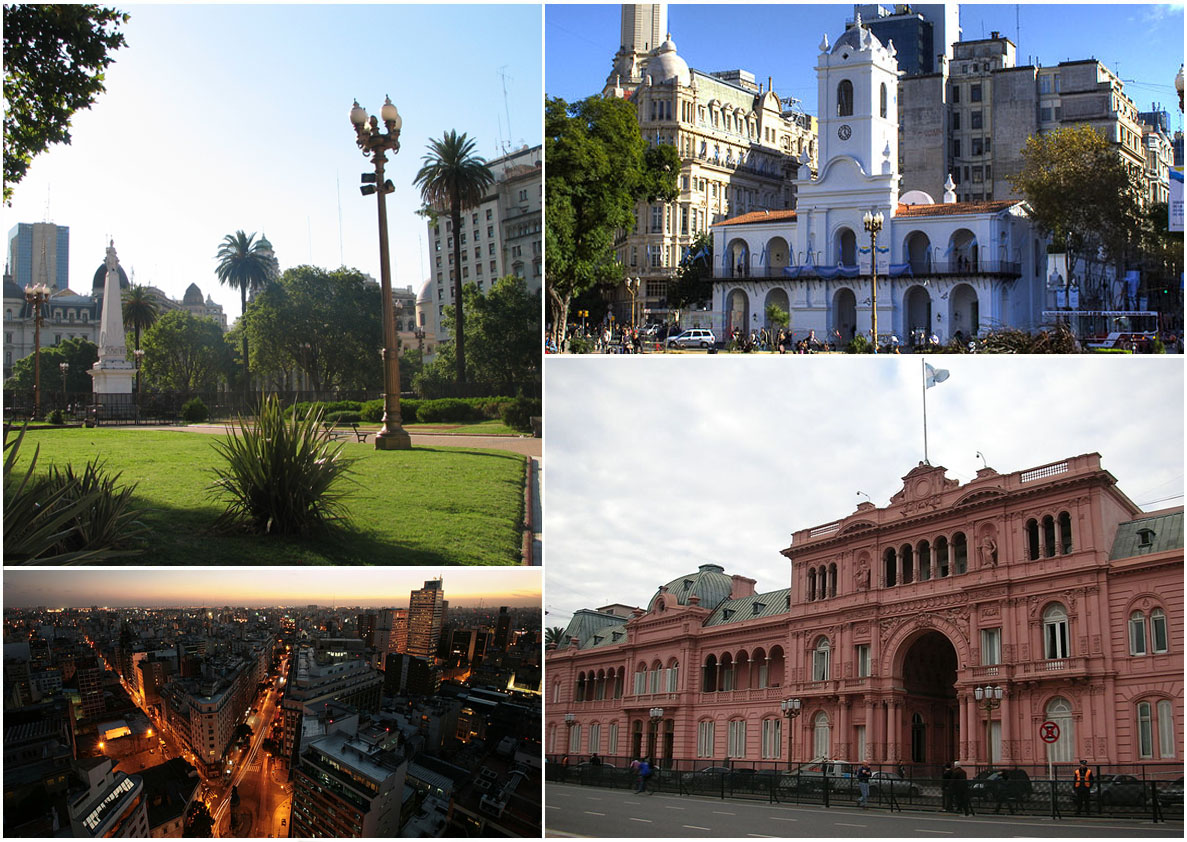
- Clockwise from top: the Plaza de Mayo, the Cabildo, South Diagonal and Casa Rosada.

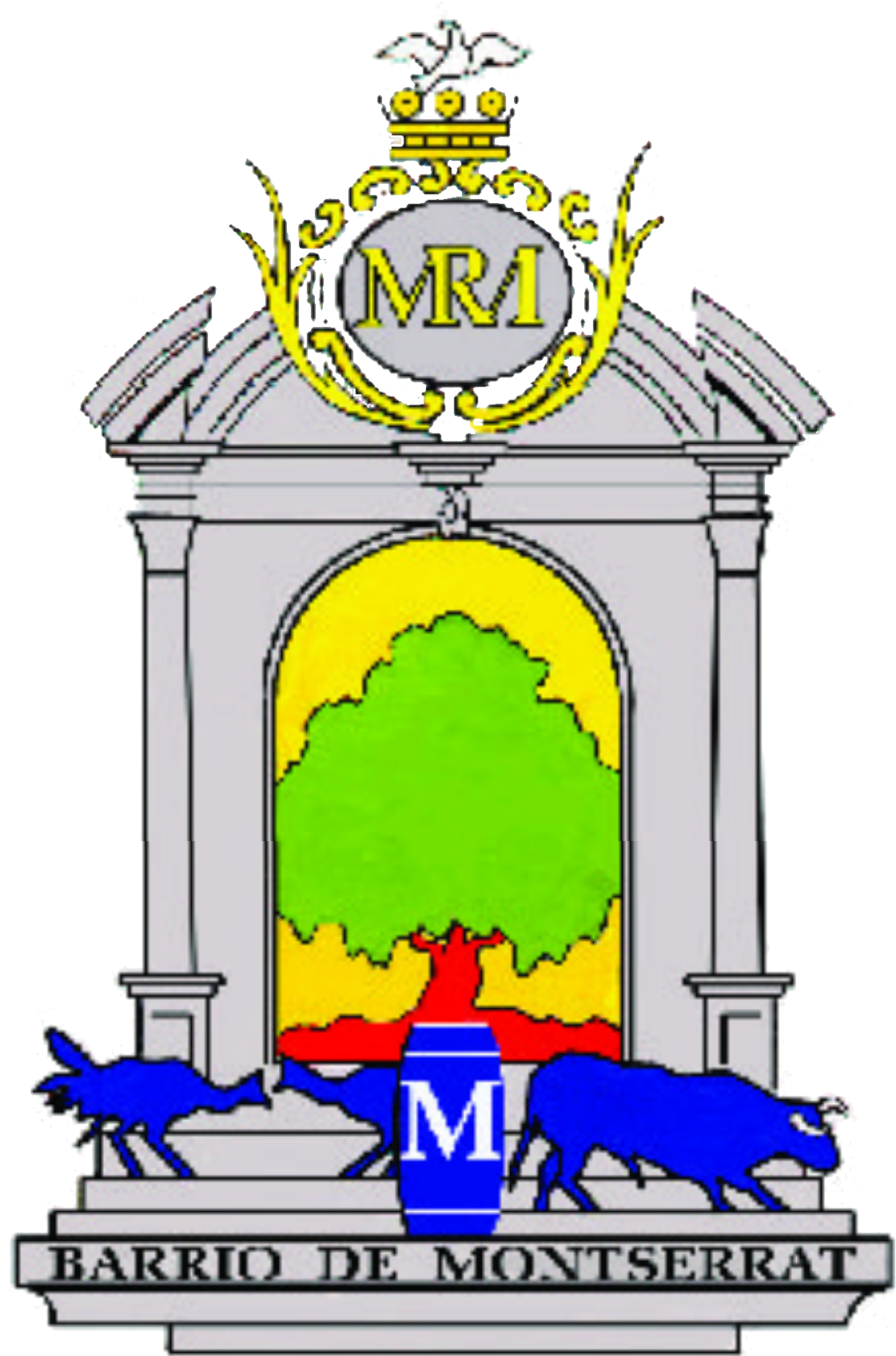
- Emblem
- Location of Montserrat in Buenos Aires
- Country: Argentina
- Autonomous City: Buenos Aires
- Comuna: C1
- Important sites: City Hall; City Legislature; Buenos Aires Cabildo; Café Tortoni; Casa Rosada; Colegio Nacional de Buenos Aires; Jesuit Temple of St. Ignatius and college Plaza de Mayo; Equestrian monument to General Manuel Belgrano

Area
  - Total: 2.2 km^{2} (0.85 sq mi)

Population
  - Total: 43,560
  - Density: 20,000/km^{2} (51,000/sq mi)
- Time zone: UTC-3 (ART)

Monserrat or Montserrat (Note: Montserrat (Note: Pronounced [munsəˈrat] in standard eastern Catalan) is the original Catalan name, but both spellings are used today.) (pronounced [monseˈrat]) is a neighbourhood in the east of the Buenos Aires CBD. The district features some of the most important public buildings in Buenos Aires, including city hall, the city legislature, Casa Rosada, the Colegio Nacional de Buenos Aires and the Libertador Building (Ministry of Defense), among others.

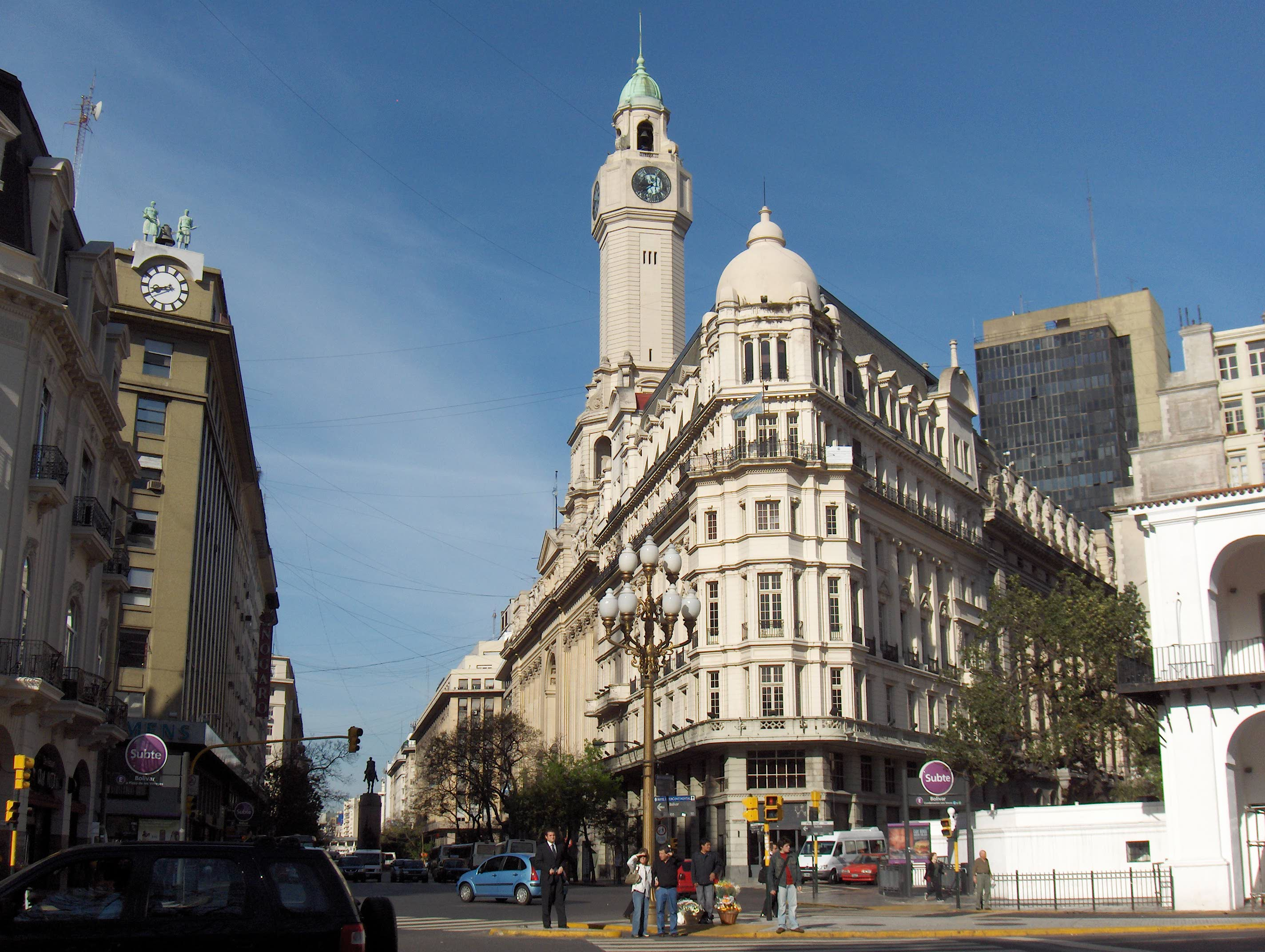
Buenos Aires City Legislature. The Monserrat area houses much of the city's (and Argentina's) governmental structure.

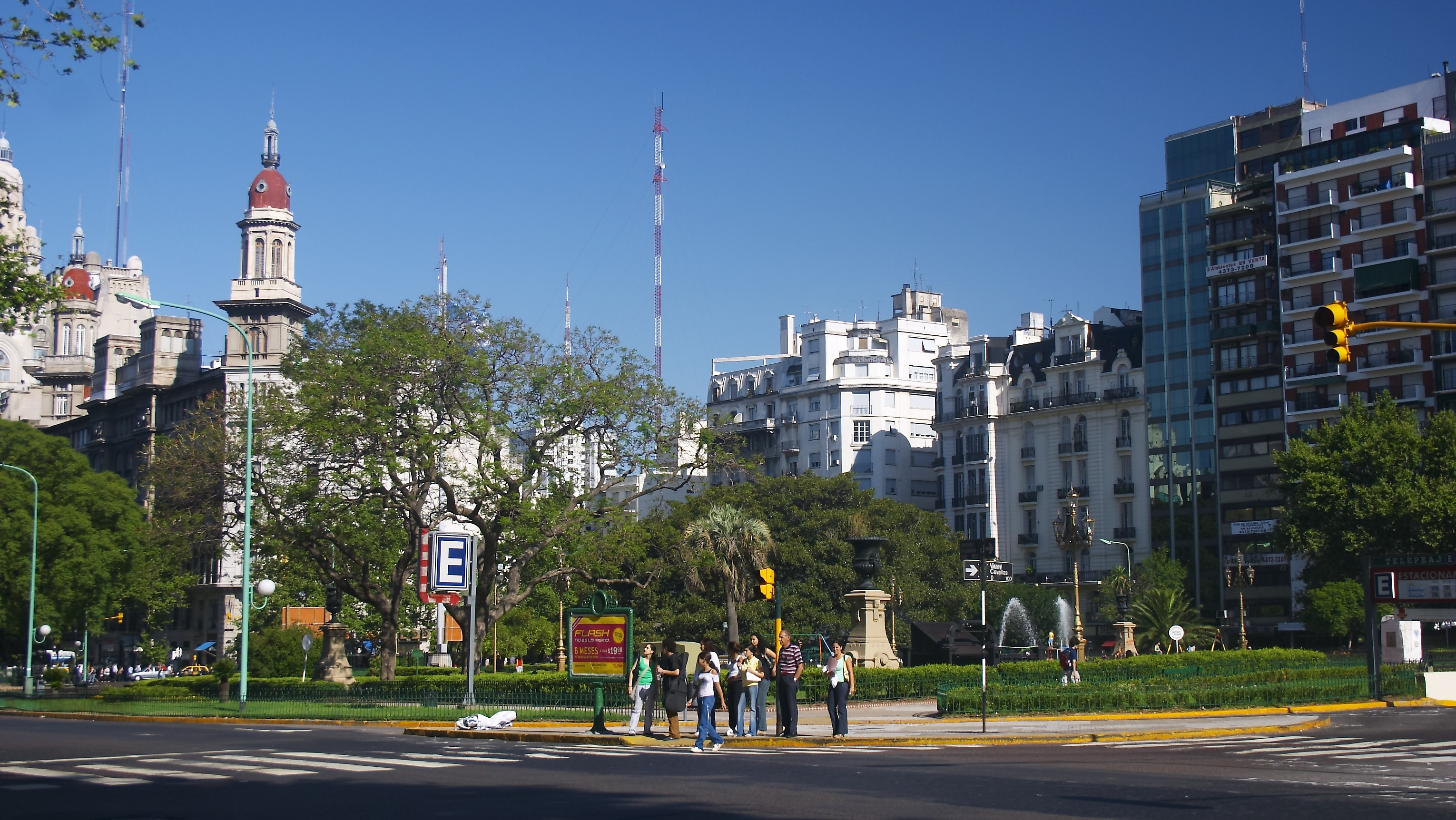
Mariano Moreno Plaza, near Congress

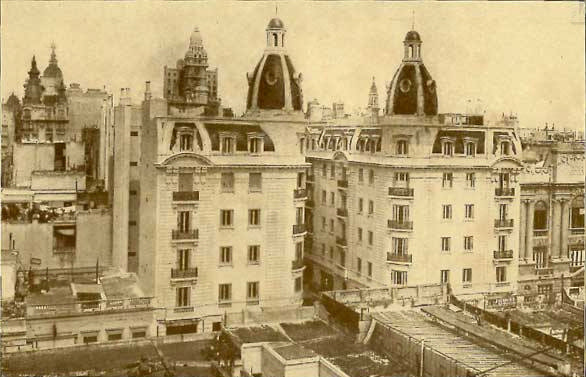
Pasaje La Rural (Rodolfo Rivarola)

Avenida de Mayo runs through the Monserrat district, connecting Plaza de Mayo and the Plaza de los Dos Congresos (Congressional Plaza).

A block, or two, south of the Plaza de Mayo, the older section of Monserrat begins. This is Buenos Aires' oldest neighborhood and even today, very little of the cityscape there is less than a hundred years old (except along Belgrano Avenue), thereby making a nearly seamless transition to the likewise historic San Telmo district, to the south.

== History ==
The Monserrat area traces its origins to the foundation of Buenos Aires itself, when, in 1580, Spanish Adelantado Juan de Garay disembarked on the area's shores. The Fort of Juan Baltazar of Austria, the marginal settlement's first, was built in 1594 and, in 1608, newly arrived Jesuits were granted a 2-hectare (5 acre) lot, nearby. The Jesuits began work on the Saint Ignatius Church in 1686. Consecrated in 1734, it is the oldest existing church in Buenos Aires. Possessing the finest school and library at the time and offering colonial Buenos Aires' only truly classical education there, their property became popularly known as the "Illuminated Block." The small city's growing population led to the introduction of a number of other religious orders in this area, notably the Catalan Brotherhood of the Virgin of Montserrat, whose chapel became the neighborhood namesake in 1769. The Cabildo (City hall) became the scene of the 1810 pronouncements in favor of autonomy that later led to independence and, to commemorate the fact, in 1811 the iconic May Pyramid was placed in what later became the Plaza de Mayo.

Little changed over the next seventy years, Monserrat's muddy shore and typically colonial grid of cobblestone streets came under a rapid modernization following Argentina's sudden economic development after 1875. Land reclamation and the creation of docks parallel to the area led to the construction of Paseo Colón (still a major thoroughfare) along Monserrat's eastern edge. The area's two adjoining squares became the Plaza de Mayo in 1884, a milestone joined by the completion of the presidential executive building, the Casa Rosada. This was followed by the massive razing of colonial architecture (including part of the Cabildo) to make way for the Avenida de Mayo, opened in 1894 and Congressional Plaza, in 1910. The avenue became home to the Buenos Aires Metro's first stations, in 1913.

The area's led central location and its presence therein of much of Argentina's governmental structure led to monumental construction over the next twenty years, notable among which are the Buenos Aires City Legislature, the Customs building, the offices of La Prensa (today the Buenos Aires House of Culture), the art-deco NH City Hotel (off the Plaza de Mayo), the Ministry of Defense and South Diagonal Avenue. Monserrat's western half was partitioned from the rest by the southward expansion of the massive Nueve de Julio Avenue around 1950 and, partial to trendy high-rises, much of Monserrat's middle class and commercial office space market left, afterwards. The area became a largely bohemian quarter popular with tango performers and artists, as well as many who preferred the area's close proximity to the growing financial district to the north and its relatively low rent scale. Its rich architectural history and quaint, narrow streets have, as in neighboring San Telmo, helped lead to renewed interest in Monserrat since around 1990, a change highlighted by the 1993 opening of the high-rise InterContinental Hotel. The area's numerous Spanish restaurants and social clubs belonging to Buenos Aires' large Spaniard community have long associated Monserrat with local Spanish tradition, helping make it attractive to tourism for cultural reasons, as well as those of ambiance.

Among its historic buildings is the house where Viceroy Santiago Liniers lived. This historical site is known by the name of Casa de Liniers, and is located on the street Venezuela 469. Another of the historical sites is the Iglesia Presbiteriana San Andrés, a Presbyterian church located on Belgrano Avenue.

== Gallery ==
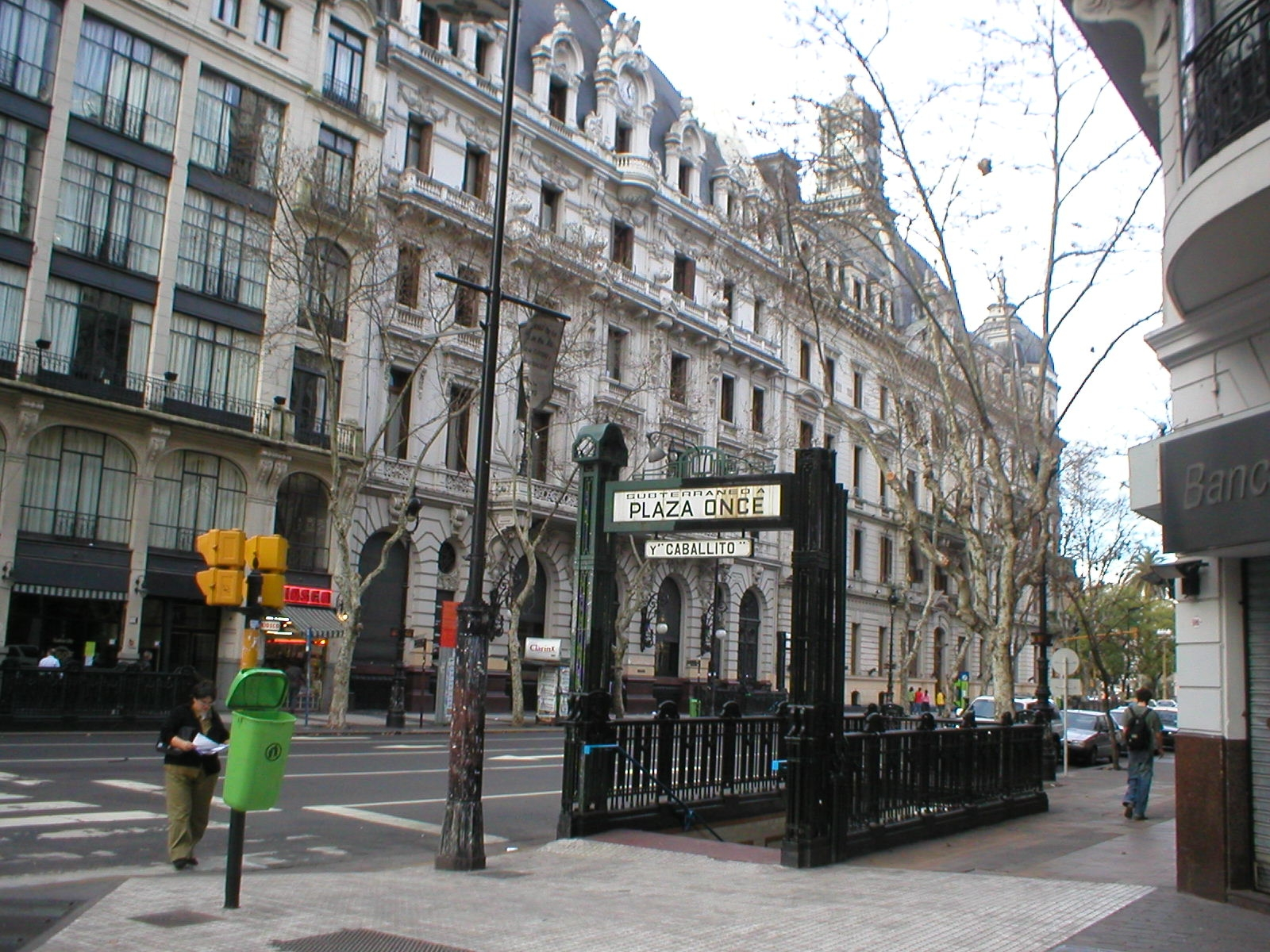
Vintage entrance to subte Line A of the Buenos Aires Metro on Avenida de Mayo; behind it, City Hall

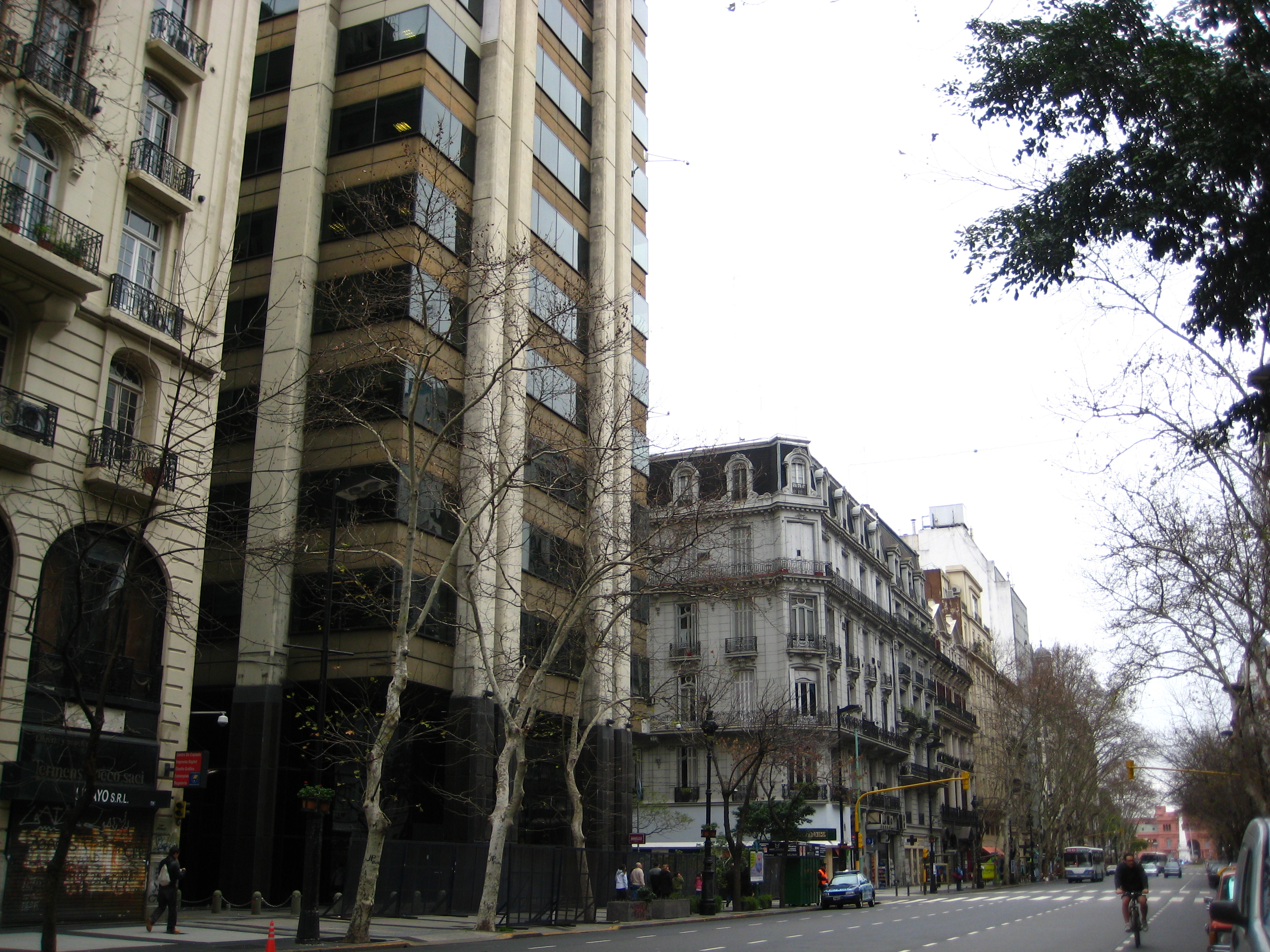
Architectural contrasts on the Avenida de Mayo

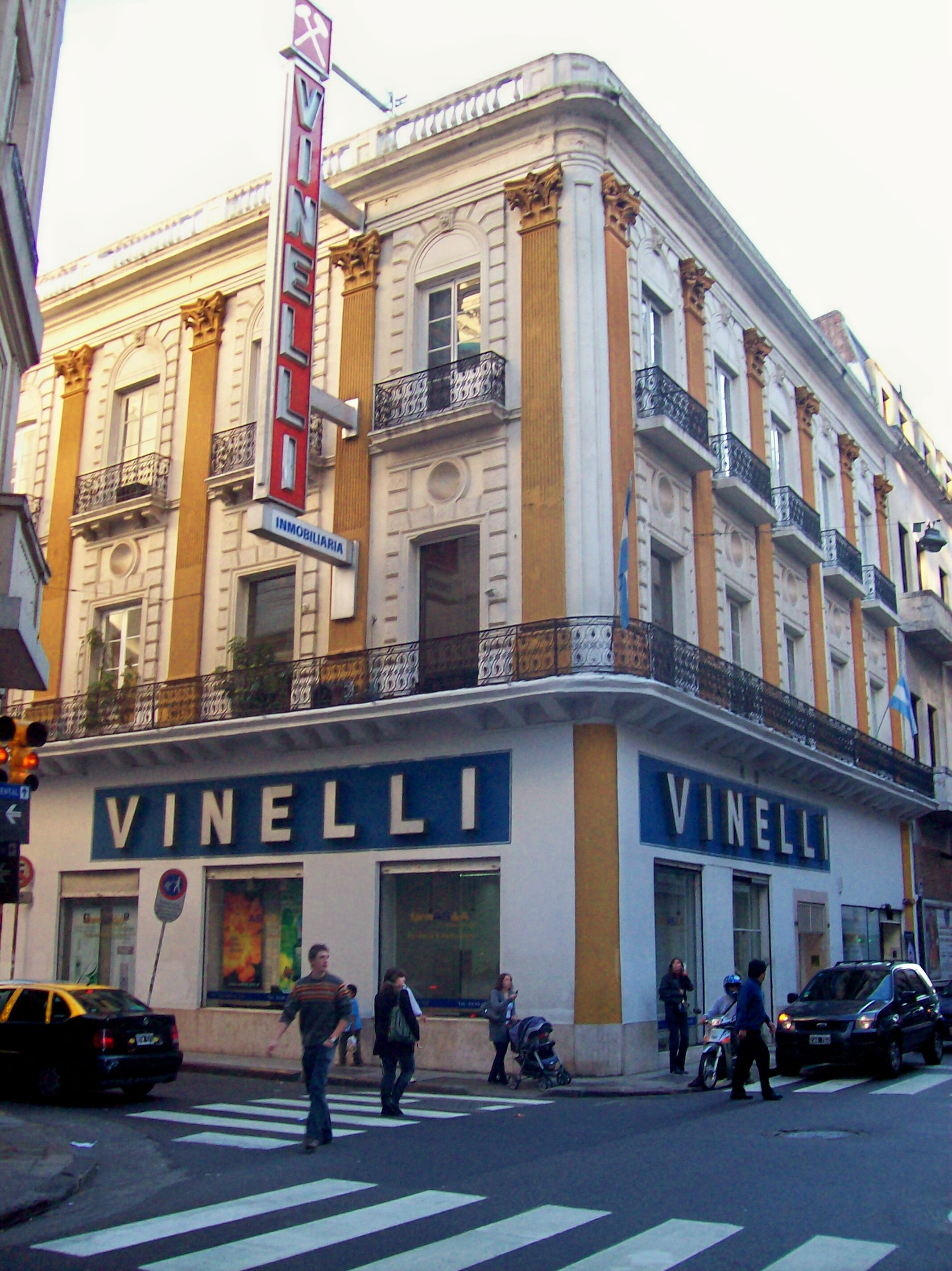
Typical vintage corner in Monserrat

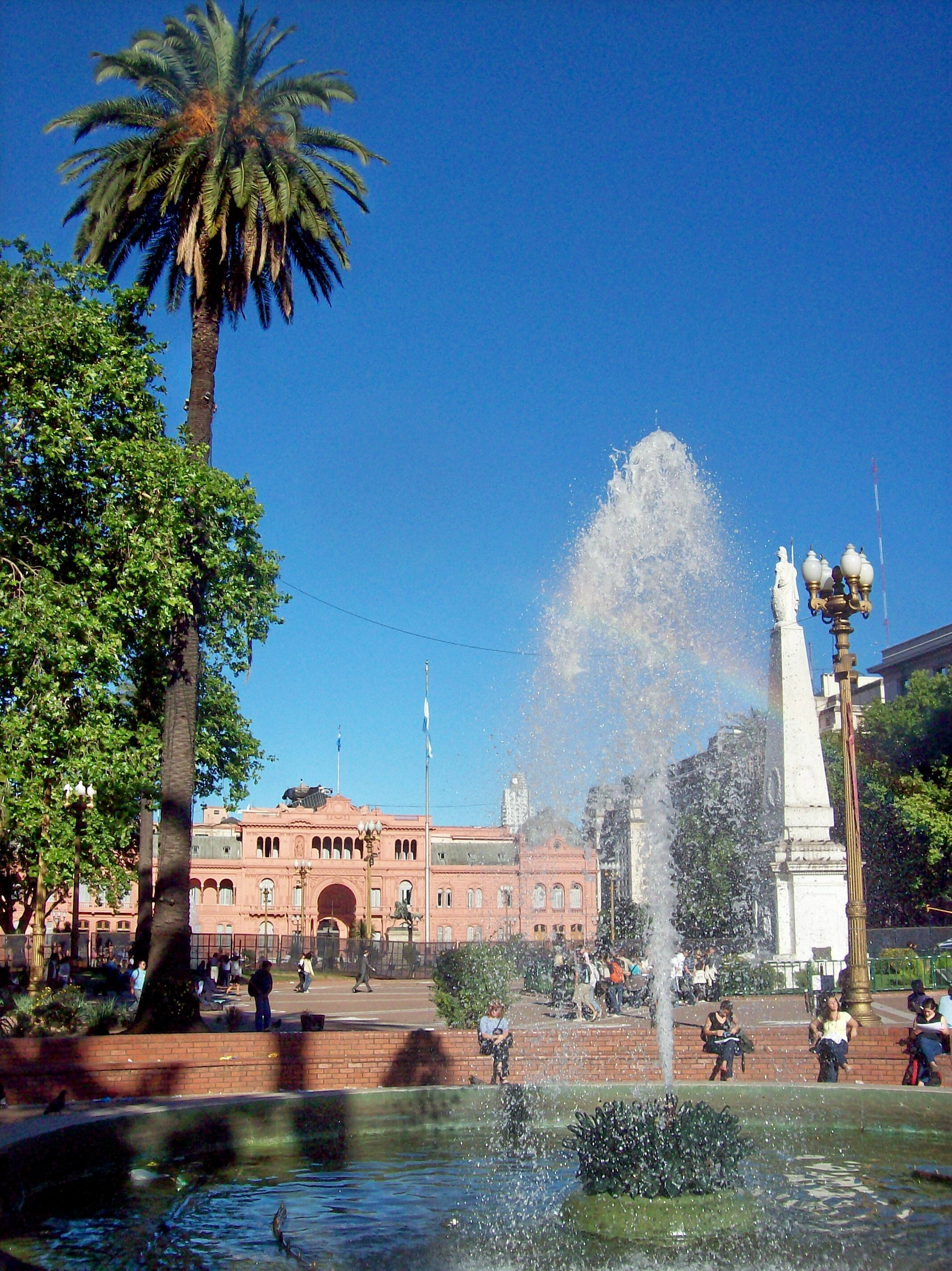
Eastward view of the Plaza de Mayo and Casa Rosada

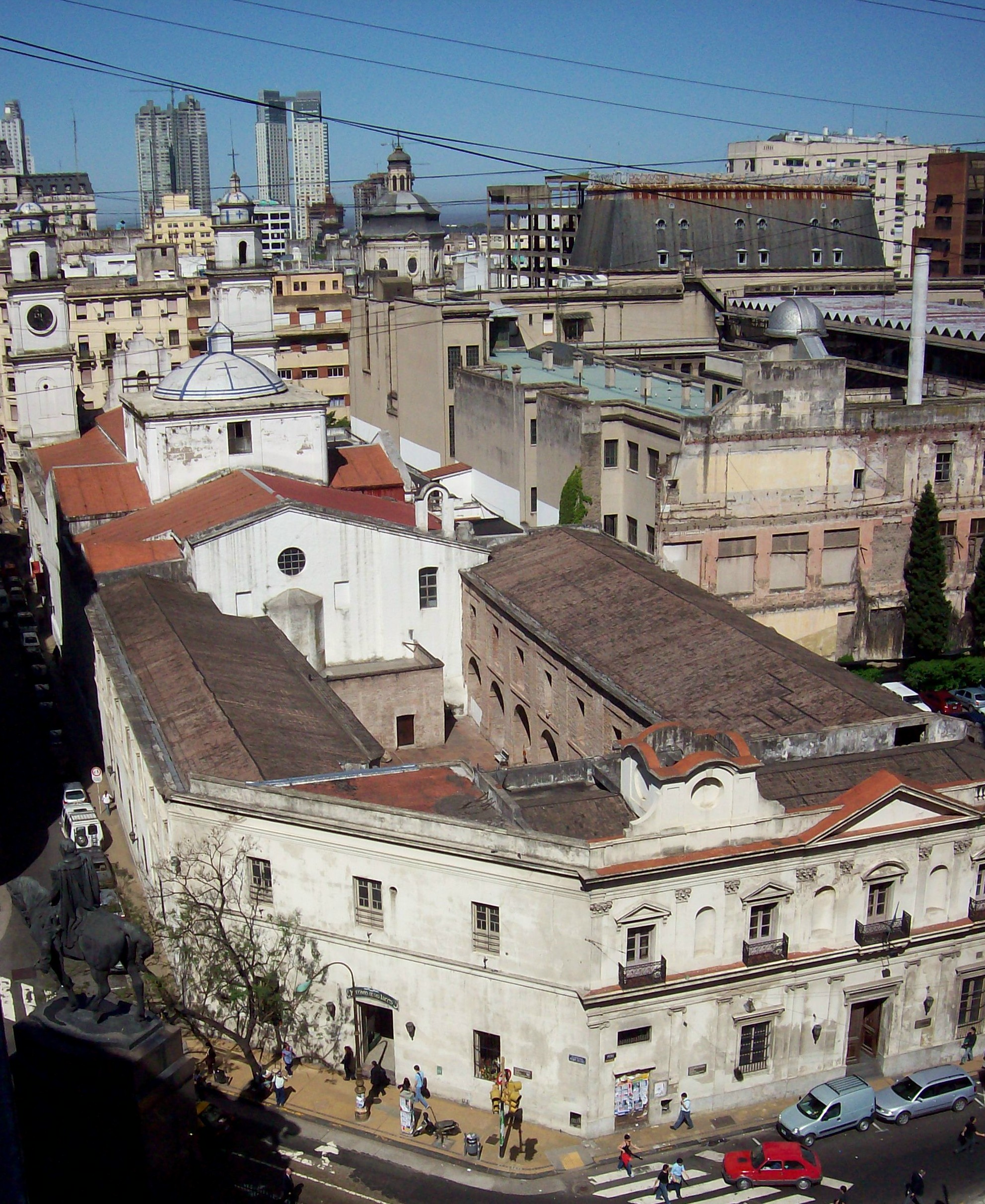
The Jesuit Temple of St. Ignatius and the colonial Illuminated Block

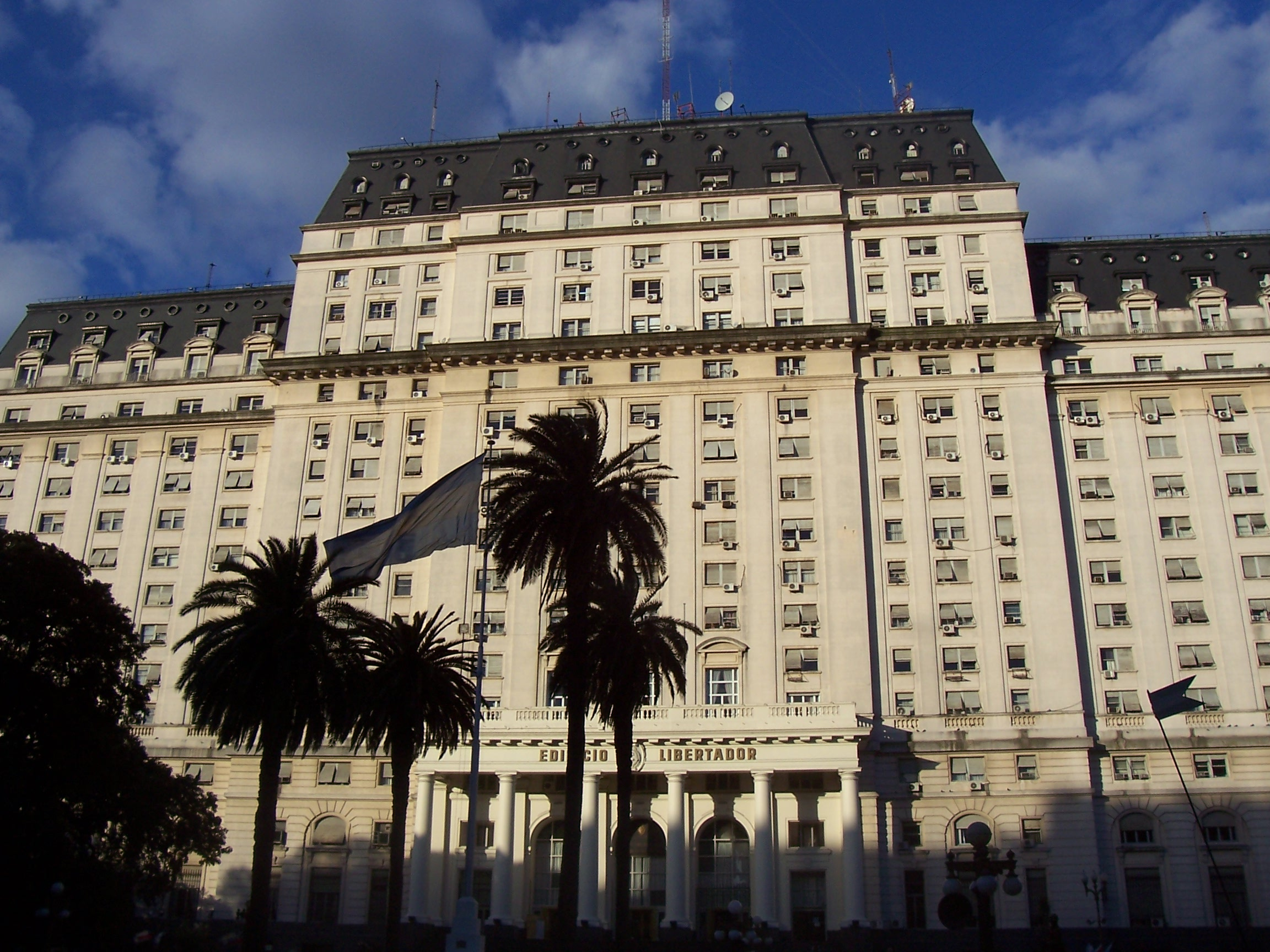
The Ministry of Defense, the Libertador Building

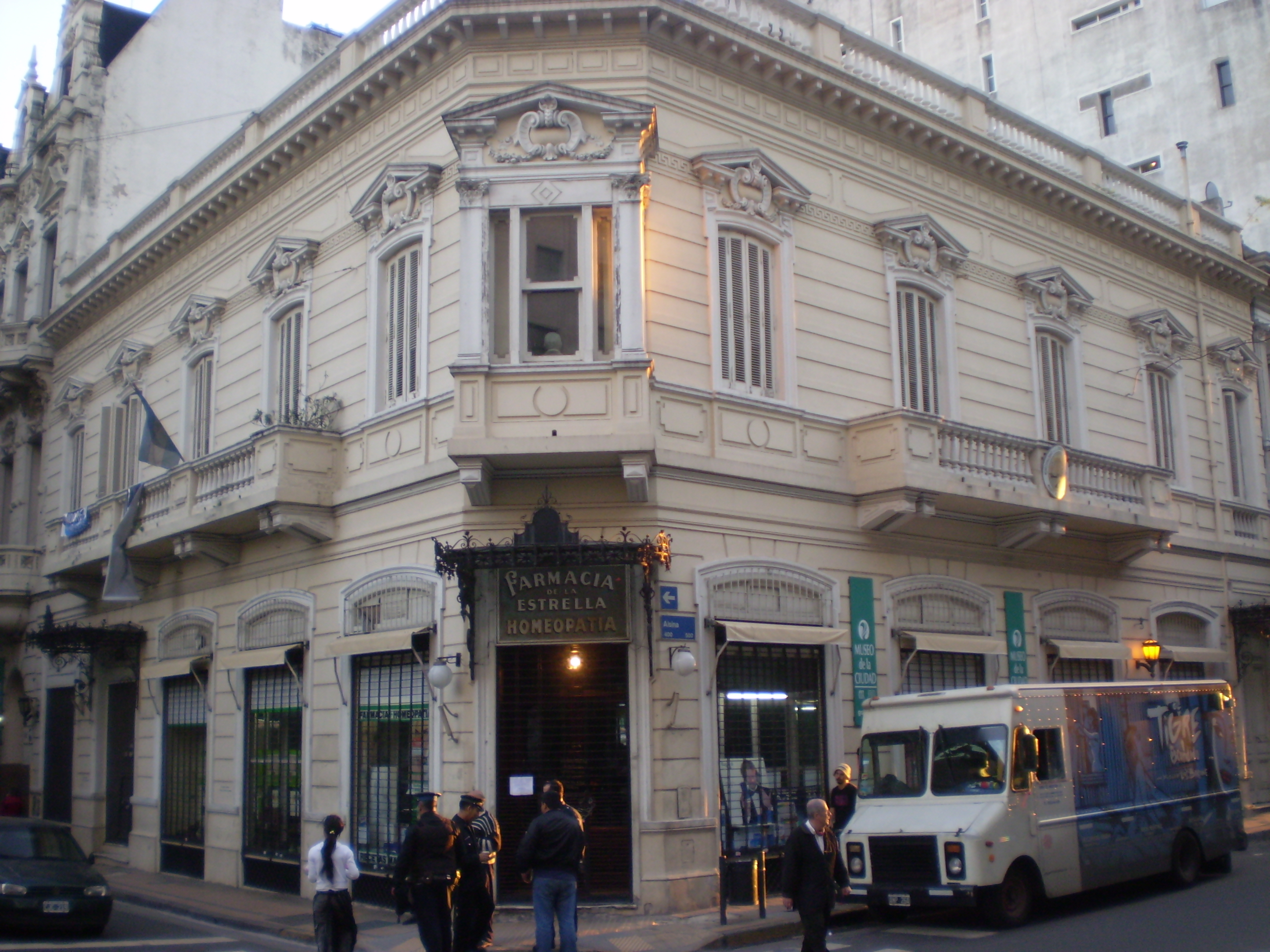
City Historical Museum

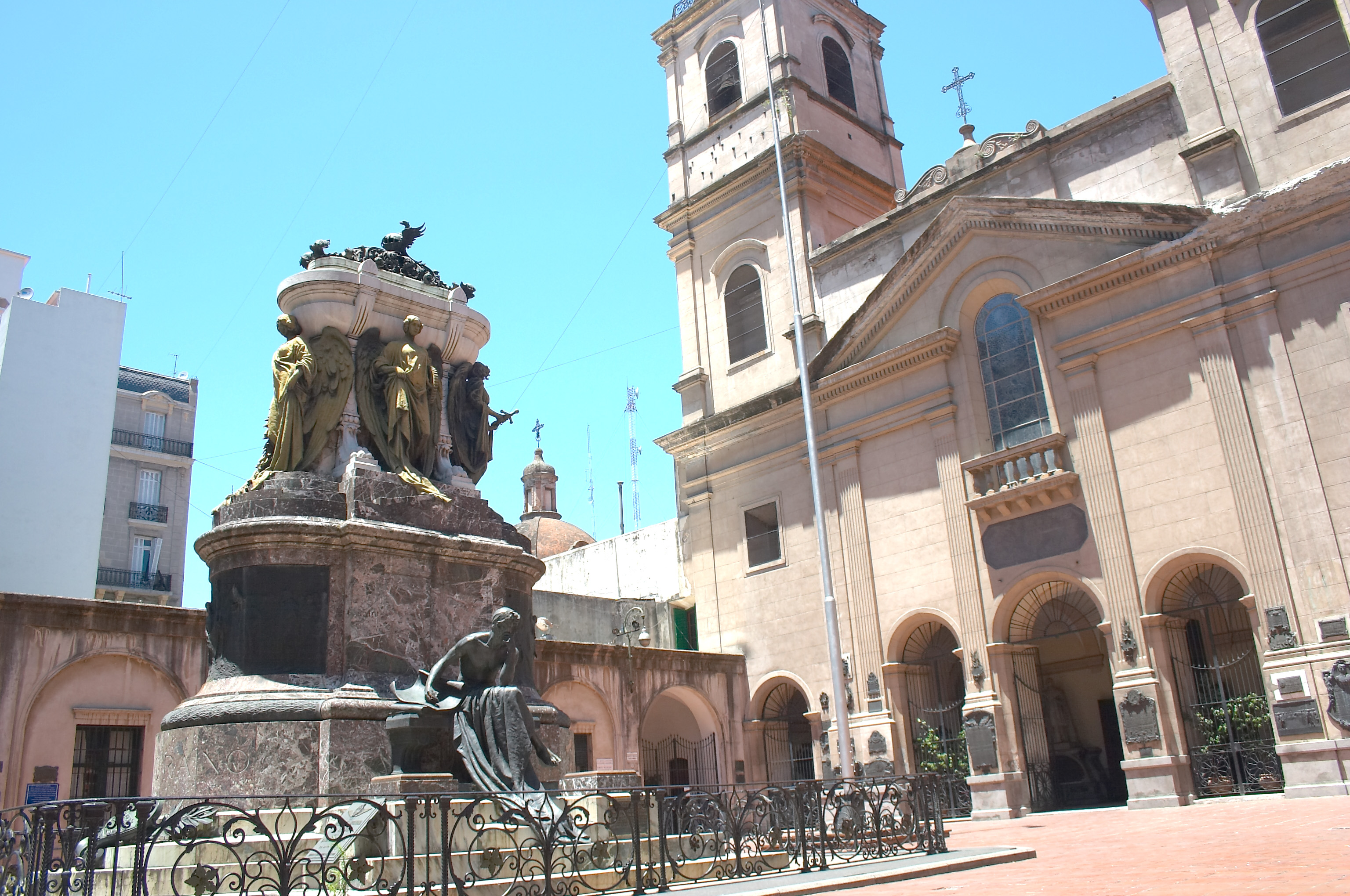
Tomb of Argentine patriot Manuel Belgrano at the Santo Domingo Convent

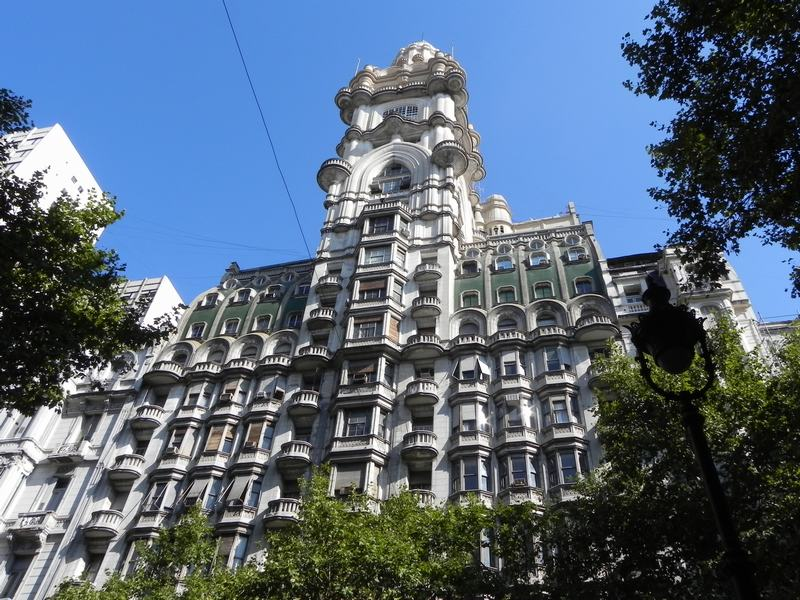
Palacio Barolo

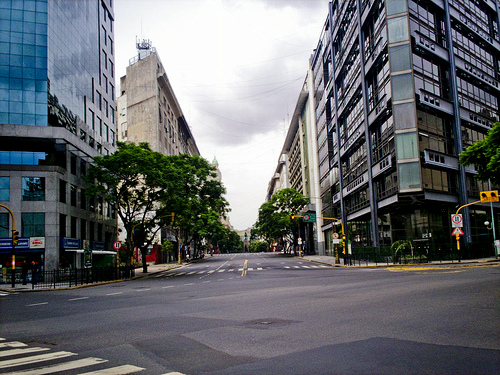
Corner of South Diagonal and Belgrano Avenues

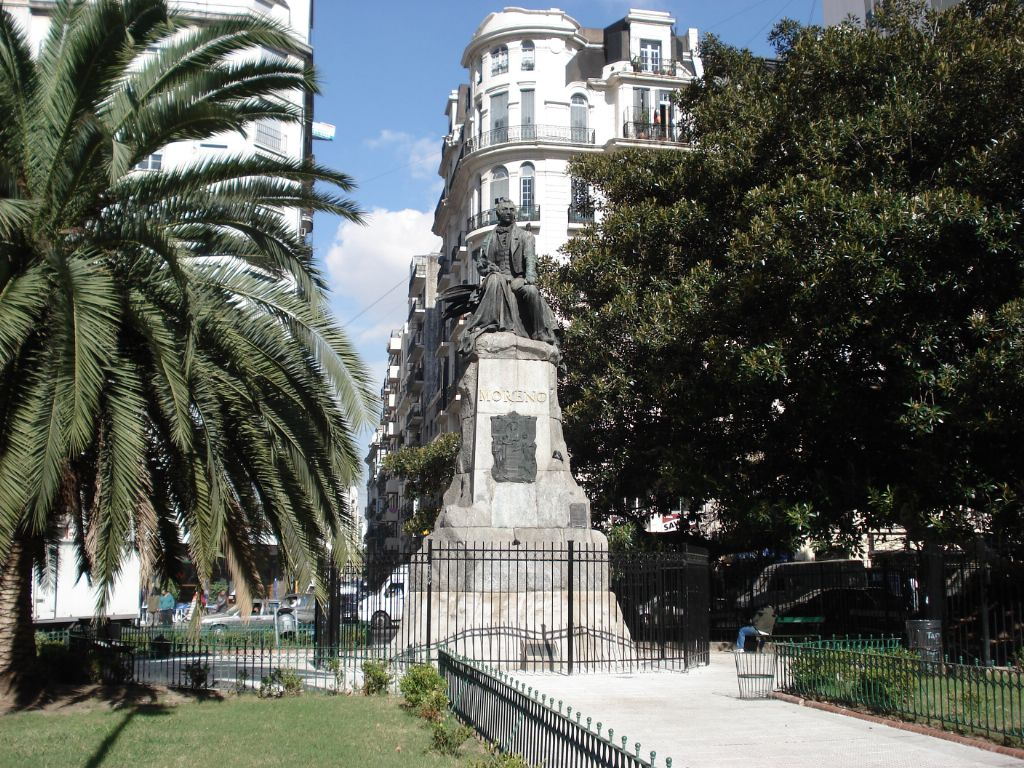
Monument to Mariano Moreno

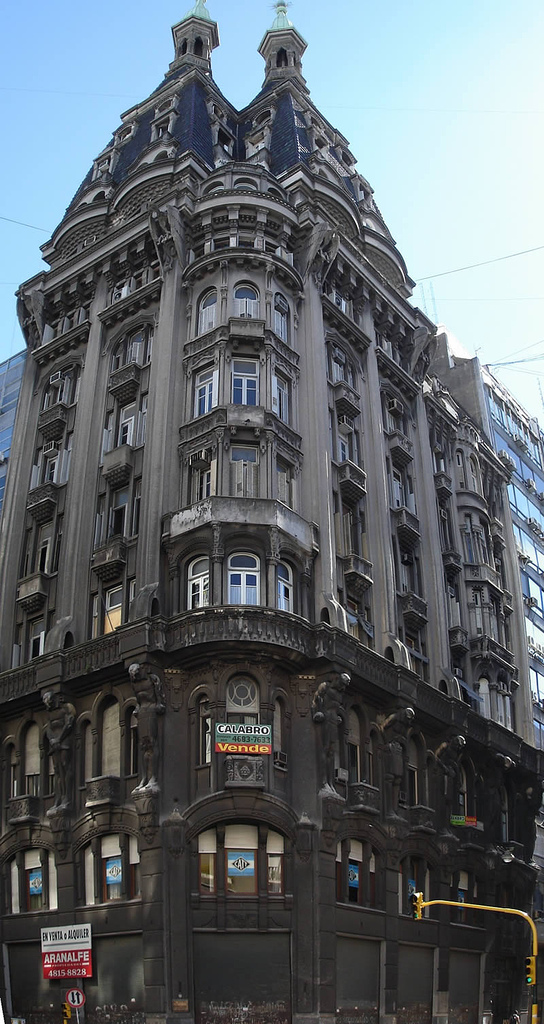
Otto Wulff Building, Belgrano Avenue

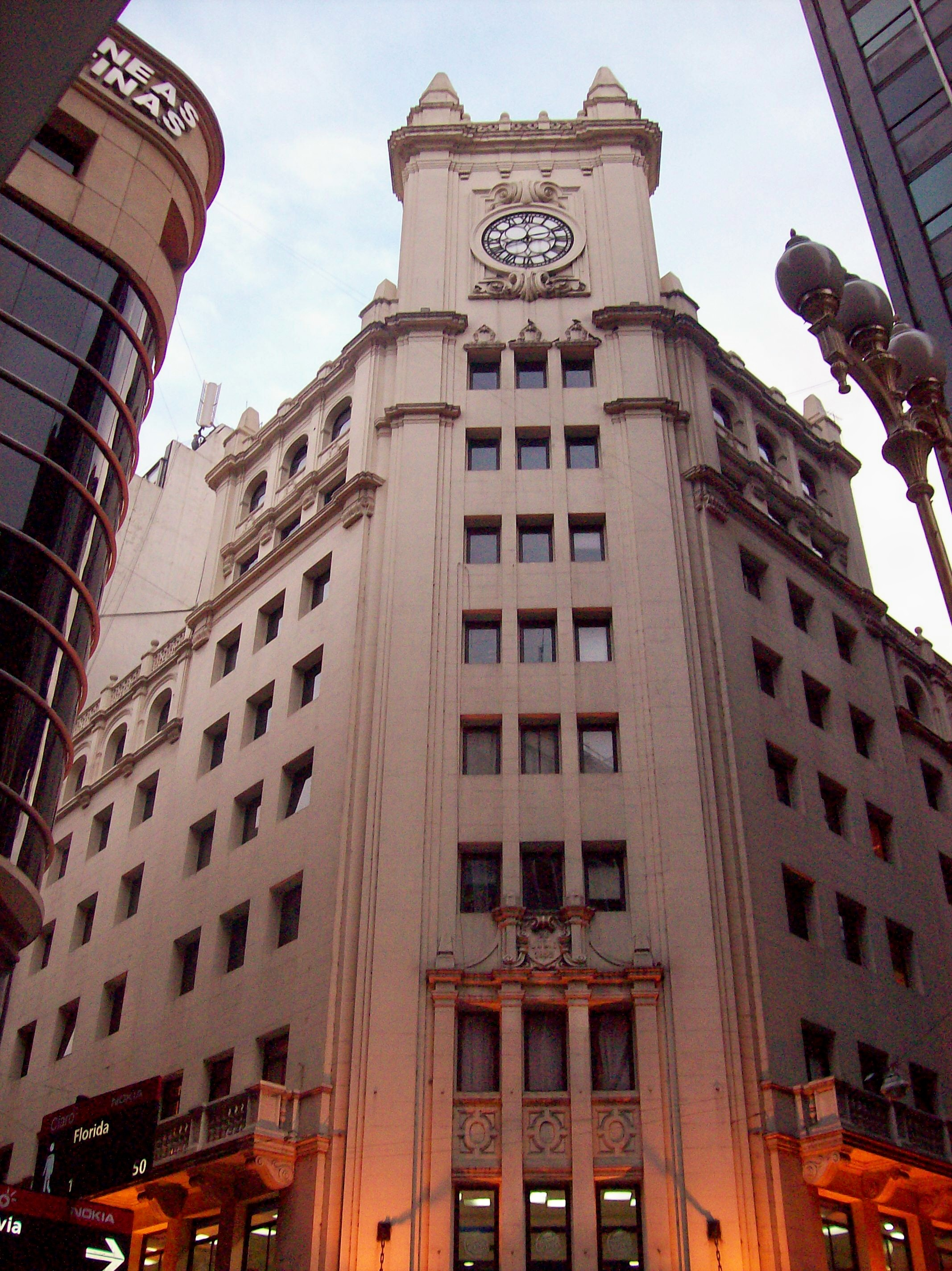
Corner of Florida Street and Rivadavia Avenue

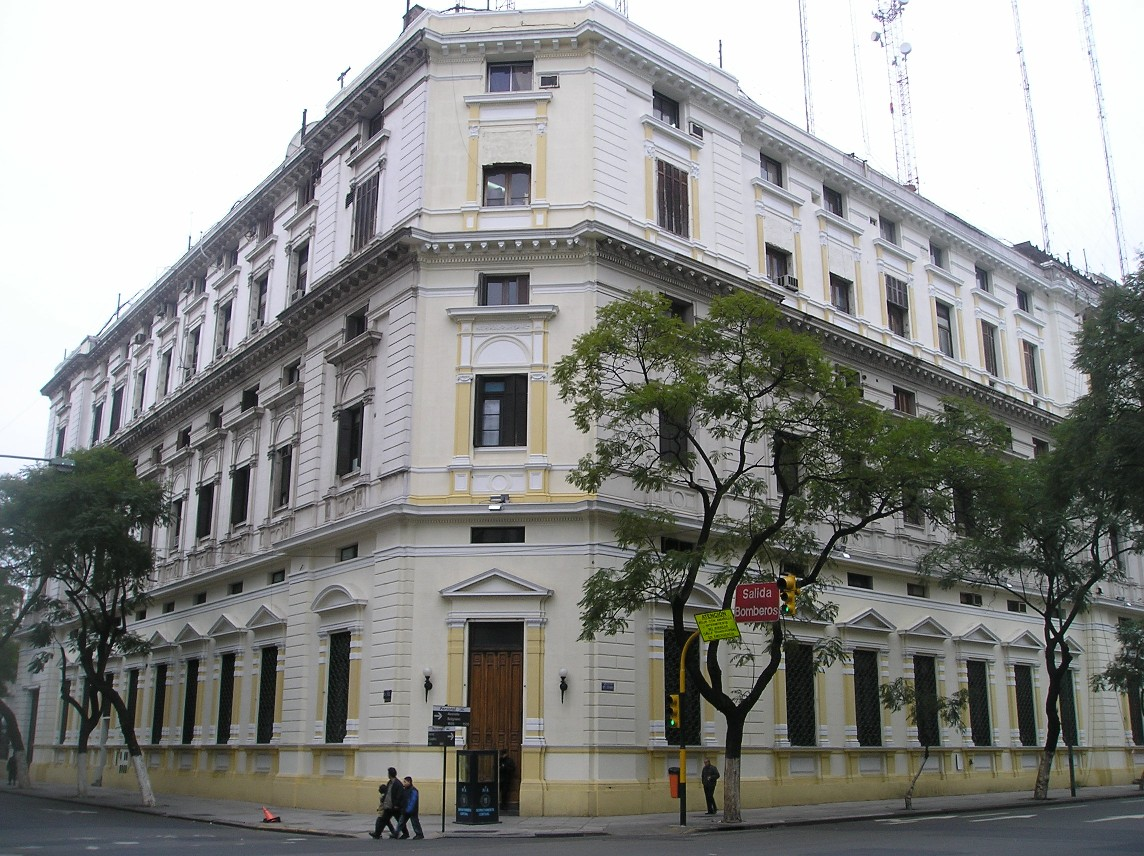
Buenos Aires Police Headquarters

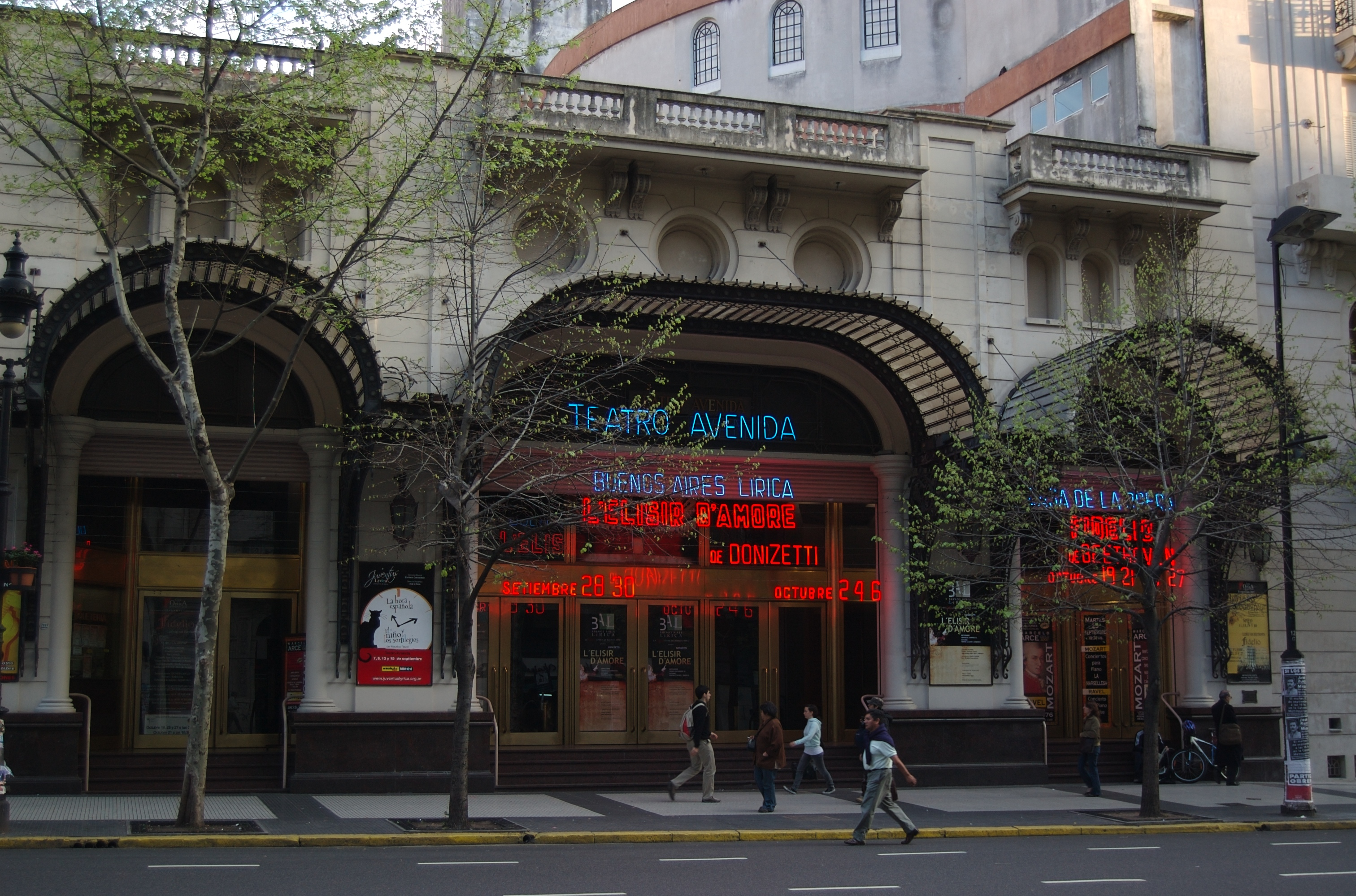
Avenida Theatre
