= Avenida Belgrano =

Street in Buenos Aires, Argentina

Coordinates: 34.6142°S 58.3972°W

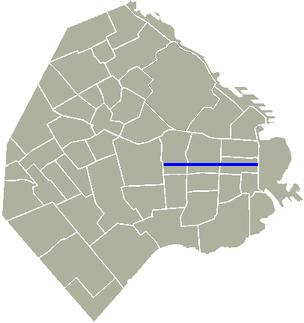
Location of Avenida Belgrano in Buenos Aires.

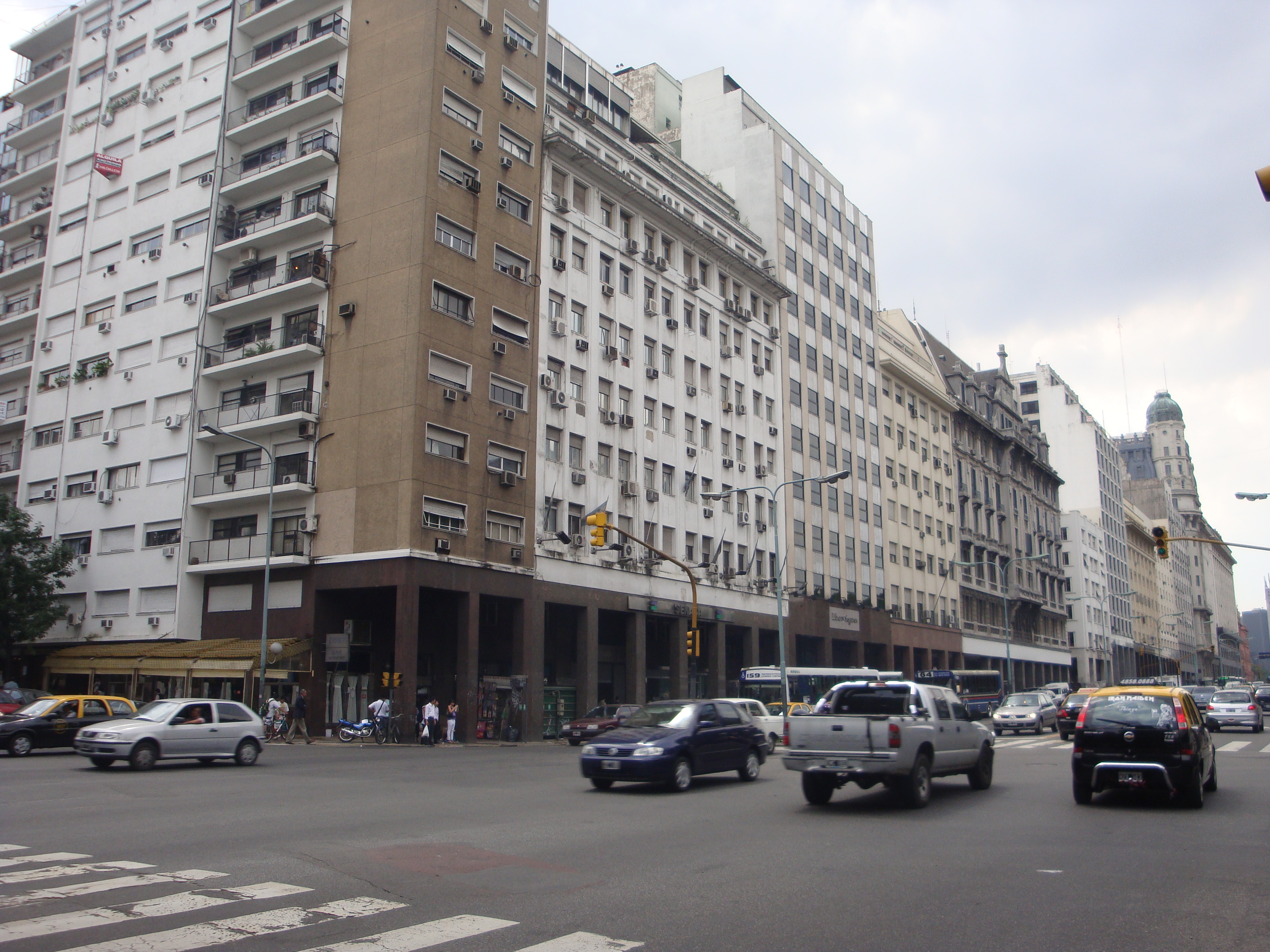
Intersection with Paseo Colon avenue.

Avenida Belgrano is an avenue that runs through Montserrat, Balvanera and Almagro neighborhoods of Buenos Aires, Argentina.

The avenue crosses other major avenues like Huergo, Paseo Colon, Diagonal Sur and 9 de Julio.

The avenue was named in honor of Manuel Belgrano.

== Gallery ==
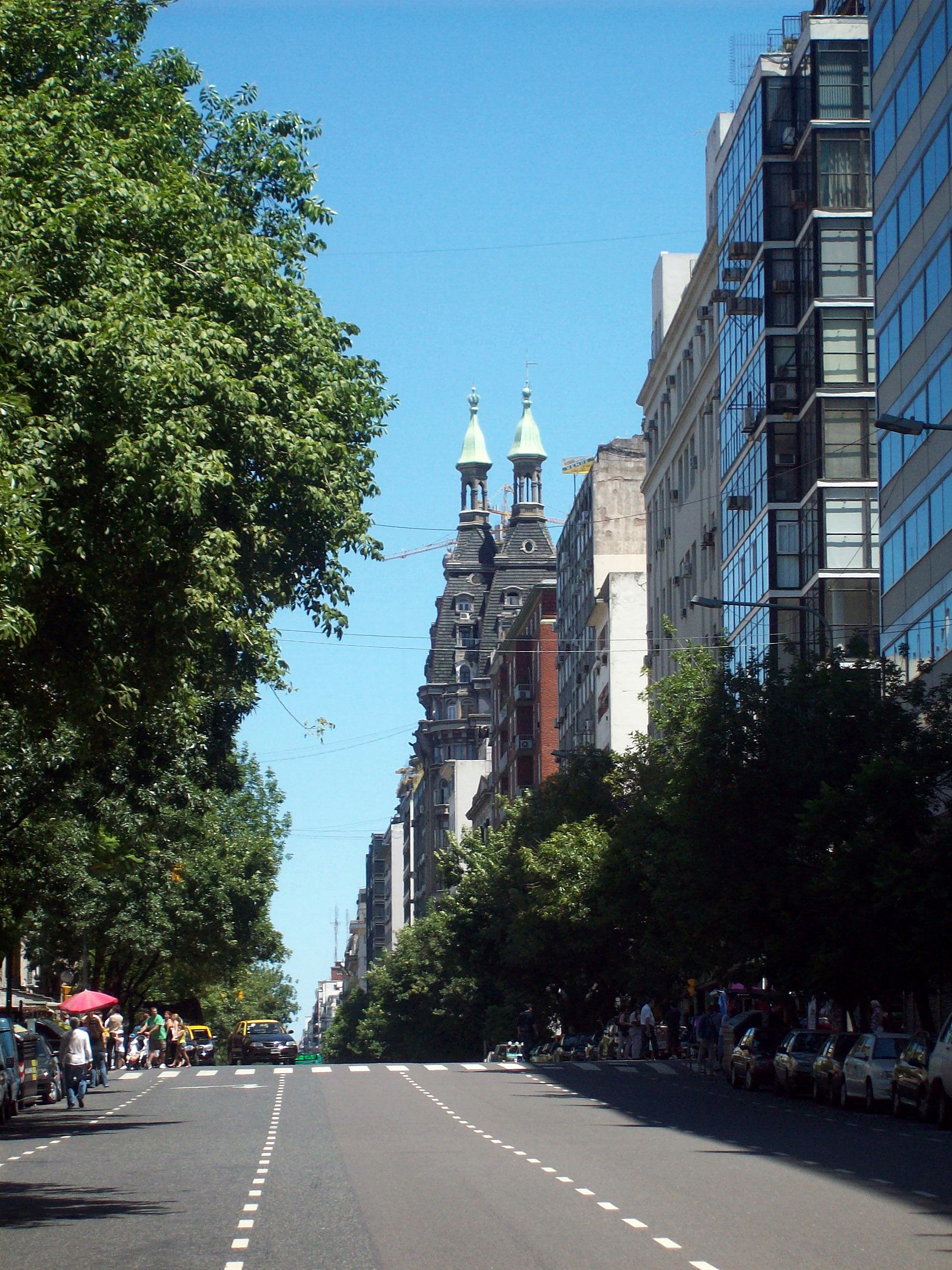
View of Defensa street.

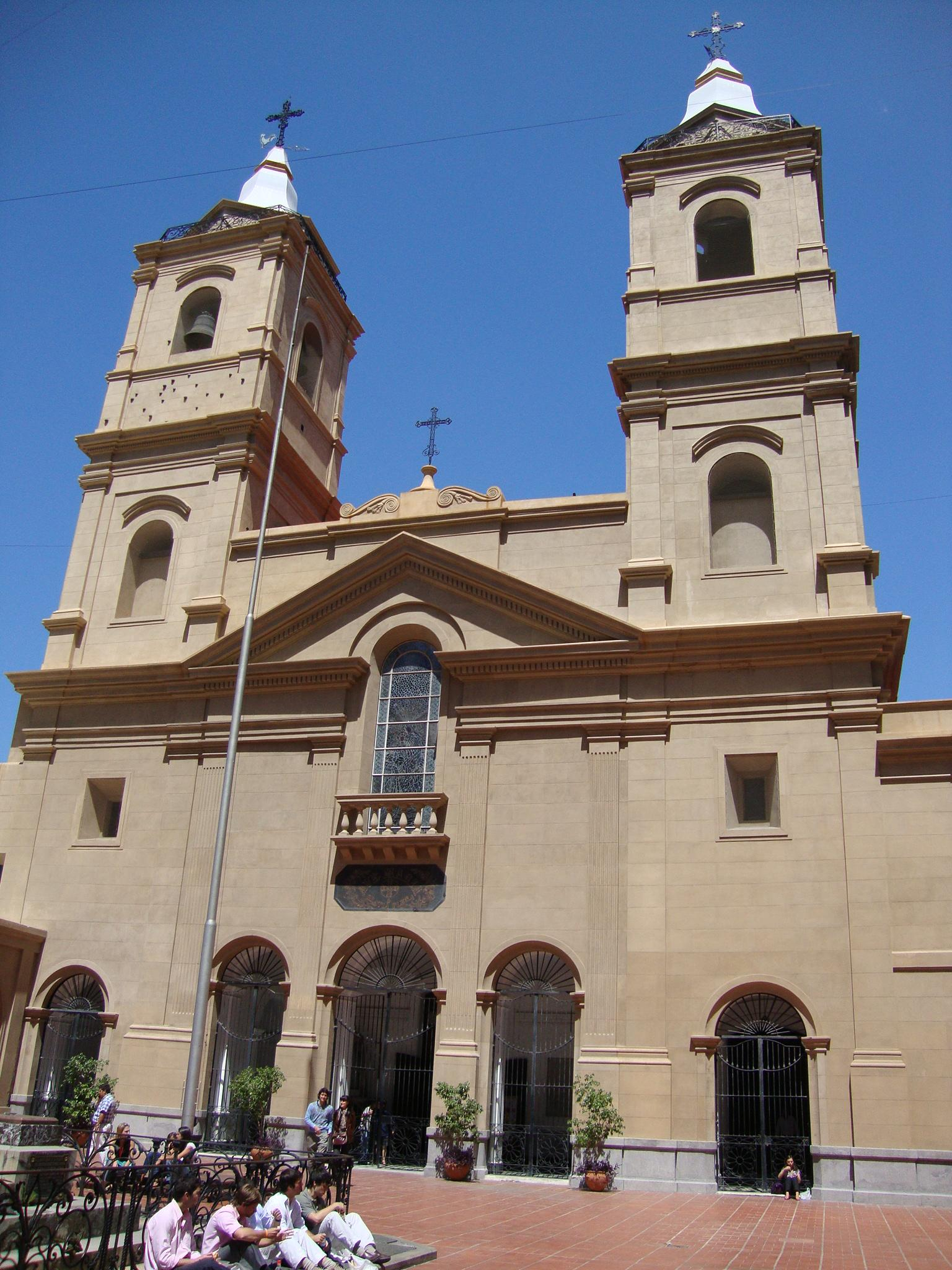
Santo Domingo convent.

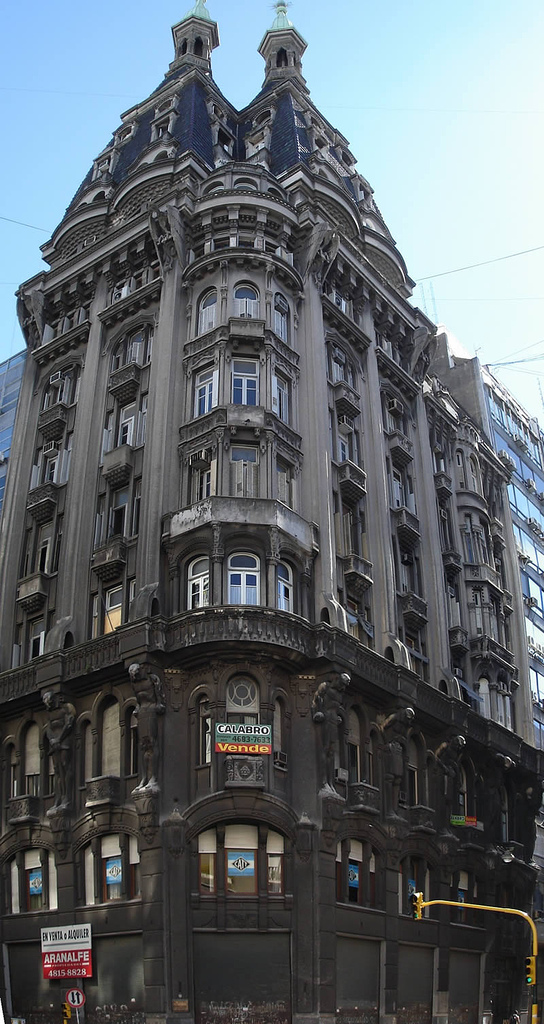
Otto Wulf building.

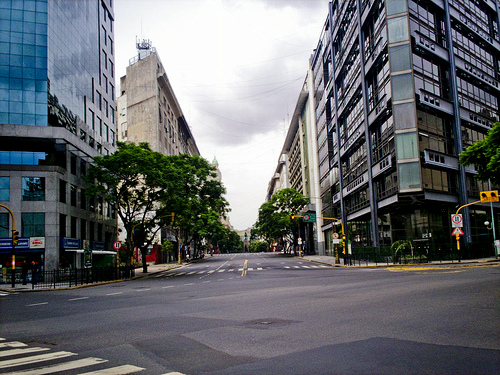
Intersection with Diagonal Sur.

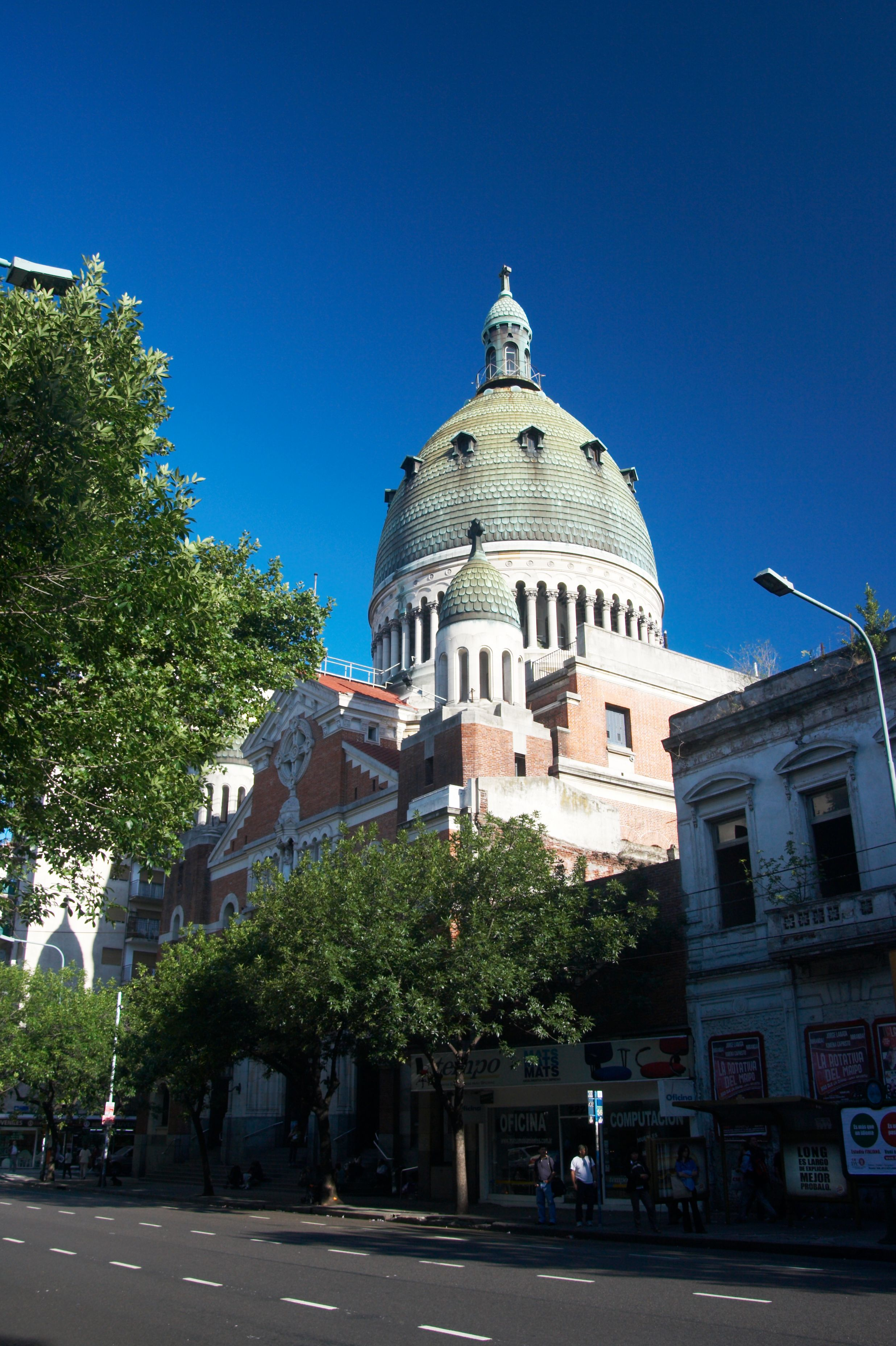
Santa Rosa de Lima Basilic.

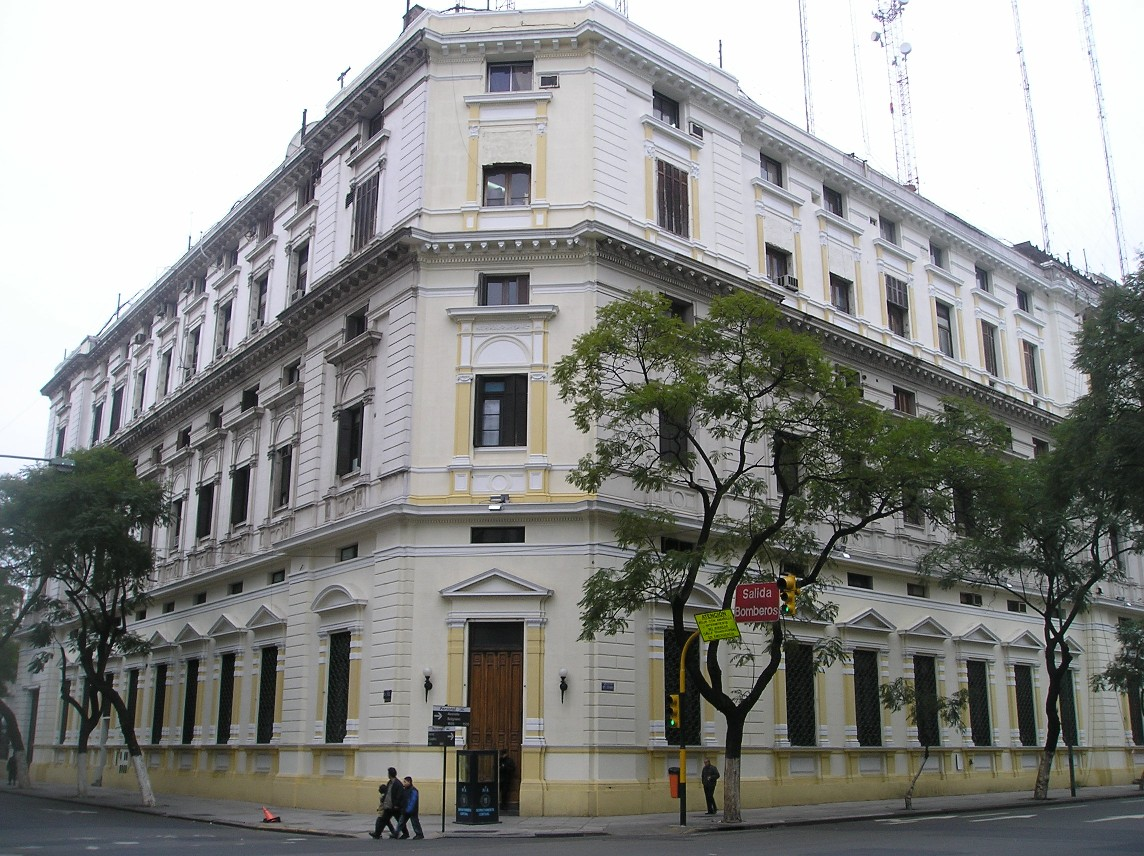
Headquarters of Argentine Federal Police.
