= ARA Uruguay =

Gunboat

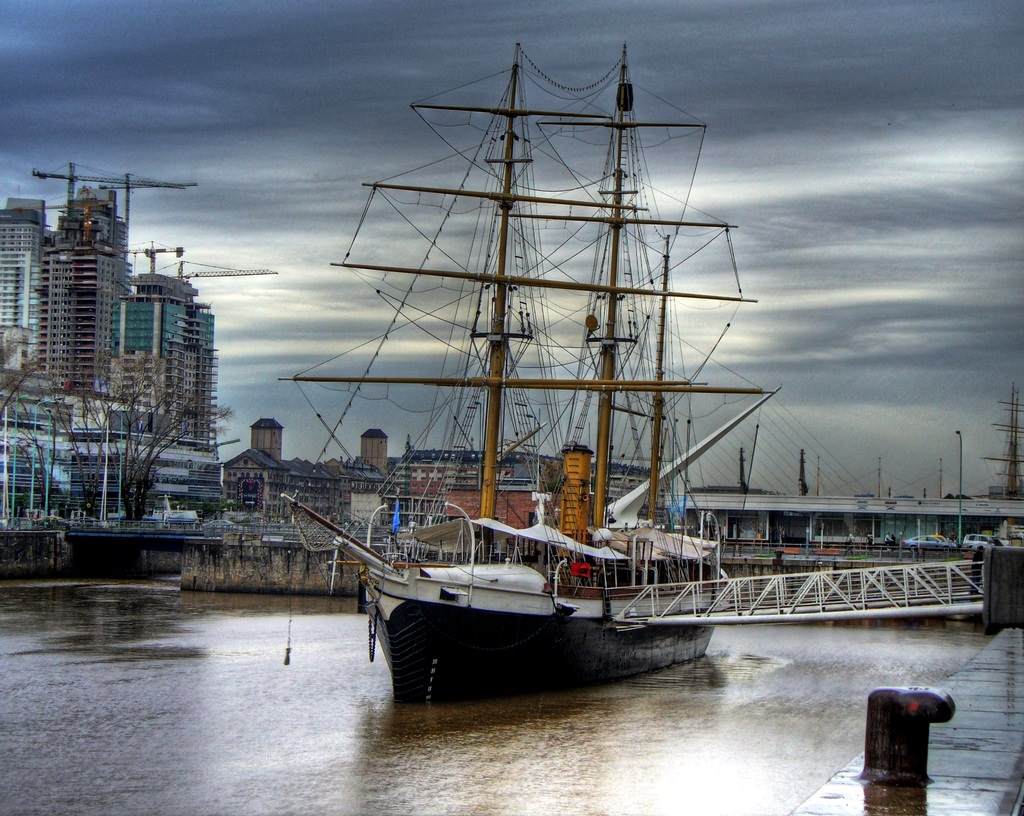
- Uruguay moored at Puerto Madero, Buenos Aires

History

Argentina
- Name: Uruguay
- Namesake: Schooner ARA Uruguay
- Ordered: 1872
- Builder: Laird Brothers, Birkenhead, England
- Launched: 6 March 1874
- Commissioned: 5 July 1874
- Decommissioned: 1926
- Status: Museum ship in Puerto Madero, Buenos Aires
- Coordinates: 34°36′15.2″S 58°21′58.4″W

General characteristics
- Class & type: Steam corvette with auxiliary sails
- Displacement: 550 metric tons (540 long tons)
- Length: 46.36 m (152.1 ft)
- Beam: 7.63 m (25.0 ft)
- Draft: 3.5 m (11 ft)
- Propulsion: Steam, 3-cylinder compound
- Sail plan: Barque
- Speed: Cruising: 6 kn (11 km/h); Maximum: 11 kn (20 km/h)
- Range: 1,500 nmi (2,800 km)
- Armament: Original: 4 × Vavasseur mounted 7 inch (bow, stern, port and starboard); 1880 upgrade: two 90 mm and one 150 mm Armstrong guns; 1893 upgrade: two 120 mm and two 66 mm Armstrong guns

National Historic Monument of Argentina

The corvette ARA Uruguay, is a floating museum ship, berthed at Puerto Madero in Buenos Aires, Argentina. It was built in England and commissioned into the Argentine navy in 1874: it was decommissioned in 1926. The last of the legendary squadron of President Sarmiento, the Uruguay took part in revolutions, expeditions, rescues, and was even floating headquarters of the Navy School. During its operational history 1874–1926 the Uruguay has served as a gunboat, school ship, expedition support ship, Antarctic rescue ship, fisheries base supply ship, and hydrographic survey vessel, and is now a museum ship in Buenos Aires. (Note: [Exploits] "Hazañas Gemela de la Paraná, fueron las primeras llegadas al país de los buques de hierro y vapor adquiridos por el Presidente Sarmiento, desde 1877, fue buque-escuela, recorriendo las costas del sur y reafirmando nuestra soberanía. De ella egresó la primera promoción de la Escuela Naval y, en 1880, dejó de ser buque escuela, sirviendo de transporte y de apoyo de comisiones científicas.") The ship was built in 1874 at Laird Bros. (now Cammell Laird) shipyard of Birkenhead, England, at a cost of £32,000. (Note: [Construction...] "Construcción de la Corbeta Uruguay Construida en los astilleros Cammell Laird Brothers, de Birkenhead (Inglaterra), a un costo de 32.000 libras, según un contrato firmado para dos unidades gemelas (Uruguay y Paraná), con fondos de la ley de armamentos de 1872. Fue botada el 06 de Marzo de 1874.") This ship is rigged to a barque sailplan (three masts, two of which have cross spars). The ship's steel hull is sheathed in teak.

The ship's namesake is an earlier Argentine Navy schooner, a seven-gun combatant in the Battle of Juncal, 1827.

== History ==
=== Construction, building, and delivery (1874) ===
The vessel was built in 1874 at the Laird Brothers shipyard in Birkenhead, United Kingdom, as part of an early programme to modernise the Argentine Navy. Designed as a small but robust gunboat, she combined a steel-reinforced hull with a barque rig, reflecting the transitional naval technology of the period in which steam propulsion was supplemented by sail for extended range and endurance.

Following completion, the ship was delivered to Argentina later that year and commissioned into naval service.

=== Early service: gunboat and training ship (1874–1887) ===
Initially employed as a gunboat, the vessel was soon reassigned to training duties as part of the Navy’s early efforts to formalise officer instruction and seamanship training.

=== Sovereignty expedition to Patagonia (1878) ===
In 1878, the ship took part in Commodore Louis Pye’s expedition to Patagonia, south of the Santa Cruz River, alongside the monitor Los Andes and the gunboat Constitución. The mission formed part of Argentina’s efforts to assert sovereignty over sparsely controlled southern territories during a period of regional tension with Chile. (Note: [Historic Monument] "Monumento histórico...")

=== Naval training headquarters (1887) ===
Following internal disruption within the emerging Argentine Naval Academy,associated with the so-called “Mutiny of the Overcoats” (el Motín de los Gabanes) in Zárate—the vessel was repurposed as a floating headquarters for naval instruction and administration. In 1879, while stationed in Buenos Aires, she hosted the graduation of the Academy’s first class of naval officers.

=== Scientific support and Transit of Venus expedition (1884) ===
In 1884, the vessel supported international scientific commissions deployed to the Argentine coast to observe the Transit of Venus. She served as a transport and logistical platform for astronomical observations conducted in remote coastal regions. (Note: "En 1884, la corbeta sirvió de transporte y buque de apoyo...")

=== Conversion for expeditionary service (1887–1903) ===
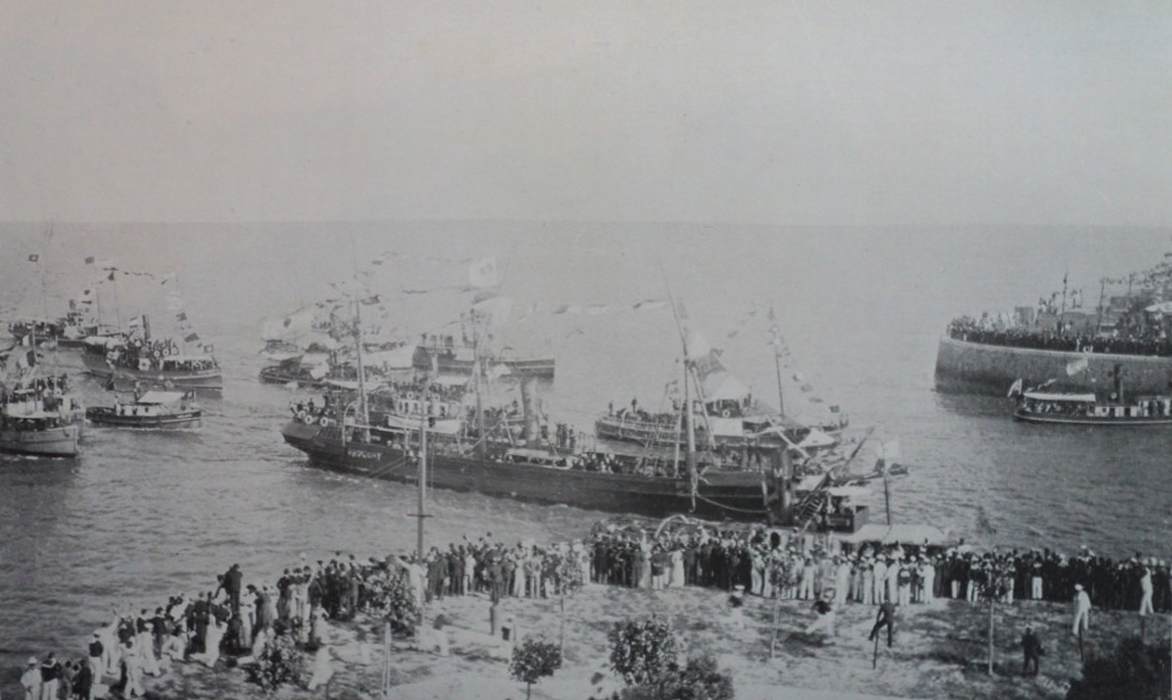
ARA Uruguay in Buenos Aires, c. 1903

In 1887, the ship was withdrawn from training service and extensively rebuilt for long-range expeditionary operations. The refit significantly altered her capabilities: the hull was reinforced, watertight bulkheads were installed dividing the vessel into eight compartments, and a new vertical engine—sourced from the wrecked destroyer Santa Fe—replaced the original propulsion system.

These modifications increased internal volume for coal, fuel, and freshwater storage, improving endurance in remote southern waters. Additional upgrades included heating systems, improved internal communications, removal of bilge keels, and revised sail rigging adapted for harsh southern conditions.

=== Antarctic refit and rescue configuration (1903) ===
In 1903, the vessel underwent a further major reconstruction to prepare for Antarctic rescue operations. The refit strengthened the hull, improved insulation using cork and sawdust, expanded fuel and water capacity, and further adapted rigging for polar navigation. A specially selected crew was assembled for operations in extreme conditions.

=== Rescue of the Swedish Antarctic Expedition (1903) ===
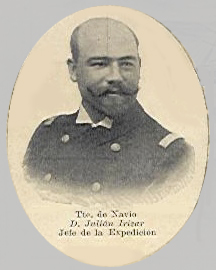
Lieutenant Commander Julián Irízar

Between 1901 and 1903, the vessel carried out her most notable mission: the rescue of the stranded Swedish Antarctic Expedition led by Otto Nordenskjöld. After the expedition ship Antarctic was crushed by ice, the Uruguay, under the command of Lieutenant Commander Julián Irízar, was dispatched to locate survivors and succeeded in rescuing all members of the expedition.

Following a return voyage marked by severe storms and partial dismasting, the vessel reached Puerto Santa Cruz, where news of the rescue was transmitted to Buenos Aires. On 2 December 1903, she arrived in Buenos Aires to widespread public celebration and official honours. (Note: "La llegada a Buenos Aires fue apoteótica...")

=== Support for French Antarctic expedition (1904–1906) ===
The vessel subsequently supported the Third French Antarctic Expedition led by Jean-Baptiste Charcot, providing logistical assistance and transport in Antarctic waters. (Note: "En 1904 volvió a la Antártida en ayuda del sabio Charcot...")

=== Hydrographic work and southern operations (1904–1922) ===
Over the following decades, the ship operated extensively across the Drake Passage, Cape Horn, and sub-Antarctic waters. She supplied Argentine bases in the South Orkney Islands and South Georgia, supported the Sociedad Argentina de Pesca whaling station, and conducted hydrographic and cartographic surveys essential for navigation in the South Atlantic. (Note: "Así con esta pequeña y frágil nave...")

=== Decommissioning and secondary use (1926) ===
After 52 years of service, the vessel was decommissioned in 1926. She was subsequently repurposed as a floating ammunition depot at Río Santiago. (Note: "En 1926... fue radiada;... convertida en polvorín flotante...")

=== Restoration as a museum ship (1954–1962) ===
In 1954, the ship was reconstructed at the Río Santiago Shipyard and restored for preservation. She was later moored near the Naval School and formally withdrawn from active naval service in 1962.

=== Museum ship and national monument (1967–present) ===
In 1967, the vessel was declared a National Historic Monument.

== Gallery ==
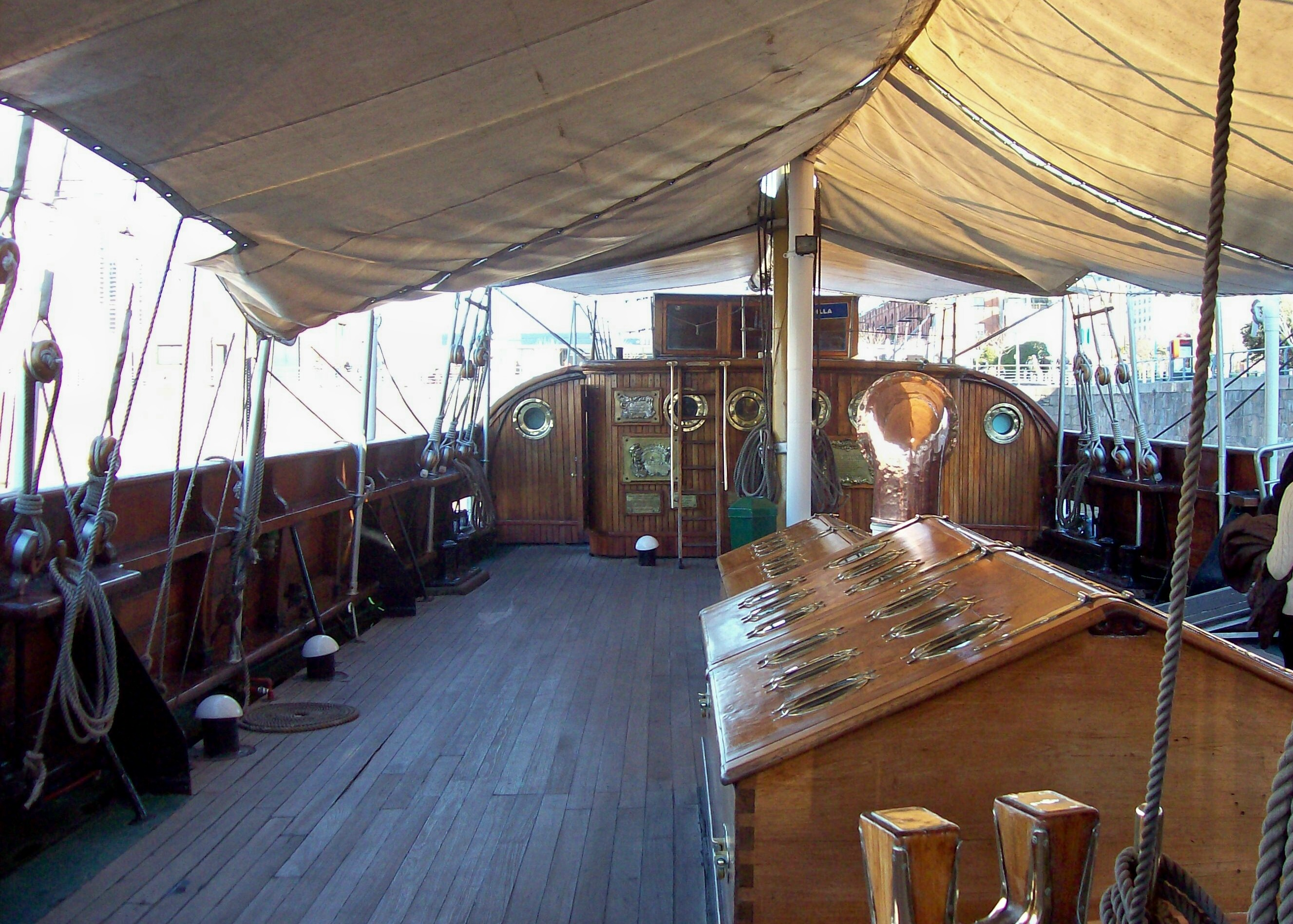
Weather deck, aft

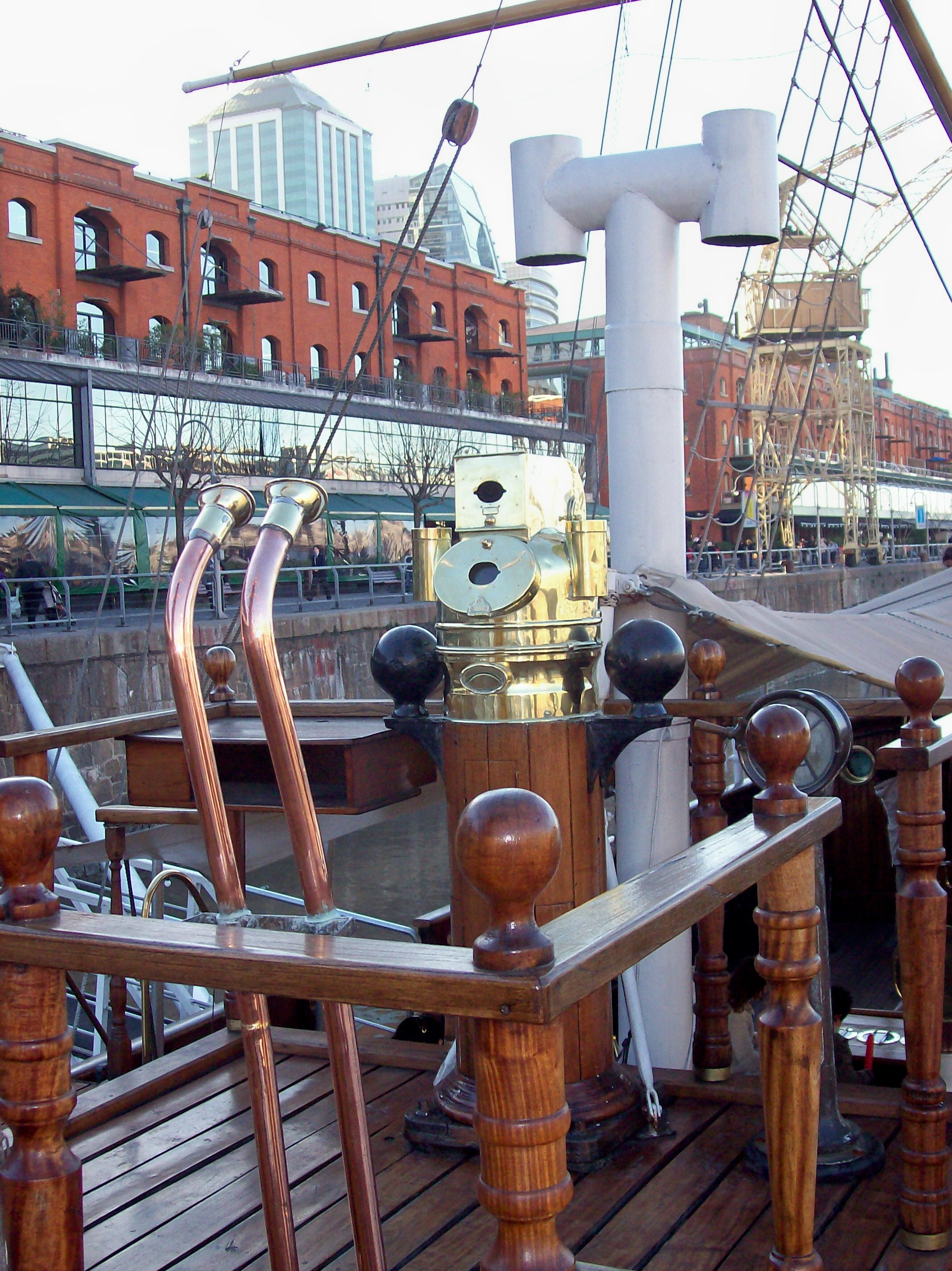
Binnacle

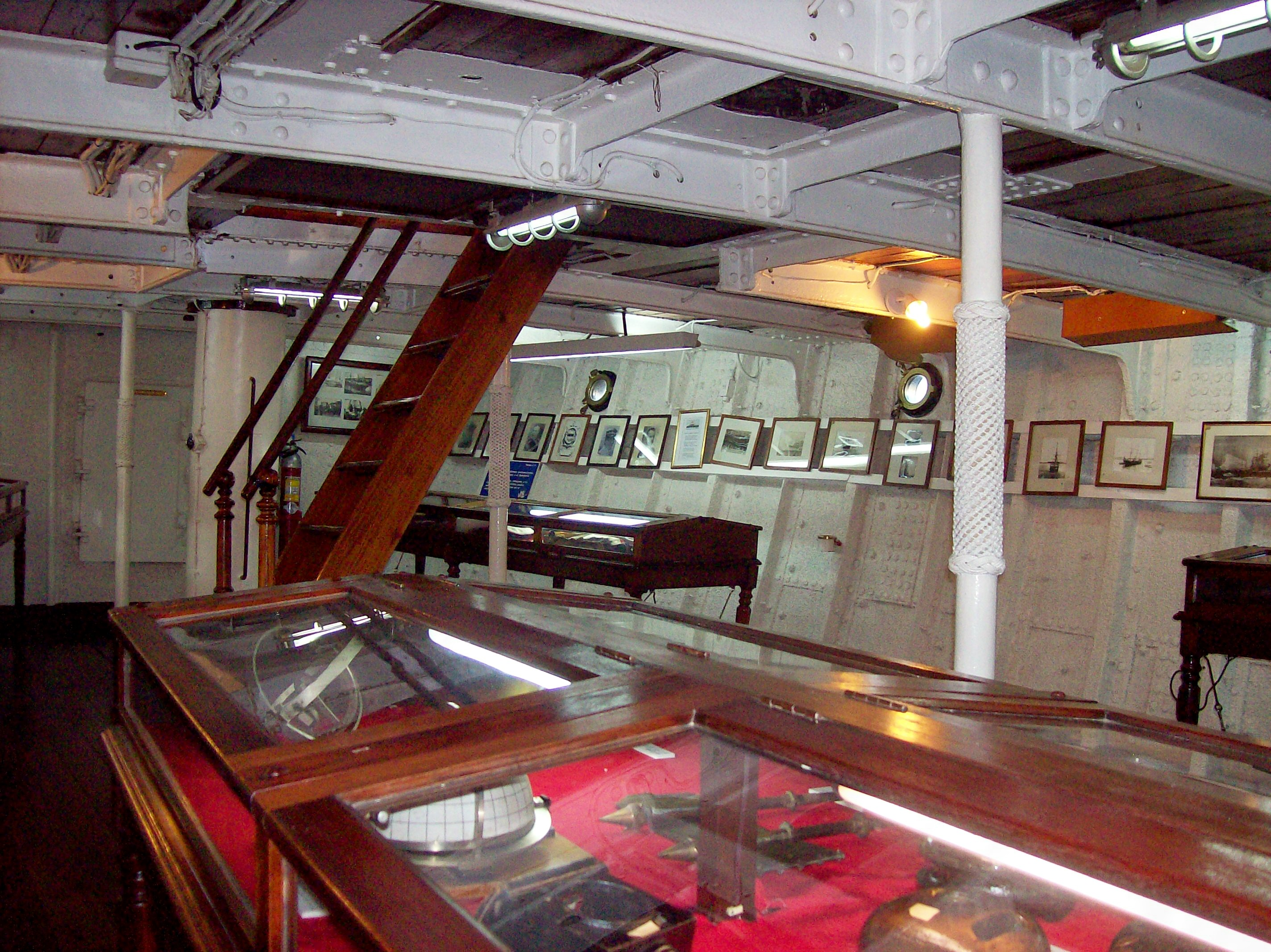
Naval museum exhibits

== See also ==
- List of Antarctic exploration ships from the Heroic Age, 1897–1922
- ARA Presidente Sarmiento, a larger tall ship moored in adjacent basin number four in Puerto Madero
- Corbeta Uruguay, a military outpost established in the South Sandwich Islands 1976 to 1982, named after this ship
- Swedish Antarctic Expedition, concerning the Antarctic rescue
- ARA Paraná, sister ship of the Uruguay
