= Dr. Ángel Gallardo Provincial Natural Sciences Museum =

Public museum in Rosario, Argentina

Coordinates: 32°56′34″S 60°39′00″W

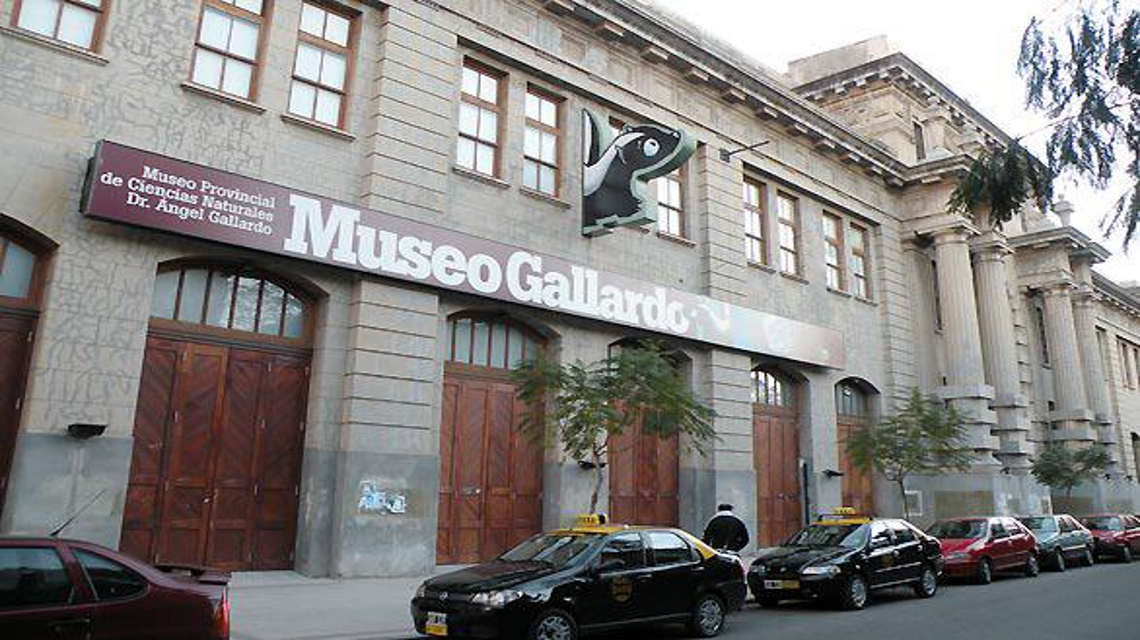
Dr. Angel Gallardo Museum

The Dr. Ángel Gallardo Provincial Natural Sciences Museum (in Spanish, Museo Provincial de Ciencias Naturales Dr. Ángel Gallardo) is a public museum in Rosario, Argentina, specialized in biology. It was founded by Professor Pascual Maciá (a professor and zoologist) in 1945, and is currently administered by the provincial state of Santa Fe.

The museum was formerly located in the National University of Rosario Law School (a national historic monument built in 1889). On July 1, 2003, people attending a demonstration organized by labor unions launched fireworks and other pyrotechnic devices to attract attention, near the building. A fire broke out, forcing its evacuation. The fire damaged or destroyed around 50% of the facilities, including 80% of the museum (with the loss of 11,000 of its 13,000 exhibits).

The reconstruction of the museum required around 2 million pesos (US$660,000). The remaining exhibits were restored, and the seat of the museum was moved one block, to the building that houses the delegation of the provincial government. The museum was re-inaugurated on July 6, 2006, downsized, with a more modern concept including interactive displays.
