= Esteban de Luca =

Argentine military officer and poet

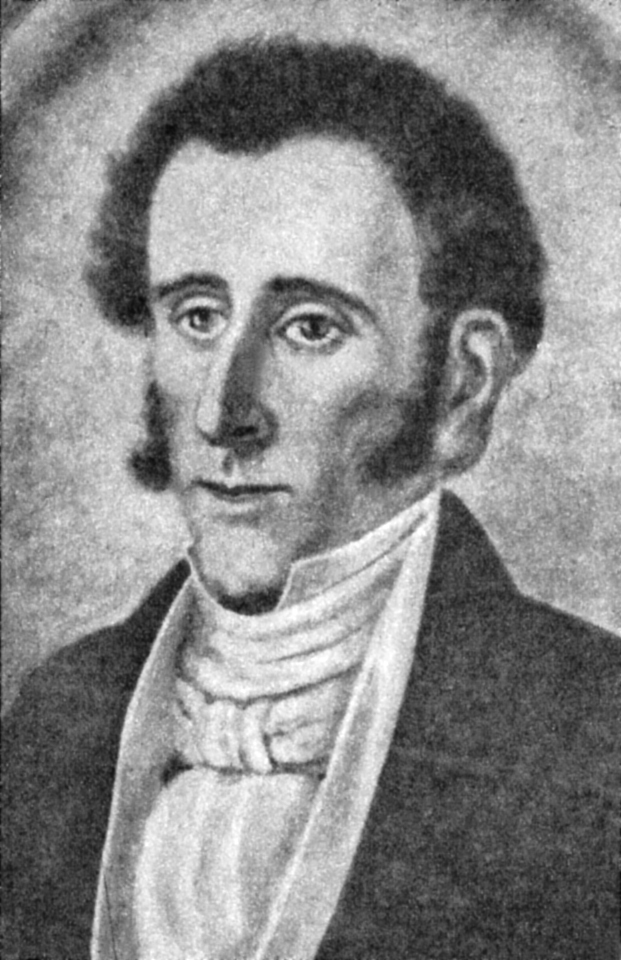
- Born: August 2, 1786; Buenos Aires, Viceroyalty of the Río de la Plata
- Died: May 17, 1824 (aged 37); Río de la Plata
- Writing career
- Genre: Poetry

Esteban de Luca (August 2, 1786 – May 17, 1824) was an Argentine military officer, poet, and government official during the nation's early years.

== Life ==
Esteban de Luca y Patrón was born in Buenos Aires. His mother belonged to a wealthy creole family, and his Italian father was a colonial administrator during the Viceroyalty of Río de la Plata. Educated at the Royal College of San Carlos, de Luca enlisted in the newly formed Patricios Regiment during the British invasions of the Río de la Plata of 1806 and 1807, and attained the rank of Officer.

Shortly after these incidents, in which the invasions were thwarted, de Luca enrolled in the School of Mathematics established by Manuel Belgrano, and became a skilled weapons engineer. He adapted designs for cannons, munitions, and rifles, copying these latter from weapons captured during the earlier conflict.

The May Revolution of 1810 prompted the wars for independence. The United Provinces of South America struggled to supply their troops, however, and in 1813, the Buenos Aires Munitions Works were established by the Primera Junta regime; de Luca was appointed director of the facility in 1814. One of only two such facilities (the other being in Tucumán), the munitions works forged guns, carbines, sabers, cannon, ordnance, and horseshoes mainly with salvaged scrap iron and de Luca's adaptations.

De Luca was also an accomplished poet. He wrote, among other works, odes to General José de San Martín, as well to his victories in the battles of Chacabuco, Maipú, San Martín's Liberation of Peru, and in eulogy to General Manuel Belgrano; his Marcha Patriótica was, from 1812 to 1813, the unofficial Argentine National Anthem.

With the dissolution of the United Province, he put the munitions works at the service of the Province of Buenos Aires, and although these were destroyed shortly afterward in the Battle of Cepeda (1820), de Luca salvaged the facility and maintained it, albeit at minimal levels. A charge brought against him several months later of complicity in a plot by General Carlos María de Alvear against Governor Martín Rodríguez resulted in de Luca's acquittal; the factory, however, closed.

He was among the founders of the Buenos Aires Literary Society in 1822, and wrote for the two leading Buenos Aires periodicals of the time, La Abeja and El Argos. De Luca's columns advocated at length for the westward expansion into the pampas, and he became known also for his translations of works by Italian dramatist Vittorio Alfieri (numerous of whose plays were then produced in Buenos Aires).

De Luca was appointed secretary to diplomatic envoy Valentín Gómez, who in 1823 was entrusted to negotiate for the return of the Banda Oriental (Uruguay) by the Empire of Brazil. As they returned from a May 1824 round of talks in Rio de Janeiro, the brigantine carrying them sank, and although Gómez survived, Esteban de Luca drowned in the Río de la Plata at age 37.

His home in Buenos Aires' San Telmo ward, the Casa de Esteban de Luca, was declared a National Historic Monument in 1941.

== See also ==
- Casa de Esteban de Luca
