= Palace of Justice (Rosario) =

Former courthouse in Rosario, Santa Fe, Argentina

Coordinates: 32°56′38″S 60°39′04″W

- Palacio de Justicia y Tribunales
- The building in 2012
- Interactive map of the Palace of Justice area

General information
- Type: School
- Architectural style: Baroque
- Location: Moreno 750, Rosario, Argentina
- Current tenants: Faculty of Law (UNR)
- Opened: 1889; 137 years ago
- Owner: Municipality of Rosario

Design and construction
- Architects: Herbert Boyd Walker; John Henry Curry

National Historic Monument of Argentina
- Designated: 1997

The Palace of Justice (Spanish: Palacio de Justicia) is a former courthouse in Rosario, Santa Fe, Argentina and current seat of the National University of Rosario's Faculty of Law.

== History ==
Juan Canals, an entrepreneur, commissioned the British architect Herbert Boyd Walker, who conceived and built the Palace of Justice in 1892. The building constitutes a singular example of the eclectic style common at the end of the century. It has a strong French and Italian influence, which can be seen in its two internal galleries and patios, or in its many justice-related sculptures. Perhaps the most notable reference of the building is the tower, which has a bell and a giant clock on its top.

It was built on a plot donated partly by the Rosario City Hall and partly by Canals, who was looking forward to recovering his initial investment after 30 years of collecting rent. Before the construction, the place was occupied by the "Las Carretas" square. The project also included two more buildings: one of them is today an elementary school, while the other one is a detachment of the provincial government.

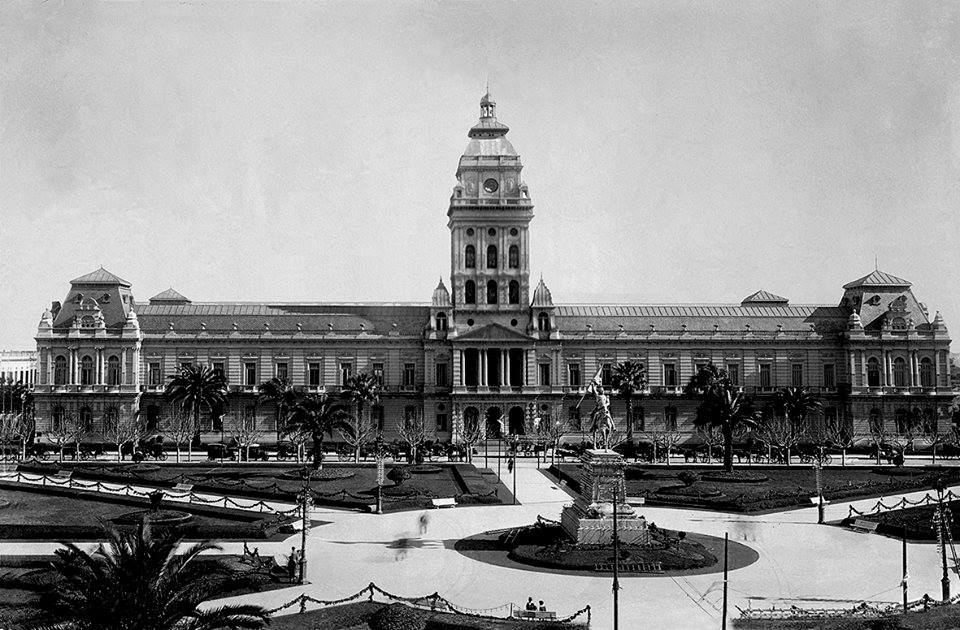
The palace in 1924

In 1912, following Canals' bankruptcy, the property of the buildings was transferred to the provincial government.

Since its creation and until 1960, the edifice was used by the city courts of law. It was known as the "Palacio de Justicia". On 1960 the city courts of law had to move due to the needs of Rosario's growing population. Almost 50 years have passed since then; however, people still refer to the building as the "Ex-Palacio de Justicia".

Shortly after the Courts of Law had moved, the building was used to house a new institution dedicated to the teaching of law and political sciences, as well as the "Gallardo" Natural History Museum on the upper floor. The institution later became the Law and Political Sciences school.

In 1974, the Political Sciences school was given its own building, so all that remained was the Law School and the Natural History Museum.

In 1997, by decree N° 262/97, the building was declared a National Historic Monument.

In 2003, the building caught fire and its eastern wing was severely damaged. As a result, the Dr. Ángel Gallardo Provincial Natural Sciences Museum lost many of its collections, and had to move. Full restoration works began immediately after the fire and continue today. The building is expected to be fully restored and as of 2007, refurbishment works were 90% complete (including a substantial modernization of the facilities).
