= ARA Paraná (1873) =

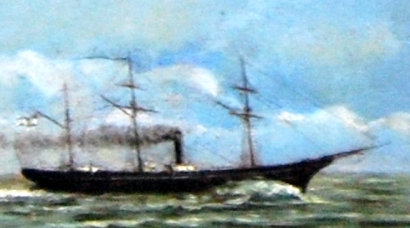
- Steam gunboat ARA Paraná, circa 1874

History

Argentina
- Name: Paraná
- Namesake: the Paraná river
- Ordered: 1872
- Builder: Laird Brothers, Birkenhead, United Kingdom
- Laid down: 1873
- Launched: 12 November 1873
- Completed: 1874
- Commissioned: 1874
- Out of service: 1900
- Fate: Converted to transport and renamed Piedrabuena; wrecked in 1926.

General characteristics
- Type: steam and sail corvette, armed as gunboat
- Displacement: 550 tons
- Length: 46.36 m (152.1 ft)
- Beam: 7.63 m (25.0 ft)
- Draft: 5.4 m (18 ft)
- Propulsion: 1-shaft compound steam engine, 475 ihp (354 kW), 2 cylindrical boilers, 90 tons coal
- Sail plan: Barque
- Speed: 11 knots (13 mph; 20 km/h) under sail and steam
- Complement: 114 (14 officers, 100 crew)
- Armament: Original: 4 × Vavasseur mounted 7 in (17.8 cm) guns (bow, stern, port and starboard); 1879 upgrade: 1 × 150 mm and 2 × 90 mm Armstrong guns (Note: Upgraded in a similar way as her sister ship Uruguay, presumed same armament was installed.)

ARA Paraná was a steam and sail corvette built in United Kingdom in 1873 which served as a gunboat with the Argentine Navy between 1874 and 1899. It was decommissioned in 1900, converted to a transport and renamed Piedrabuena.

It was the sixth ship of the Argentine Navy named after the Paraná river; its name was chosen by President Sarmiento.

== Design ==
Paraná was a steam corvette rigged as a barque, with a steel hull covered in wood planks. She was powered by a 475 HP compound steam engine with two cylindrical boilers, driving a 2-paddle Bevis-type propeller. It could reach a speed of 11 knots (13 mph; 20 km/h) under sail and steam, or 10 knots (12 mph; 19 km/h) under steam only.

Her main battery, as built, was composed of four Vavasseur mounted 7 in (177.8 mm) guns, mounted one at the front of the funnel, another behind it, and one per side. As refitted in 1879, it included one 150 mm (5.9 in) (bow) and two 90 mm (3.5 in) (one per side) Armstrong guns. (Note: Paraná was upgraded at nearly the same time as its sister ship Uruguay, so the same armament is presumed was installed.)

== History ==
Paraná was ordered in 1872 as part of the so-called "Sarmiento’s Squadron", authorized by the Naval Law of 1872 to enhance the Argentine Navy after its performance in the Paraguayan War. Construction was contracted at a cost of £ 32,000 to the shipyard of Laird Brothers, at Birkenhead; together with her sister ship Uruguay.

She was ferried to Argentina by a British crew, departing Birkenhead in April 1874 and arriving in Buenos Aires at the end of that month; being commissioned into the Argentine Navy on 2 May 1874. Her first commander was Sargento Mayor de Marina Ceferino Ramírez, who was removed from command when the crew joined the September 1874 Revolution. After the failure of the revolution, Paraná was surrendered in the Uruguayan port of Maldonado, and returned to Argentina in late November 1874.

Between 1876 and 1877 Paraná was assigned to Asunción del Paraguay, commanded by Captain Augusto Lasserre. From 1878 to 1884 she sailed several times to Patagonia, with a trip to Rio de Janeiro in July–December 1882. In 1879 she was refurbished, including changing her armament. Between April and November 1884 she participated in the Argentine expedition to the South Atlantic to implement the Boundary Treaty of 1881, which concluded with the possession of Ushuaia on 12 October. She returned to Buenos Aires in late November 1884.

From 1885 to 1889 she performed various tasks in the Paraná, Uruguay and de la Plata rivers, including carrying out hydrographic surveys.

In 1894 she was repaired and modernized, including replacement of the boilers. During 1895, 1897 and 1898 was assigned to transport duties; and in 1899 was disarmed. In 1900 she was reclassified as a transport ship and renamed Piedrabuena.

== See also ==
- List of ships of the Argentine Navy
- ARA Uruguay
