= Illuminated Block =

Historical landmark in Argentina

Coordinates: 34°36′38″S 58°22′28″W

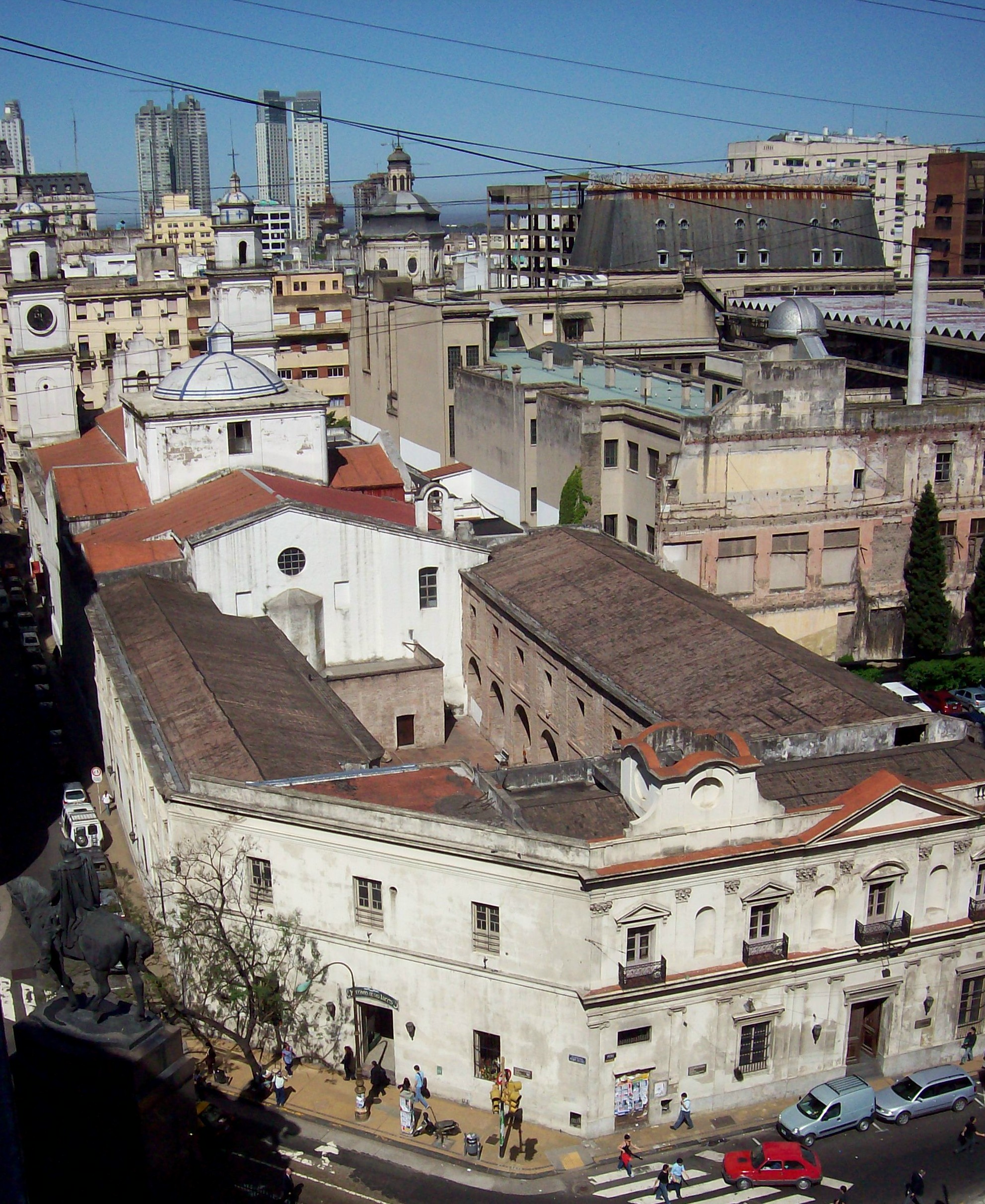
The Illuminated Block

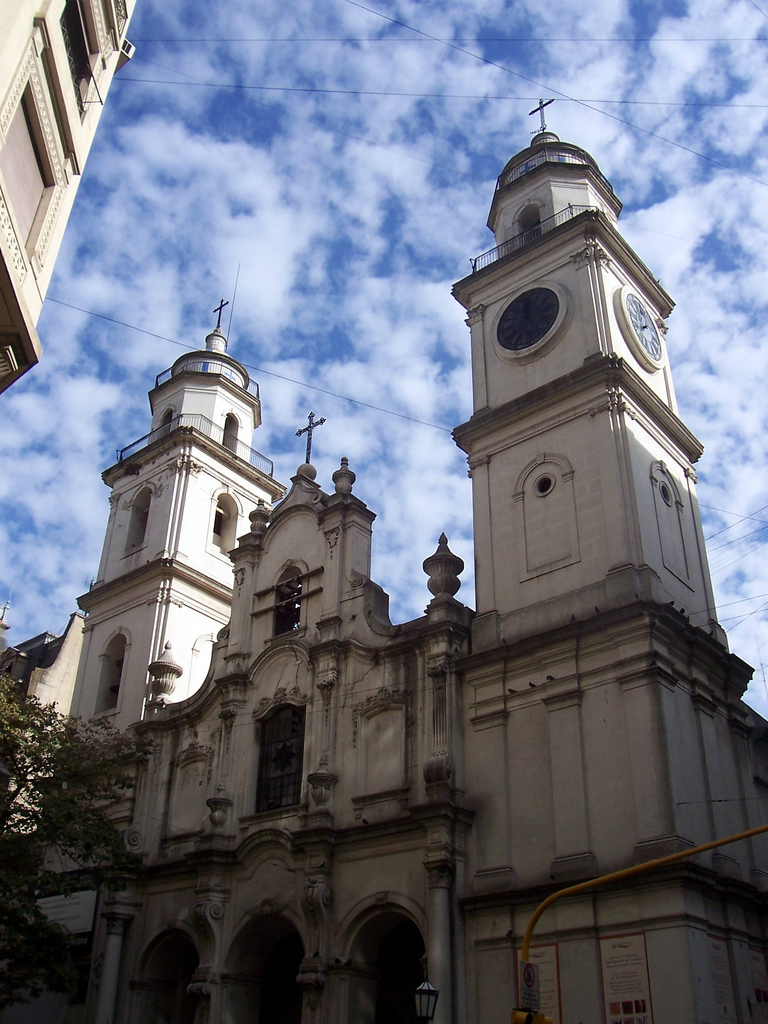
Parish of St. Ignatius of Loyola

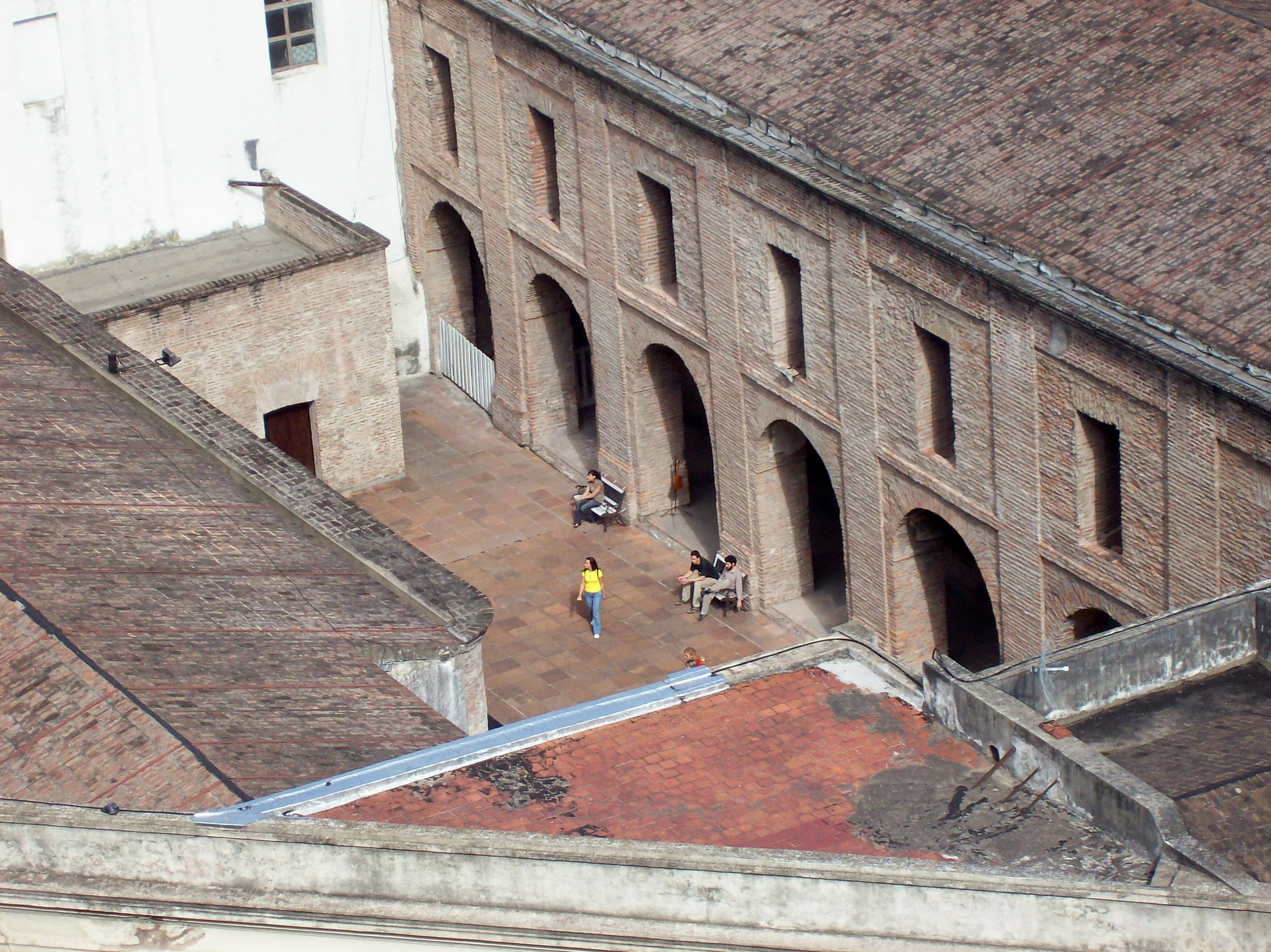
Patio

The Illuminated Block (Spanish: Manzana de las Luces) is a historical landmark in the Monserrat neighbourhood of Buenos Aires, Argentina.

== History ==
The Society of Jesus arrived in the newly founded village of Buenos Ayres in 1608, establishing their first mission on a 2 hectare (5 acre) lot which had earlier been destined by Spanish conquistador Juan de Garay for the future town square. The Jesuits' 1661 sale of the property (which would ultimately become the Plaza de Mayo) and a gift of an adjacent lot by Isabel de Carvajal allowed the order to build a new, largely self-reliant mission. Work began in 1686 on the Saint Ignatius Church, a baroque structure completed in 1722, and the adjoining College of St. Ignatius was designed by local architect Juan Kraus and built between 1710 and 1729. Becoming the only academy in colonial Buenos Aires to provide a classical education, and the property possessed the city's finest laboratories, museum and library. The center housed the Office of the Advocate General of the Missions (which oversaw the order's numerous, lucrative Indian Reductions), as well as a pharmacy (the city's first) opened and operated by an English Jesuit, Father Thomas Falkner.

The 1767 suppression of the Society of Jesus led to the mission's closure, however, as well as an associated one housing a hospital, in the nearby San Telmo district. The academy was closed only temporarily, and was converted in 1772 into the Royal College of San Carlos. The temple was usurped and converted into a cathedral in 1775, though Father Falkner's pharmacy formed the basis for Viceroy Juan José de Vértiz's Medical Court of 1780 - the first school of medicine in what is today Argentina. Viceroy Vértiz also established the city's first printing press at the site, in 1780, as well as an orphanage funded by sales of the facility's printed material.

The center later had an anecdotal role in the Argentine War of Independence. The Regiment of Patricians was briefly headquartered in 1811 at the college, where the regiment staged a failed mutiny against their commander, General Manuel Belgrano. A network of five tunnels intersecting under the former mission (believed to have been built to guarantee the flow of supplies in the event of a siege, and to facilitate smuggling in peacetime) helped safeguard ammunitions during much of the war. The provisional government organized from the May Revolution of 1810, the First Assembly, opened a public library in 1812, and following the War of Independence, Governor Martín Rodríguez inaugurated the University of Buenos Aires and the General Archive, in 1821. A few days later, the city's leading newspaper, El Argos, described the area as the "Illuminated Block" in a September 1, 1821, editorial.

Governor Rodríguez also established the Provincial Legislature and the Bank of the Province of Buenos Aires at the site, in 1822, as well as the city's first natural sciences museum (later housed in the nearby Santo Domingo convent). A secondary school established in 1817 in the Illuminated Block by Juan Martín de Pueyrredón eventually became the Buenos Aires National College, one of the nation's most prestigious university-preparatory schools, in 1863.

The Provincial Legislature was used as the Argentine National Congress during the short-lived First Republic (1826–27), and was again used as such from 1862 to 1864, while newer facilities were built nearby. The Buenos Aires City Legislature also met at the site from 1894 to 1931, when its current building was completed. The old Provincial Legislature's final use was as the University of Buenos Aires School of Architecture (until 1972).

The Illuminated Block was declared a National Historic Monument, in 1942, and was (with three of the catacombs) extensively restored, in 1983.

== See also ==
- List of Jesuit sites
