= St. Ignatius Church (Buenos Aires) =

Church in Buenos Aires, Argentina

Church of Saint Ignatius (Iglesia de San Ignacio)
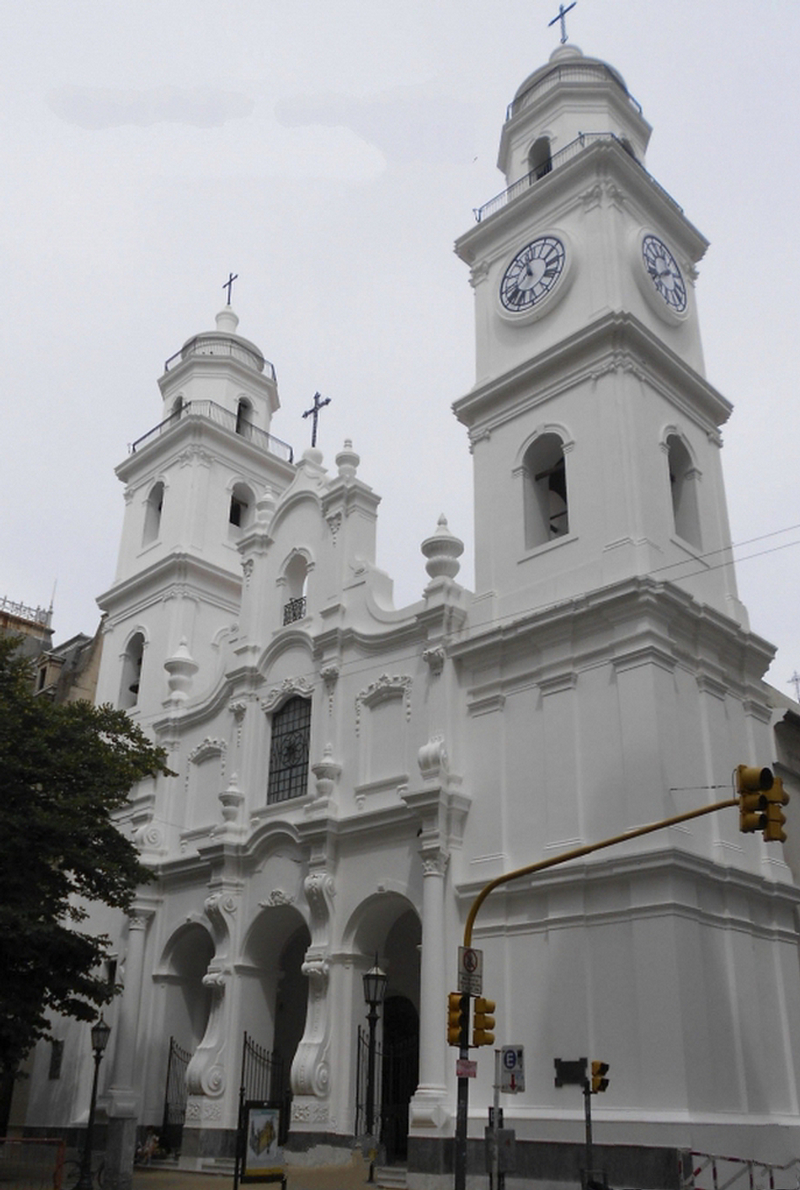

Religion
- Ecclesiastical or organisational status: Paris Catholic Church (Jesuit)

Location
- Location: Buenos Aires, Argentina
- Interactive map of Church of Saint Ignatius (Iglesia de San Ignacio)
- Administration: Archdiocese of Buenos Aires
- Coordinates: 34.6105°S 58.3739°W

Architecture
- Architects: Juan Krauss, Andrea Bianchi, Giovanni Battista Prímoli, Juan Wolff and Pedro Weger
- Style: Silver River Baroque
- Completed: First church, 1675; Present church, 1686–1722 (consecration in 1734)

Website
- sanignaciodeloyola.org.ar

Saint Ignatius of Loyola' Church (Spanish: Iglesia de San Ignacio de Loyola) is a Roman Catholic church situated at the Illuminated Block, in Buenos Aires's neighbourhood of Montserrat. The first building, which was made of adobe, was built by the Society of Jesus in 1675. The southern tower and the present facade were built in 1686, and the rest of the Church construction started in 1712. Today's church was completed in 1722 and consecrated in 1734.

Saint Ignatius is the oldest church preserved in Buenos Aires, and was declared a National Historic Monument in 1942. On June 16, 1955, during a government campaign against the Church, after a failed revolution against Juan Domingo Perón's government, Peronist mobs burnt most churches of Buenos Aires, including Saint Ignatius.

== Gallery ==
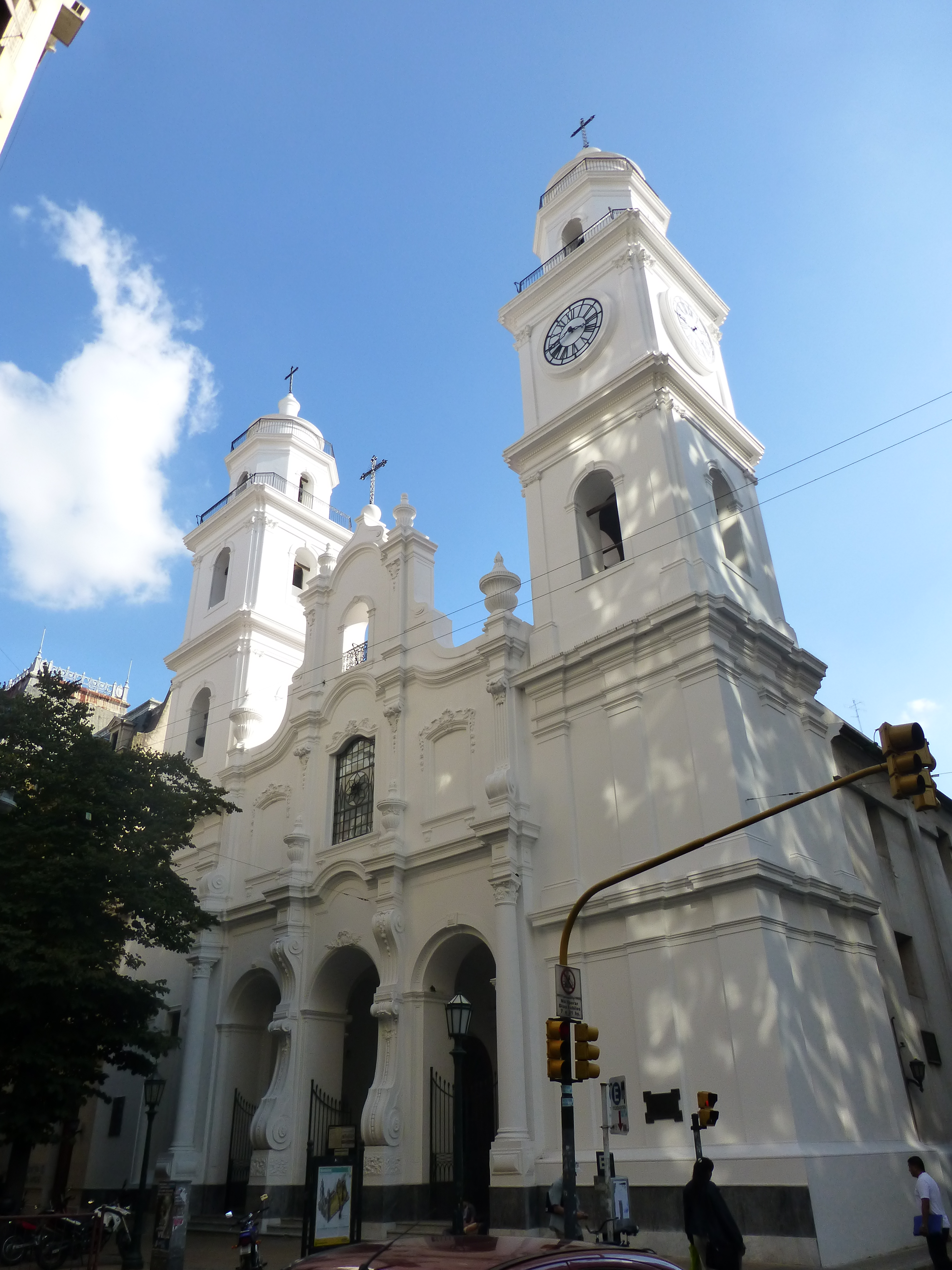

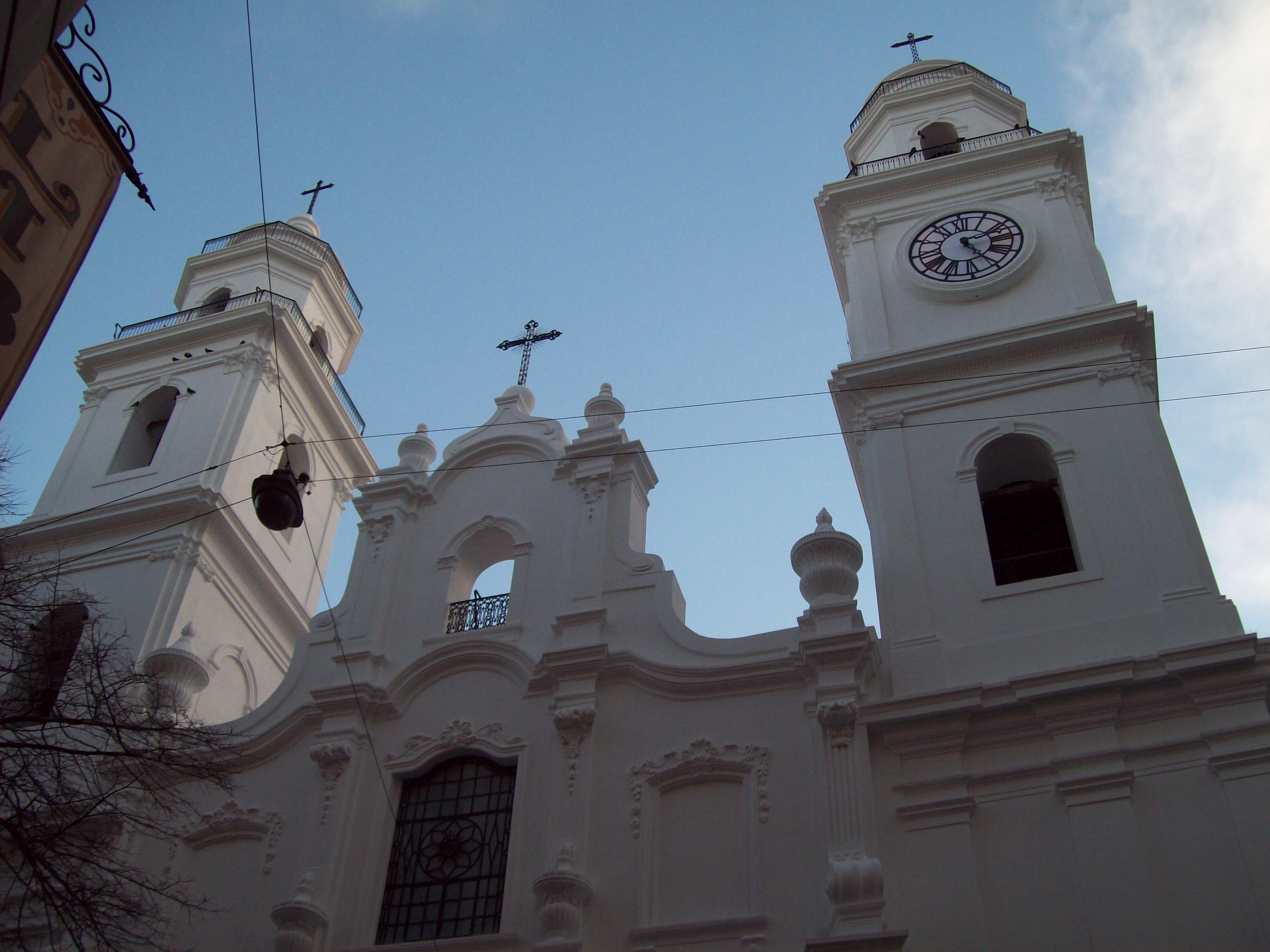

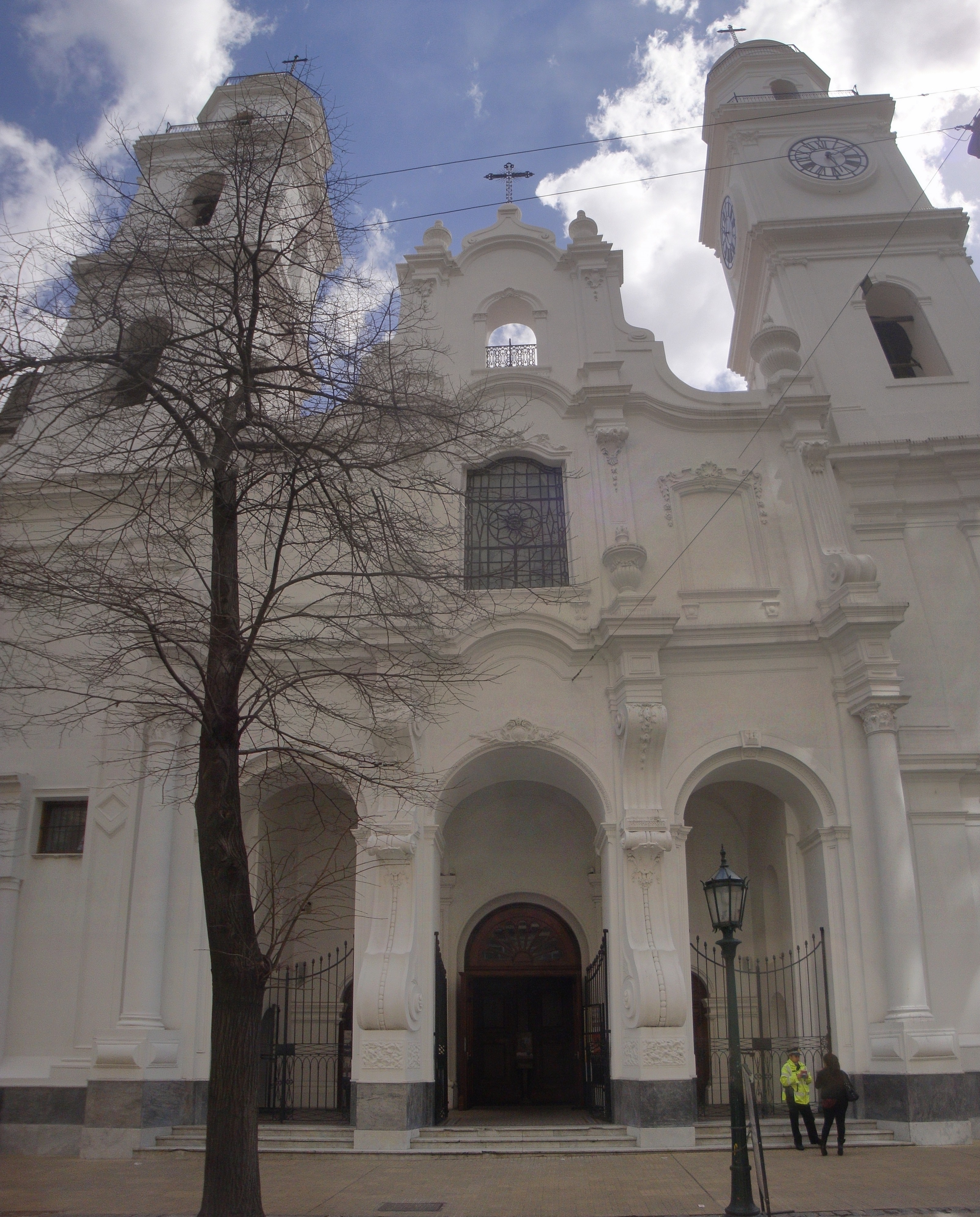

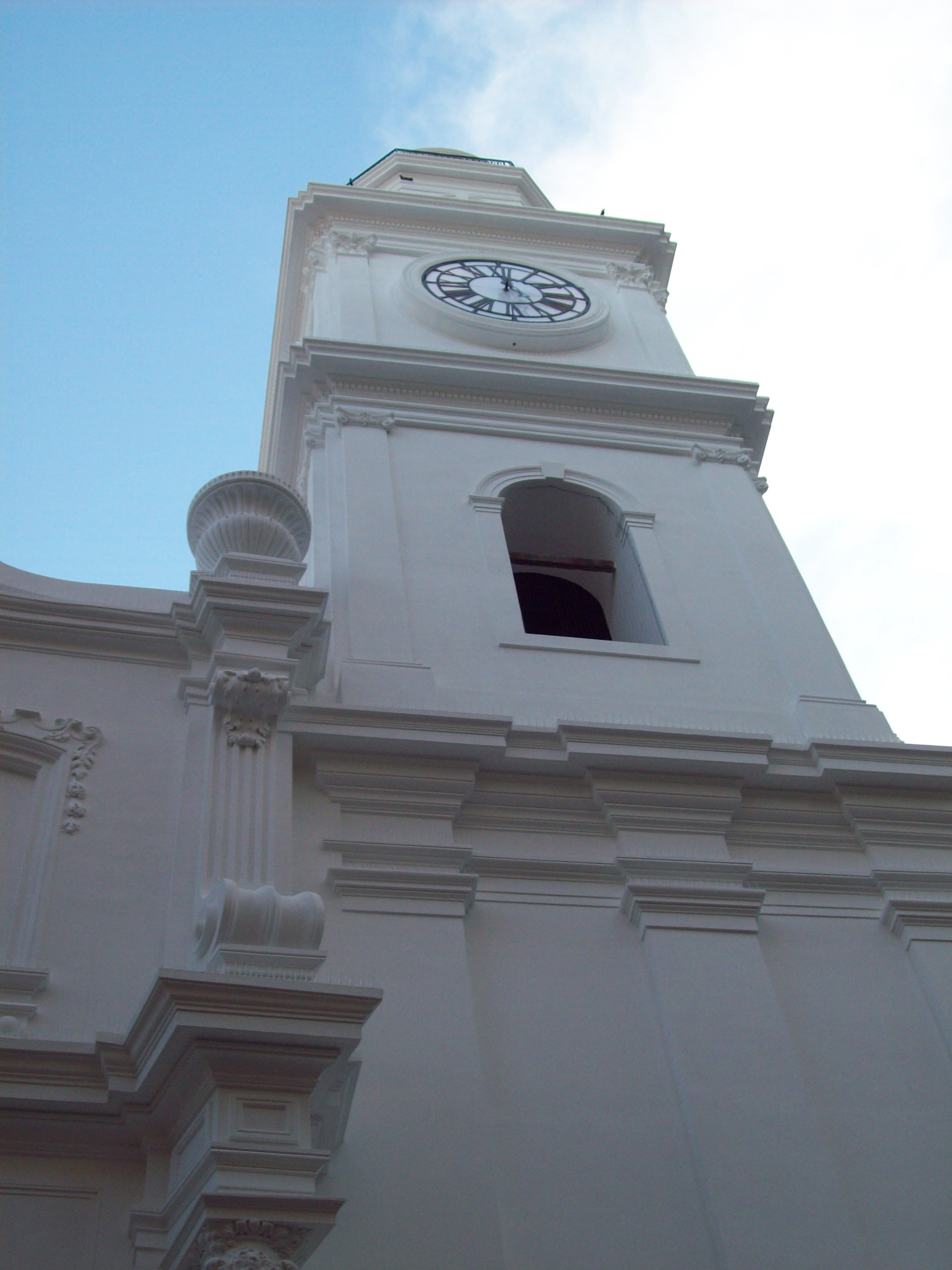

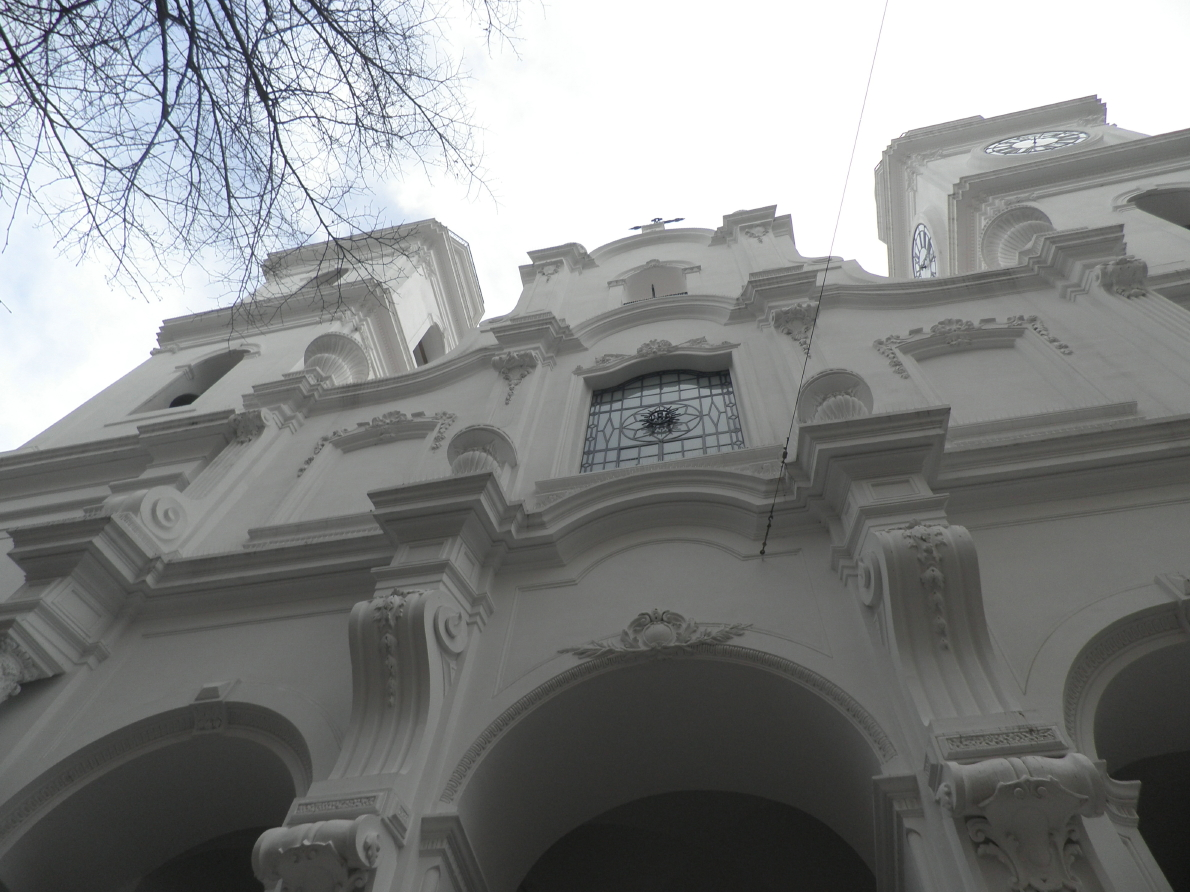

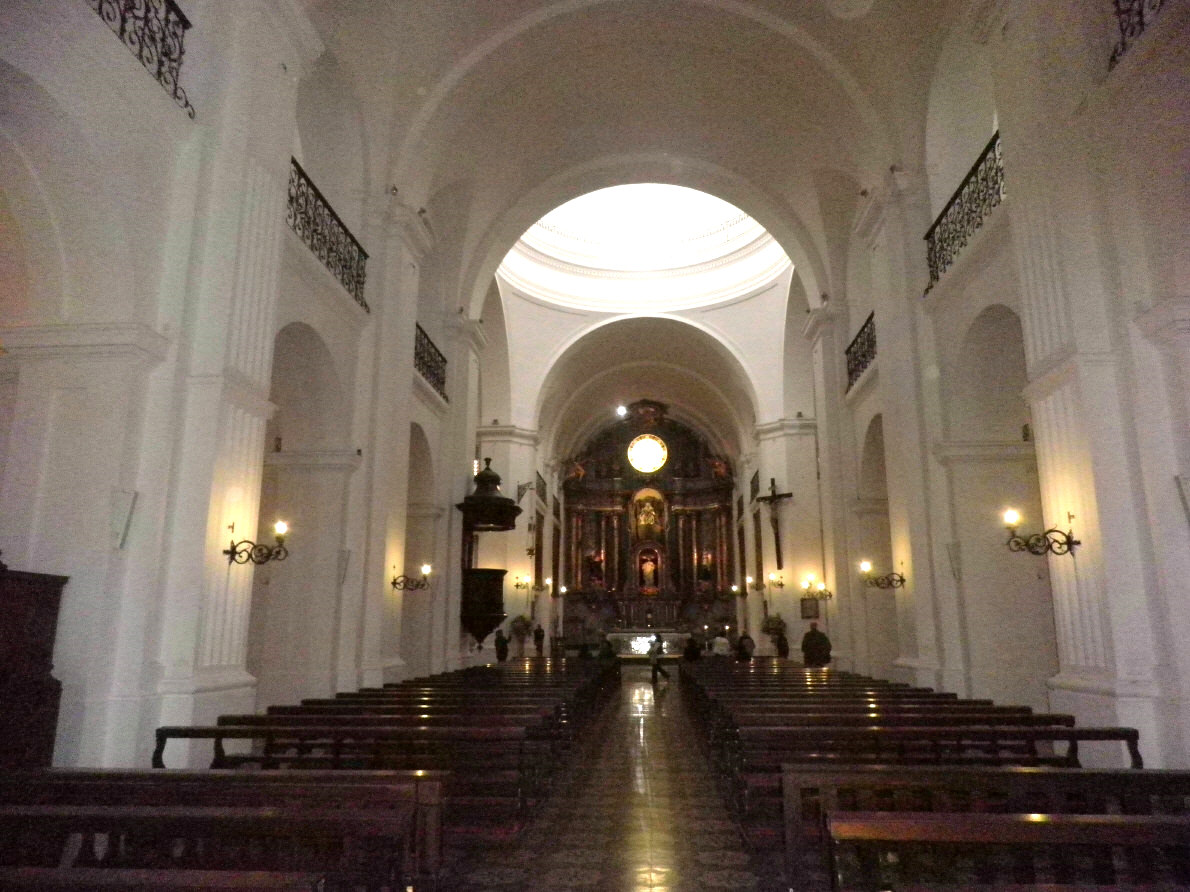

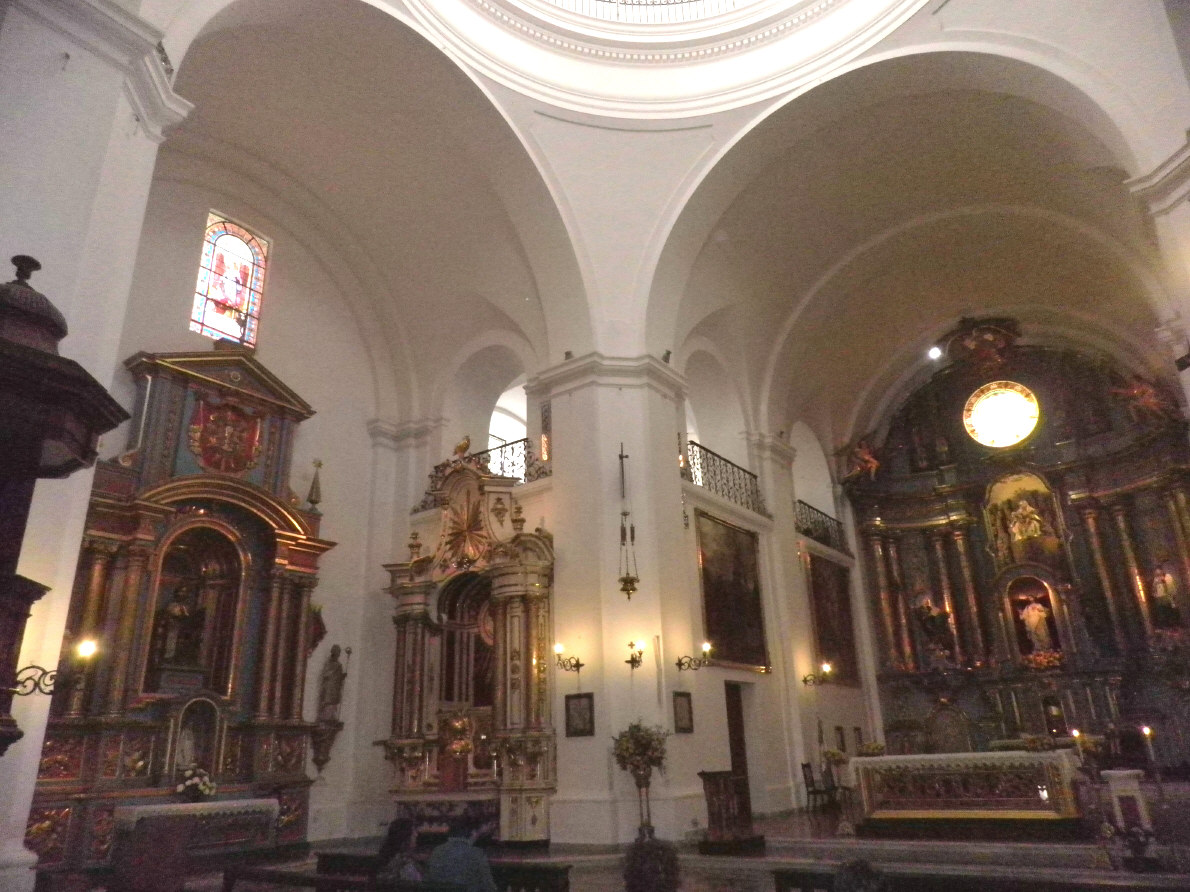

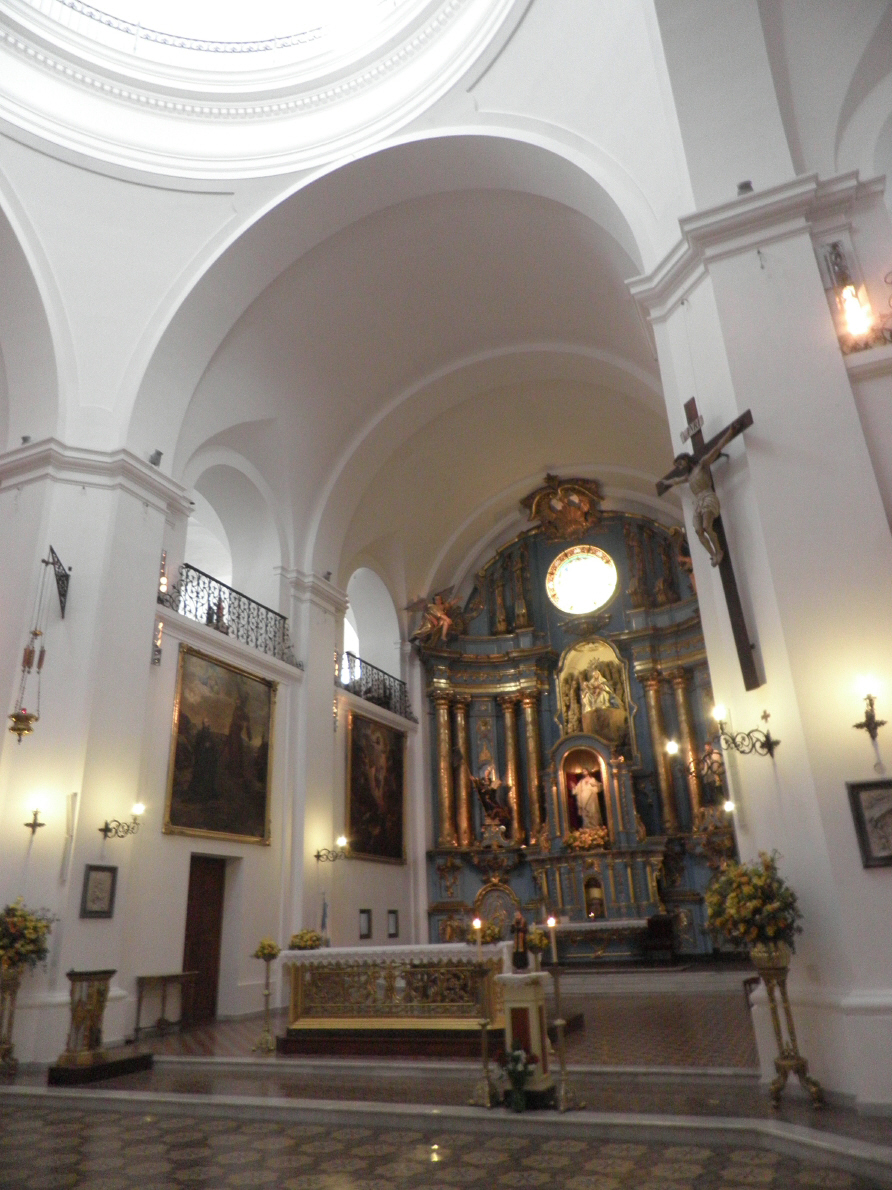

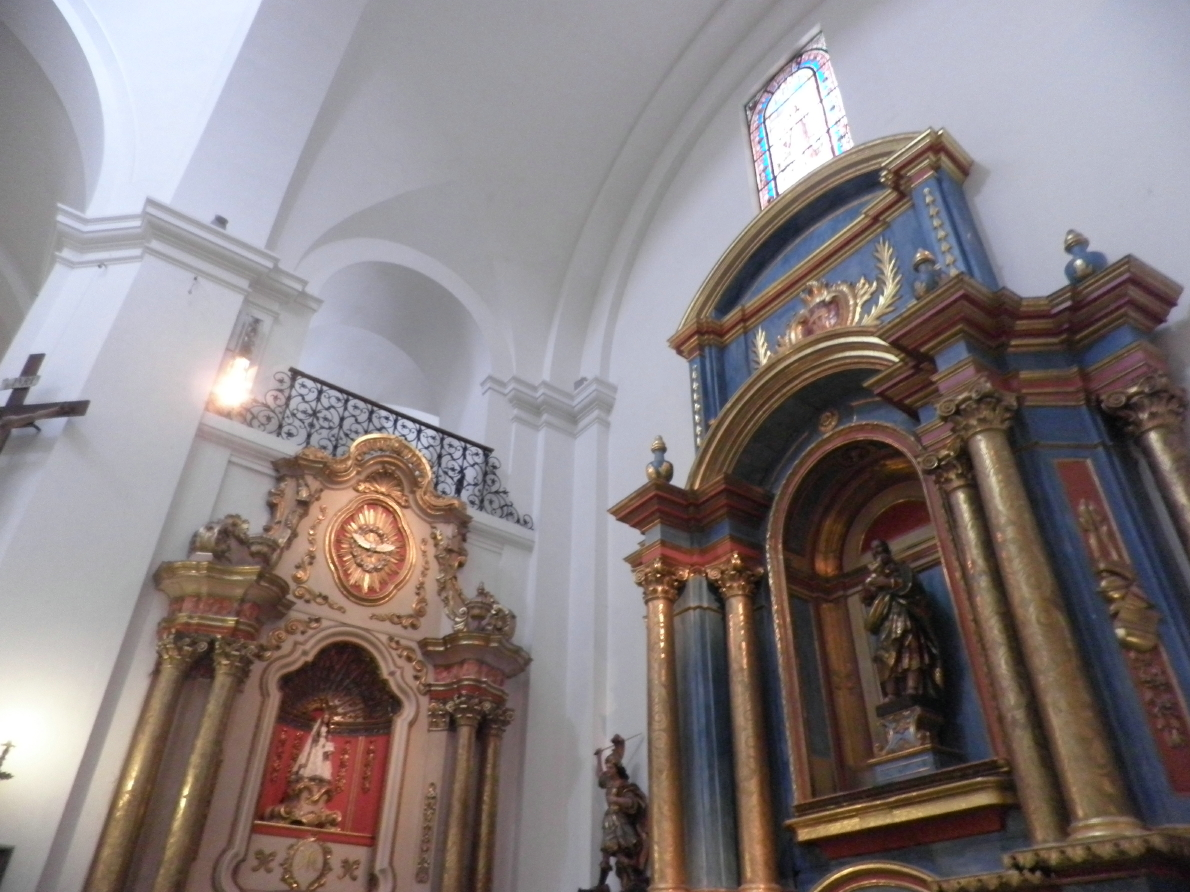

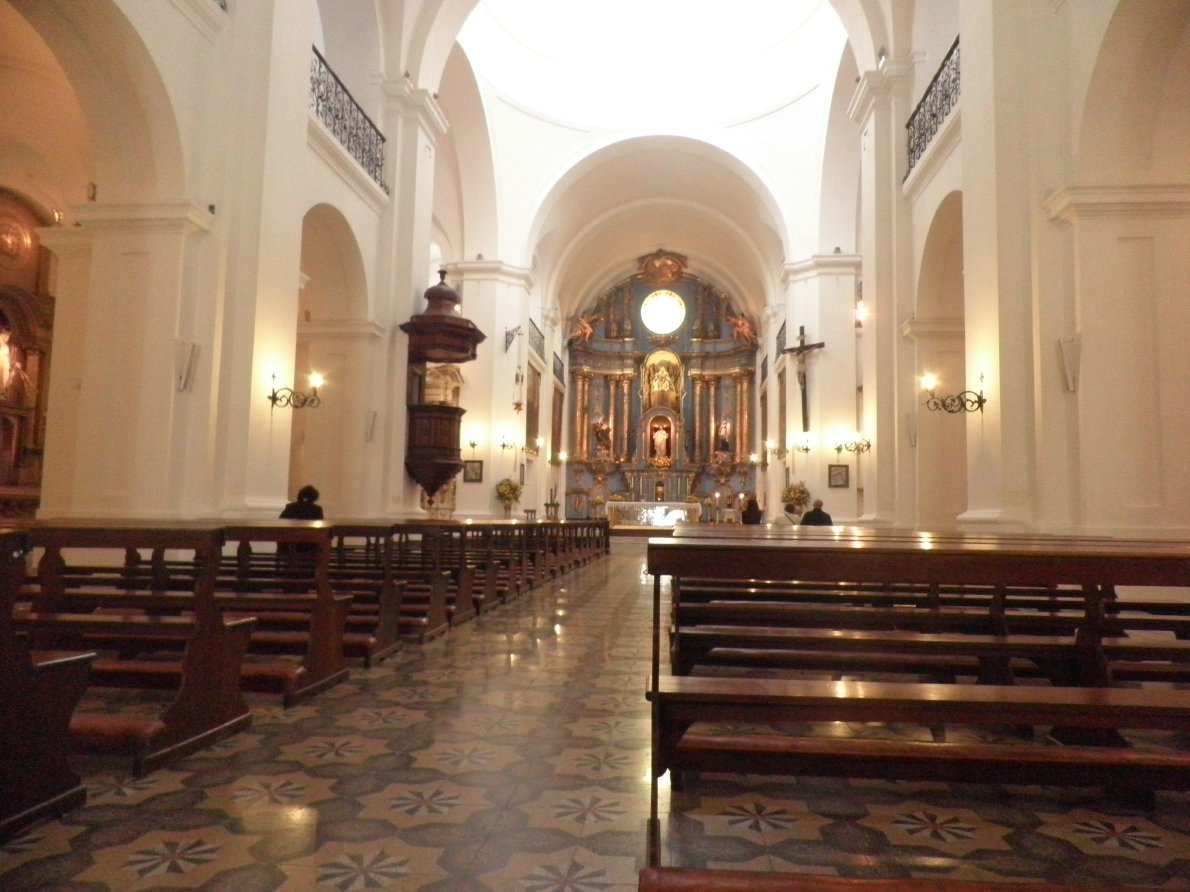

== See also ==
- List of Jesuit sites
- List of tallest structures built before the 20th century
