= Casa de Esteban de Luca =

Coordinates: 34°37′10″S 58°22′16.5″W

House of Esteban de Luca
- Casa de Esteban de Luca (Spanish)
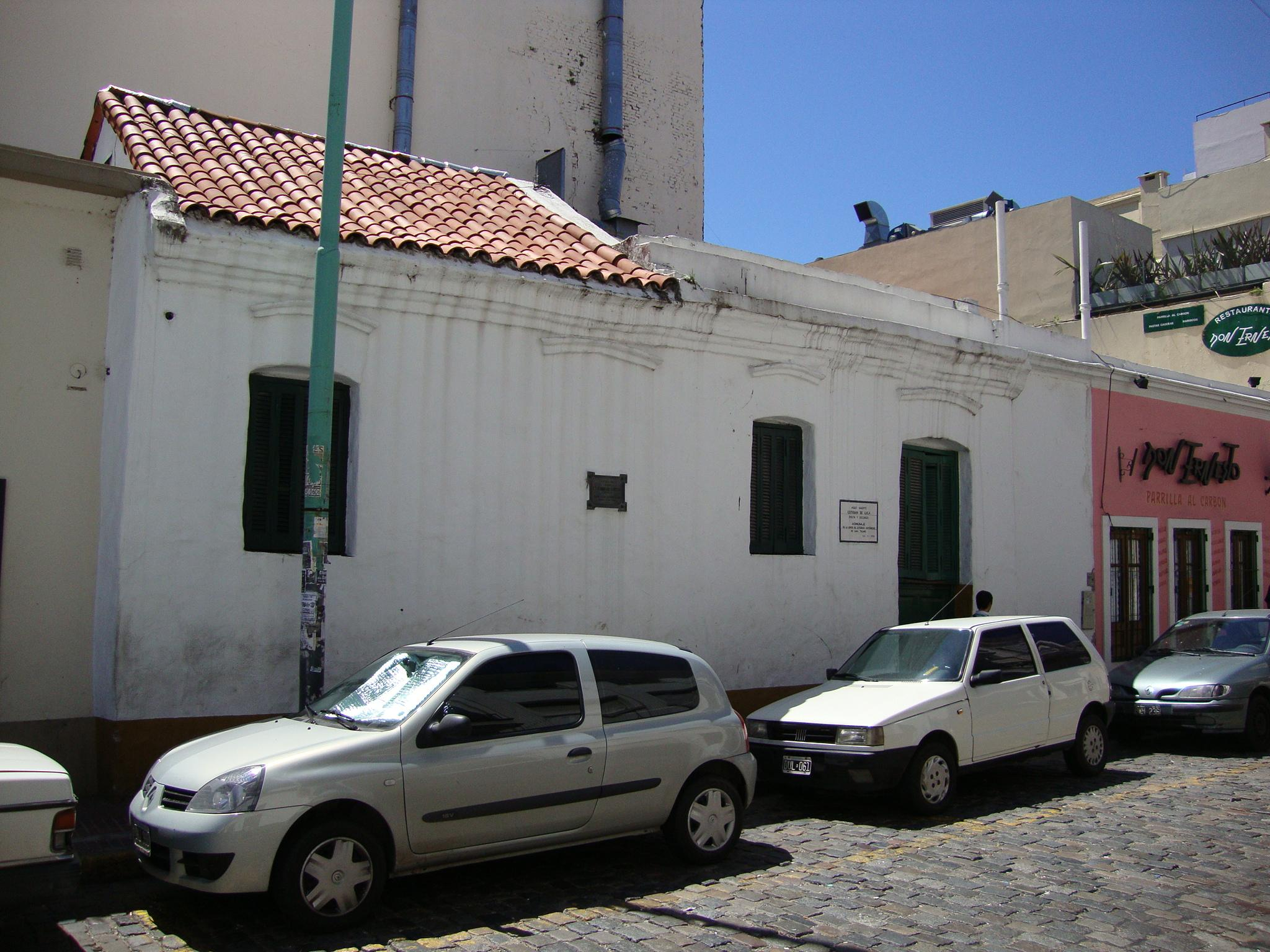
- Interactive map of House of Esteban de Luca
- Location: 383 Carlos Calvo St. Buenos Aires, Argentina

History
- Built: 1786; 240 years ago

Site notes
- Architectural style: Spanish colonial

National Historic Monument of Argentina
- Designated: 1941

The Casa de Esteban de Luca, in Buenos Aires, Argentina, is a historic house, once inhabited by the Argentine poet, soldier, Esteban de Luca, who wrote odes to General José de San Martín, as well to his victories in the battles of Chacabuco, Maipú, and other milestones in the Argentine War of Independence; his Marcha Patriótica was, briefly and until 1813, the unofficial Argentine National Anthem. De Luca was also the director of the National Munitions Works during the war, and lived in this residence until his death in 1824. The house was built in 1786 and declared a National Historic Monument in 1941. It is located at 383 Carlos Calvo Street, and currently houses a restaurant.
