= List of National Historic Monuments of Argentina =

National Historic Monumental of Argentina

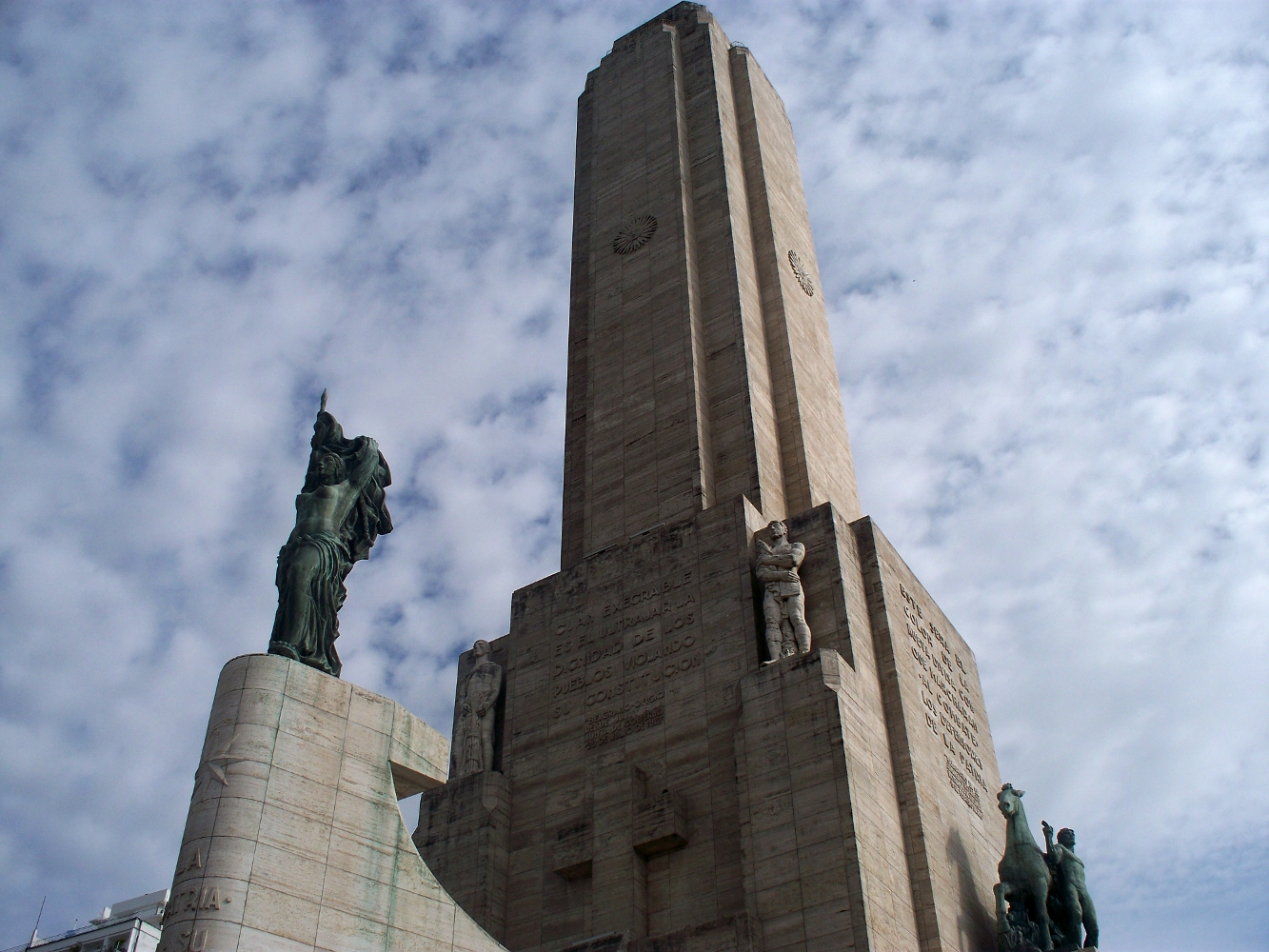
The Flag Memorial, a National Historic Monument in Rosario, Santa Fe

The National Historic Monuments of Argentina are buildings, sites and features in Argentina listed by national decree as historic sites. This designation encourages greater protection under the oversight of the Comisión Nacional de Museos, Monumentos y Lugares Históricos (National Commission of Museums, Monuments and Historic Places), created in 1940. In addition, provinces also have local lists of historic monuments.

There are approximately 400 buildings or sites on the list. Most are buildings or sites from the pre-Hispanic or Colonial periods and some are battlefields and other locations associated with the independence of the country. In recent years the government has been making efforts to include sites on the list that reflect the country's industrial and immigrant heritage.

The Commission has been criticized for not doing enough to preserve the buildings on the list, and only declaring sites as monuments after they have been altered or partly demolished.

== City of Buenos Aires ==
- Bosch Palace (1085/18)
- Café Tortoni (1858/98)
- Casa Rosada (Government House) (1884/98)
- Botanical Garden (1898)
- Cabildo (17th century)
- Cathedral (18th & 19th century)
- Pirámide de Mayo, monument in the Plaza de Mayo (1811)
- Obelisco de Buenos Aires (1936)
- Palace of the National Congress (1906)
- Enclosure of the old National Congress (1864)
- Teatro Colón (1908)
- Our Lady of the Rosary Basilica and Santo Domingo Convent (late 18th century)
- Museo Mitre (18th century)
- Museo Histórico Sarmiento (1860)
- Casa de Esteban de Luca (1786)
- Buenos Aires Central Post Office (1928)
- Retiro (Belgrano) train station (1912)
- Retiro (Mitre) train station (1915)
- San Roque Chapel (late 18th century)
- San Miguel Church (1788)
- San Juan Church (1797)
- San Pedro Telmo Church (1734)
- San Ignacio Church, Manzana de las Luces (1722)
- Former Jesuit buildings, Manzana de las Luces (1730/1780)
- Galerías Pacífico
- Penitenciaría Nacional (Buenos Aires), in former monastic hospital and women's prison
- San Francisco Basilica (1754)
- Barolo Palace (1923)
- San Martín Palace (1909)
- Montserrat Church (1865)
- Former Convent of the Mercedarios (first half 18th century)
- Basilica of Our Lady of Mercy (1779)
- Casa de la Cultura (before 1993 this building housed La Prensa newspaper since its construction in 1898)
- Confitería del Molino (1917)
- Pizzurno Palace (1888)
- Kavanagh Building (1935)
- Palace of Justice (1905–42)
- Puente Transbordador Avellaneda
- Hotel de Inmigrantes (Museum of Immigration) (1906)
- ARA Presidente Sarmiento (1872)
- Corbeta Uruguay (1874)
- Flagship branch the Banco de la Nación Argentina (1938–52)
- Teatro Nacional Cervantes (1921)
- Hospital Borda (1863/1949)
- Seat of the Federación de Asociaciones Católicas de Empleadas (FACE), Calle Sarmiento
- Federal firing range, Avenida del Libertador
- National Music Centre (former National Library)
- Palais de Glace (1911)
- Museum of the Garment Industry
- Barracks, buildings and gardens of the General San Martín Regiment of Mounted Grenadiers, Palermo
- Property known as Los Altos de Elorriaga at Defensa and Alsina, and the house of María Josefa Ezcurra de Ezcurra on Alsina
- Exhibition Area of La Sociedad Rural (1878)
- Naval Observatory of Argentina, Avenida España (1947)
- Embassy of the United Kingdom
- Banco de Londres y América del Sur Headquarters (current seat of the Banco Hipotecario) (1966)
- Naval Station of Buenos Aires, Buenos Aires Port
- Club de Pescadores (Fishing Club and Pier, 1937)
- Argentine Yacht Club (1911)
- Headquarters of the Secular Franciscan Order
- Our Lady of Balvanera
- San José School, at Mitre and Perón
- Museo Histórico Nacional (former home of Gregorio Lezama, inside 'Lezama Park)
- Buenos Aires Customs (1910)
- Buenos Aires Metro stations: on Line A - Plaza de Mayo, Perú, Piedras, Lima, Sáenz Peña, Congreso, Pasco-Alberti and Plaza de Miserere; Line C - San Juan, Independencia, Moreno, Avenida de Mayo, Diagonal Norte, Lavalle and San Martín; Line D - Catedral, 9 de Julio, Tribunales, Facultad de Medicina, Agüero, Bulnes, Scalabrini Ortiz, Plaza Italia, Palermo; Line E - San José, Entre Ríos, Pichincha, Jujuy, Urquiza and Boedo
- President Roque Sáenz Peña Teaching School, Avda. Córdoba
- Ecoparque (1875)
- Palacio de Aguas Corrientes (1894)
- Tornquist Building

== Buenos Aires Province ==
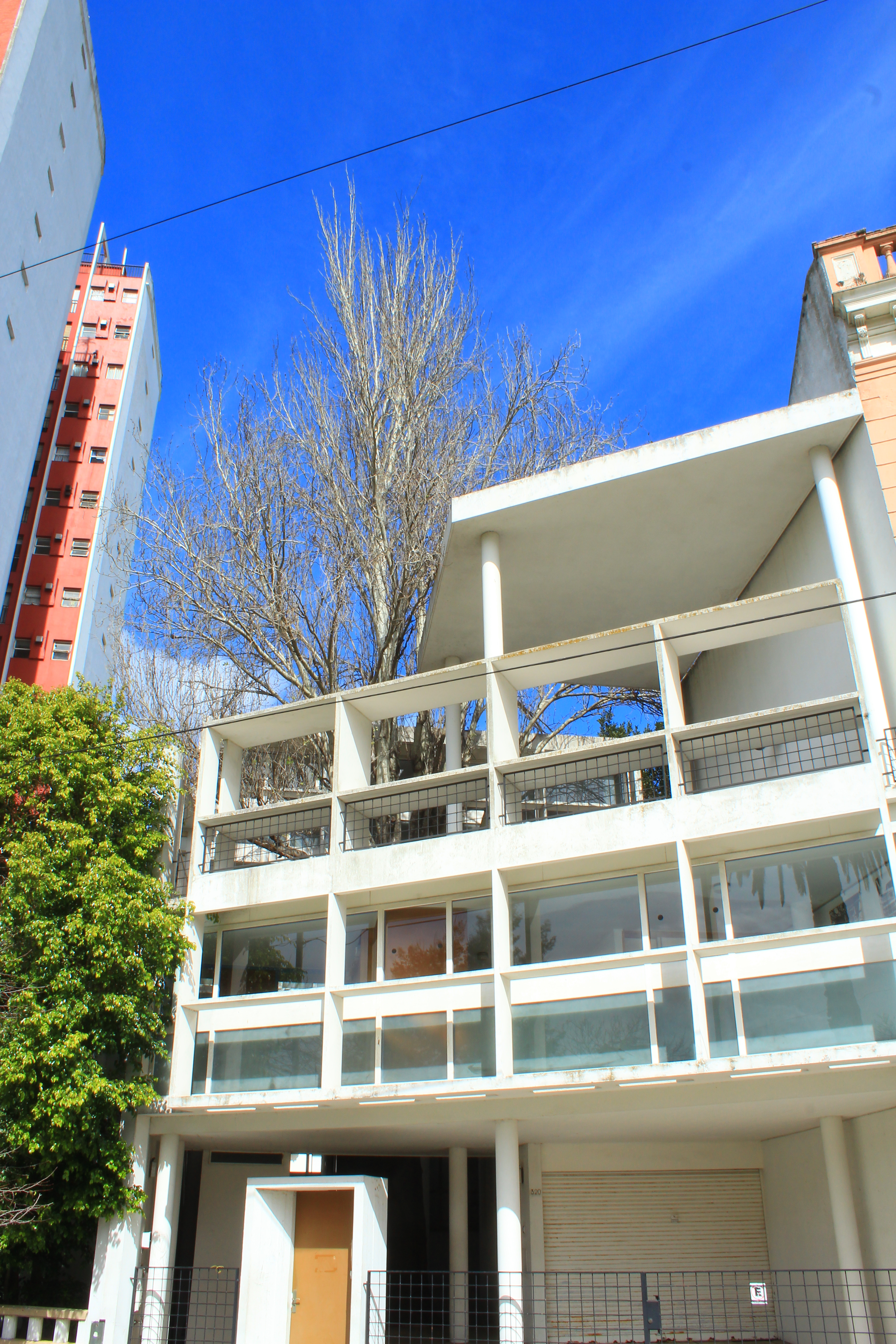
Curutchet House, National and World Heritage Site in La Plata

- Avellaneda Bridge (see also Buenos Aires city)
- Ariston Club, Mar del Plata
- Former building of the Banco de la Provincia de Buenos Aires, Bahía Blanca
- Municipal Palace, Bahía Blanca
- Hotel de Inmigrantes, Bahía Blanca
- Post and Telegraph building, Bahía Blanca
- Tower of old fort, Carmen de Patagones
- Church of Our Lady of Carmen, and tomb of Luis Piedrabuena, Carmen de Patagones
- House of Bernardo Bartuille (now municipal house of culture), Carmen de Patagones
- 'La Carlota' House, Carmen de Patagones
- House of the Rial family, known as Mitre House of Rial Ranch, Carmen de Patagones
- Historic house of the Banco de la Provincia de Buenos Aires, Carmen de Patagones
- House of Andrés García, Carmen de Patagones
- House of Cardinal Juan Cagliero, Carmen de Patagones
- House of Diego Casero, Ciudad Jardin Lomas del Palomar
- Palomar de Casero, Ciudad Jardin Lomas del Palomar
- Mariani-Teruggi House, La Plata
- House of Ricardo Balbín, La Plata
- La Plata Museum
- Curutchet House, La Plata
- Church of Our Lady of Carmen, Lobos
- Municipal Palace, Lobos
- Social club (formerly seat of Sociedad Orfeon Lobense), Lobos
- Cathedral (Basilica Our Lady of Peace) and Parish house, Lomas de Zamora
- Municipal House, Lomas de Zamorra
- School No. 1 'Bartolome Mitre', Lomas de Zamorra
- Basilica of Our Lady of Luján
- Enrique Unzue Saturnine Institute, Mar del Plata
- Our Lady of Pilar church, Pilar
- House of Juan Manuel de Rosas, San Andrés
- Old Bridge, San Antonio de Areco
- Parque Criollo and Ricardo Güiraldes Gaucho Museum, San Antonio de Areco
- Pulpería 'La Blanqueada', San Antonio de Areco
- Church of San Antonio de Padua, San Antonio de Areco
- House of the municipal mayoralty, San Antonio de Areco
- Estancia 'La Porteña', San Antonio de Areco
- Quinta Pueyrredón, San Isidro
- Villa Ocampo, San Isidro (1890)
- Church of the Holy Sacrament, Tandil
- House of Domingo Sarmiento, Tigre
- Tigre Club

== Catamarca Province ==
- Basílica Nuestra Señora del Valle, San Fernando del Valle de Catamarca
- Church at Hualfín
- Church of the Lord of Miracles, La Tercena
- San José church, Piedra Blanca
- Birthplace of Friar Mamerto Esquiú, Piedra Blanca
- Chapel of Our Lady of the Rosary nr San José (1715)
- Church of San Pedro, Fiambalá (1770)
- Ruins of religious buildings, Icaño
- Remains of Pucara de Aconquija, Ambato Department
- Inca settlement at Shincal de Quimivil, Belén Department
- Pre-Hispanic settlement of Watungasta, Tinogasta Department

== Chaco Province ==
- Former government house (Carlos Chiesanova Police Museum), Resistencia 27.4502°S 58.9895°W
- Former Francés Railway Station (Natural History Museum), Resistencia 27.4461°S 58.9773°W

== Chubut Province ==
- La Trochita, Esquel (1922–45)
- Remains of Fort San José de la Candelaria, Gulf of San José
- National Primary School No. 17 'Vicente Calderón', El Blanco, Cholila

== Córdoba Province ==
- Building of the Banco de la Provincia de Córdoba, Córdoba
- Provincial legislature, Córdoba
- Córdoba Cabildo (17th century)

The building of Jose de Leo Carnedo from the 17th century.

== Corrientes Province ==
- Government House, Corrientes
- Holy Cross of Miracles Church, Corrientes (1887)
- Church of Santa Ana of the Guácara Indians, Santa Ana (1765)
- Sanctuary of Santa Lucía
- Estación del Este (railway station) museum, Monte Caseros (1875)

== Entre Ríos Province ==
- Cathedral of Paraná
- Nuestra Señora del Huerto school assembly hall (former seat of Argentine Senate), Paraná
- Palacio San José, near Concepción del Uruguay
- Former Customs House, Concepción del Uruguay
- Biblioteca Popular del Paraná

== Formosa Province ==
- Government House, Formosa
- House of governor Ignacio Fotheringham (now 'Juan Pablo Douffard' provincial historic museum), Formosa (1887)

== Jujuy Province ==
- Cathedral of San Salvador de Jujuy
- Government House, San Salvador de Jujuy
- Cabildo (now Museum of Police History) of San Salvador de Jujuy
- Santa Barbara church, San Salvador de Jujuy
- San Francisco Chapel, Tilcara
- Santa Rosa Church, Purmamarca
- San Francisco Church, Uquía

== La Pampa Province ==
- El Castillo House in Parhaha Luro, Toay Department
- El mate gigante en la Avenida Circunvalación en Santa Rosa
- Monumento a JFK en la Ruta Provincial nº 1 en Quemú-Quemú
- Monumento a Domingo y Eva Perón en la Avenida Circunvalación de General Pico

== La Rioja Province ==
- The Padercitas, Cochangasta (a small granite temple) (1927)
- Temple and Convent of Santo Domingo, La Rioja

== Mendoza Province ==
- Basilica of San Francisco, Mendoza (1875/93)
- Vaults of Uspallata, Las Heras Department (late 18th Century)
- Chapel and Oratory of Alto Salvador, San Martín Department (1852)
- Land, historic willow tree and chapel of the Plumerillo (Old Oratory of the Segura), Las Heras (1870)
- The Rosario de Las Lagunas Chapel, Lavalle Department (1864)
- Nuestra Señora del Rosario Chapel, Barrancas, Mendoza (late 18th Century)
- House of former Governor Francisco Civit, Mendoza (1873)
- House of Juan de la Cruz Videla, Cruz de Piedra, Maipú Department
- National School Agustín Álvarez, Mendoza (1905)
- La Virgen de la Carrodilla church, Luján de Cuyo Department (original 1840, rebuilt 1946)
- Three Casas del Rey or hovels of Uspallata (refuges for messengers), Las Cuevas Department (1765/70)
- Ruins of the Malal Hue Fort (1846) and the Rufino Ortega Historic Mill (1885), Malargüe
- Ruins of San Rafael del Diamante Fort, Villa 25 de Mayo, San Rafael Department (1805)
- Ruins of the Jesuit church of San Francisco, Mendoza (1716/31)
- Water point and stone bridge de los Españoles, Luján de Cuyo (1788–91)
- Former Bodega Arizu, Godoy Cruz (1888–1910)
- Former Bodega Arizu, Villa Atuel, San Rafael
- Panquehua Bodega and vineyards, Las Heras (1827–1918), plus contents
- Giol and Gargantini workers' and supervisors' huts, Maipú (1910)
- Site of the Estancia de los Molina, General Ortega district, Maipú
- Hydraulic mill at Upsallata Estancia, Las Heras
- Farm of General San Martín, San Martín Department (1823)
- The property of General San Martín and Seat of the public library "General San Martín" (1815/17)
- Site of the birthplace of Mercedes San Martín y Escalada, Mendoza (1815/17)
- Mill of Miller Tejeda (1815–16)
- Ruins of San Carlos Fort, San Carlos Department (1770)
- Colonial bridge over the Picheuta River (late 18th Century)
- Pedro del Castillo Square, the old Plaza Mayor of Mendoza (1561) and site of the old Cabildo of Mendoza (1561–1861)
- Training ground of the Ejército de los Andes, Mendoza (1814/17)
- Historic block of Tunuyán (1823)
- Site of the Posta de Rodeo del Medio, Fray Luis Beltrán, Maipú (18th Century)
- Mountain pass of la Cumbre (1817)
- Cristo Redentor de Los Andes, Las Heras

Battlefields

- Site of the Battle of Potrerillos, Luján de Cuyo (1817)
- Site of the Battle of Rodeo del Medio, Maipú (1841)
- Site of the Battles of Santa Rosa (1874)

Tombs

- Tomb of General Gerónimo Espejo (1801–89) at the Gral. Espejo Military School
- Tomb of Colonel Antonio de Berutti, Ruins of San Francisco (1772–1841)
- Tomb of José Vicente Zapata, Mendoza Cemetery (1851–1897)
- Tomb of Juan Gualberto Godoy, Mendoza Cemetery (1793–1864)
- Tomb of Tomás Godoy Cruz, San Vicente Ferrer church, Godoy Cruz (1791–1852)
- Tomb of Tte. General Rufino Ortega, Maipú (1847–1917)

== Misiones Province ==
- Government House, Posadas

== Río Negro Province ==
- Civic complex, San Carlos de Bariloche

== Salta Province ==
- Arias Rengel House, Salta
- Salta Cathedral, and Pantheon of the Glories of the North with tomb of Martín Güemes
- Monument to Martín Güemes, Salta
- Cabildo of Salta, housing Historical Museum of the North
- San Francisco church, Salta
- San Bernardo convent, Salta
- House of Hernández City Museum, Salta
- Finca La Cruz and house of Martín Güemes
- San José church, Cachi
- Potrero de Payogasta, Cachi
- Pre-Hispanic settlement of Santa Rosa de Tastil, Rosario de Lerma Department

== San Juan Province ==
- Birthplace of Domingo Sarmiento, San Juan
- Church and Convent of Santo Domingo, San Juan
- Temple of San José de Jáchal, San José de Jáchal
- Achango Chapel, Las Flores
- Mills of Sardiña in Tamberías (1880); Alto o García (1876) in San Isidro; Huaco (1790, 1870); Escobar or Iglesia in Villa Iglesia; Bella Vista in Villa Iglesia

== San Luis Province ==
- Our Lady of the Rosary church, Villa de Merlo
- House of Domingo Sarmiento, San Francisco del Monte de Oro
- Church of San José del Morro

== Santa Cruz Province ==
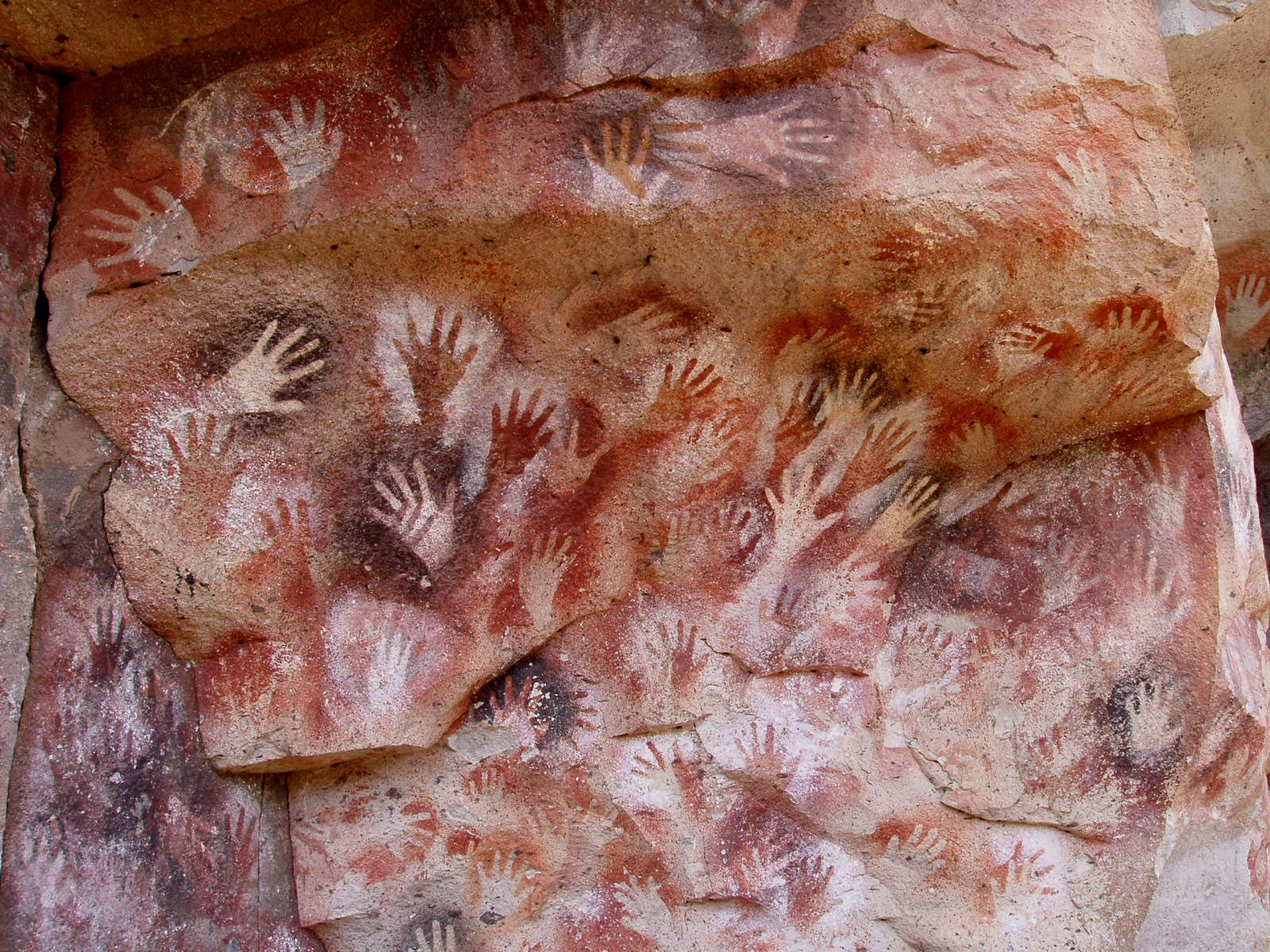
Cueva de las Manos in Santa Cruz, Argentina.

- Prehistoric rock art/cave site, Cueva de las Manos

== Santa Fe Province ==
- National Flag Memorial, Rosario
- Villa Hortensia, Rosario
- Central Post Office (Palacio de Correos), Rosario
- Former Palace of Justice (now housing the UNR Faculty of Law), Rosario
- Normal School No. 2, Rosario
- Santa Fe la Vieja
- Diez de Andino House (now Provincial Historical Museum), Santa Fe
- Brener Synagogue, Moisés Ville

== Santiago del Estero Province ==
- Bridge across Río Dulce between Santiago del Estero and La Banda
- Santiago del Estero Cathedral
- Home and museum of Andrés Chazarreta, Santiago del Estero
- Sanctuary of Our Lord of Miracles of Mailín, nr Lugones

== Tierra del Fuego Province, Argentine Antarctica and South Atlantic Islands ==
- Aguirre Bay (Gardiner Caves)
- Buen Suceso Bay
- Harberton Station, Isla Grande de Tierra del Fuego
- Pavilion of the raising of the national flag by the Lasserre Expedition
- Capilla Nuestra Señora de la Candelaria Misión Salesiana, Río Grande
- Snow Hill Cabin (Colina Nevada) used by Otto Nordenskiöld's Swedish Antarctic Expedition
- Former CAP cold storage plant, Río Grande
- Cemetery of the Salesian Mission, Río Grande
- Monumento Islas Malvinas, Ushuaia
- Parish church of Ushuaia
- Former Government House of the Territory, current provincial legislature, Ushuaia
- Rosas House, Isla Grande de Tierra del Fuego
- Año Nuevo lighthouse, Isla Observatorio
- Caleta Falsa at the foot of Monte Bilbao

== Tucumán Province ==
- House of Tucumán
- Tucumán Cathedral
- Provincial Historical Museum, Tucumán (former house of the Avellaneda)
- Church of San Francisco, Tucumán
- House of José Colombres, Tucumán (Museum of Sugar Industry)
- Jesuit Estancia of La Banda, Tafí del Valle

== National Historic Places ==
In addition to the National Historic Monuments, a number of places have been designated 'National Historic Places' (Lugares Históricos Nacionales), including:

- Plaza Dorrego, San Telmo, Buenos Aires
- Plaza de Mayo, Buenos Aires
- Avenida de Mayo, Buenos Aires
- Plaza de los Dos Congresos, Buenos Aires
- House of Carlos Gardel, Abasto, Buenos Aires
- House of Dr Bernardo Houssay, Buenos Aires
- Carabassa House, Buenos Aires
- Buildings of Austria Street, Buenos Aires
- Plaza Rodríguez Peña, Buenos Aires
- Garden of the Teachers Plaza, Buenos Aires
- Plazoleta Petronila Rodrígiez, Buenos Aires
- Plaza Rivadavia, Bahía Blanca, Buenos Aires Province
- Cerro de la Caballada, Carmen de Patagones, Buenos Aires Province
- Site of original fort and Plaza de Armas, Carmen de Patagones, Buenos Aires Province
- Site of the birthplace of Luis Pedrabuena, Carmen de Patagones, Buenos Aires Province
- Site of the family house of Ambrosio Mitre, Carmen de Patagones, Buenos Aires Province
- Site of the family house of Martín Rivadavia, Carmen de Patagones, Buenos Aires Province
- Capilla de los negros, Chascomús, Buenos Aires Province
- Ciudad Evita, La Matanza Partido, Buenos Aires Province
- Calle Nueva York, port of La Plata, Buenos Aires Province
- Plaza 1810, Lobos, Buenos Aires Province
- Plaza Victorio Grigera, Lomas de Zamora
- Childhood home of Juan Perón, Roque Pérez, Buenos Aires Province
- Pre-Hispanic settlement of Rincón Chico, Santa María Department, Catamarca Province
- Puerto Bermejo, Chaco Province
- Ruins of the city of Concepción de Buena Esperanza, Chaco Province
- Site of monument to Cacique Casimiro Biguá, Tehuelches Department, Chubut Province
- Monolith and site of fort, Junín de los Andes, Neuquén Province
- Battlefield of Chimehuín, Neuquén Province
- Remains of cave paintings, Las Juntas, Guachipas, Salta Province
- San Juan de Salvamento Port, Isla de los Estados, Tierra del Fuego Province
- Former base of the Anglican mission, Ushuaia, Tierra del Fuego Province
- El Paramo, Paramo Peninsula, Tierra del Fuego Province
- 9 de Julio Park, Tucumán, Tucumán Province

== See also ==
- Category:World Heritage Sites in Argentina
- National Parks of Argentina
