= Faculty of Law, National University of Rosario =

Coordinates: 32°56′38″S 60°39′04″W

Faculty of Law (NUR)
- Facultad de Derecho (UNR)
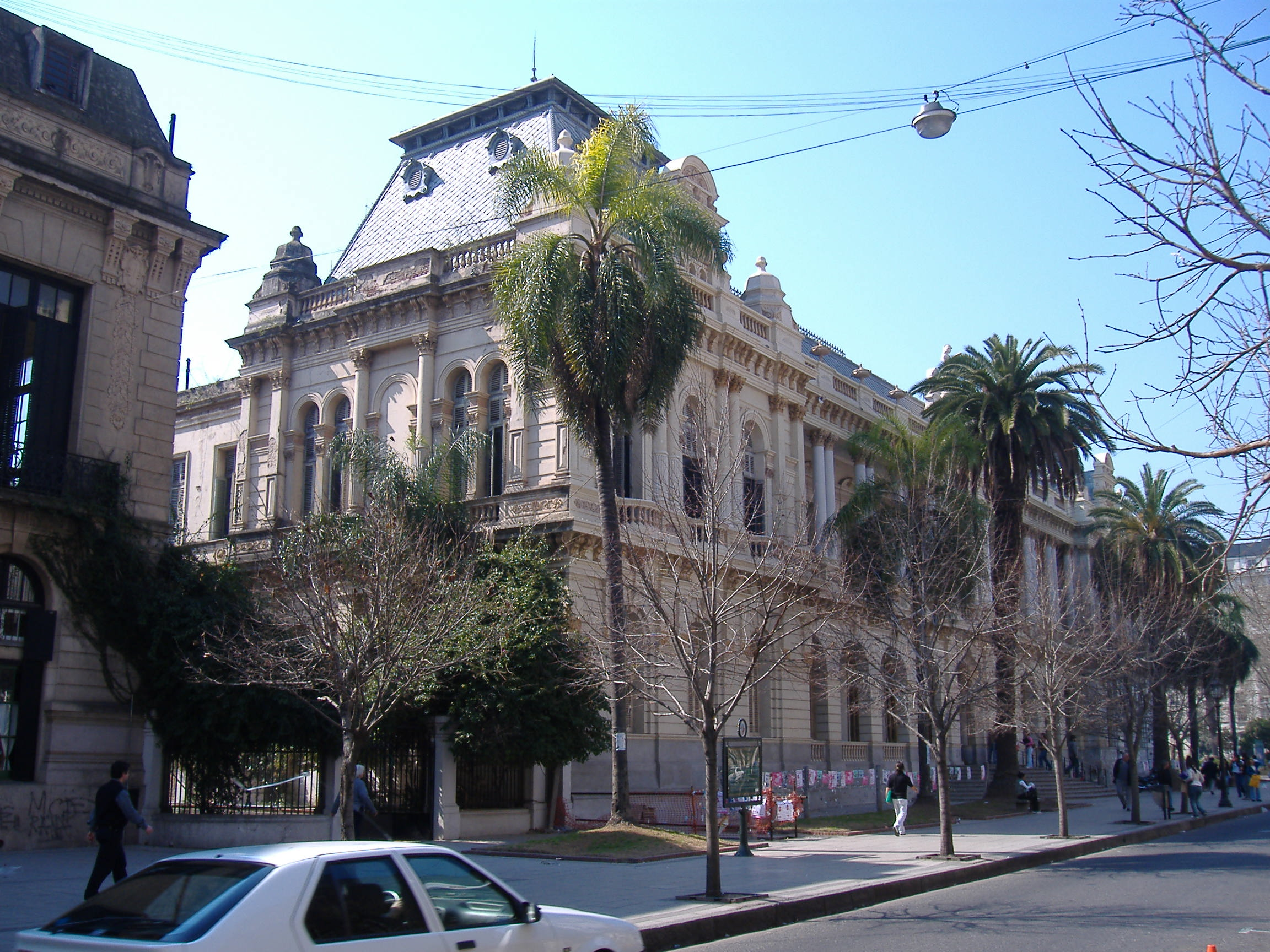
- The former Palace of Justice, seat of FDer
- Type: Law School
- Established: 1959; 67 years ago
- Parent institution: National University of Rosario
- Dean: Hernán Botta
- Website: fder.unr.edu.ar

The Faculty of Law (Spanish: Facultad de Derecho, abbrevriated FDer) is the Law school of the National University of Rosario (Argentina), and is located in the former Palace of Justice Building, a Rosario landmark and a National Historic Monument.

== History ==
=== The law school ===
On June 27, 1959, an institution for the teaching of law was created in Rosario, as a result of the demands made by the law students from Rosario who had to travel daily to Santa Fe, located 170 km to the north, in order to attend classes. This institution was part of the National University of the Littoral, which is based in the city of Santa Fe.

On February 15, 1967, Resolution Nº 75 was passed by Dr. Carlos María Gelly y Obes, the national Education Minister, by which the "institution for the teaching of law" became the Law School. Nevertheless, it was still part of Santa Fe's National University of the Littoral.

The Universidad Nacional de Rosario (UNR) was created by law N° 17.987, passed on November 29, 1968, and began operating on December 16 of the same year. Shortly after, on March 15, 1969, the National Government passed decree N° 1528, creating the School of Law and Political Sciences of Rosario and incorporating it into the Universidad Nacional de Rosario (UNR) instead of Santa Fe's Universidad Nacional del Litoral.

Students of political sciences and of law attended classes together until 1974, when the students of political sciences were given their own building. Since then, the law school has been called the Law School of Rosario.

== Programs ==
The law program is divided into an introductory course of three months, a basic cycle of 1 year, and the advanced cycle, which is the backbone of the program and takes around 5 years to complete. After passing all of the different stages, the student becomes a lawyer. (In Argentina, there is no need to be further examined by a bar association, as in other countries.)

The School of Law also offers post-graduate courses for other degrees and certifications, such as Notary public, Doctorate in Law, and several specific Master's degrees.

== See also ==
- Palace of Justice (Rosario)
