= Hualfín =

Coordinates: 27°14′S 66°50′W

- Municipality and village
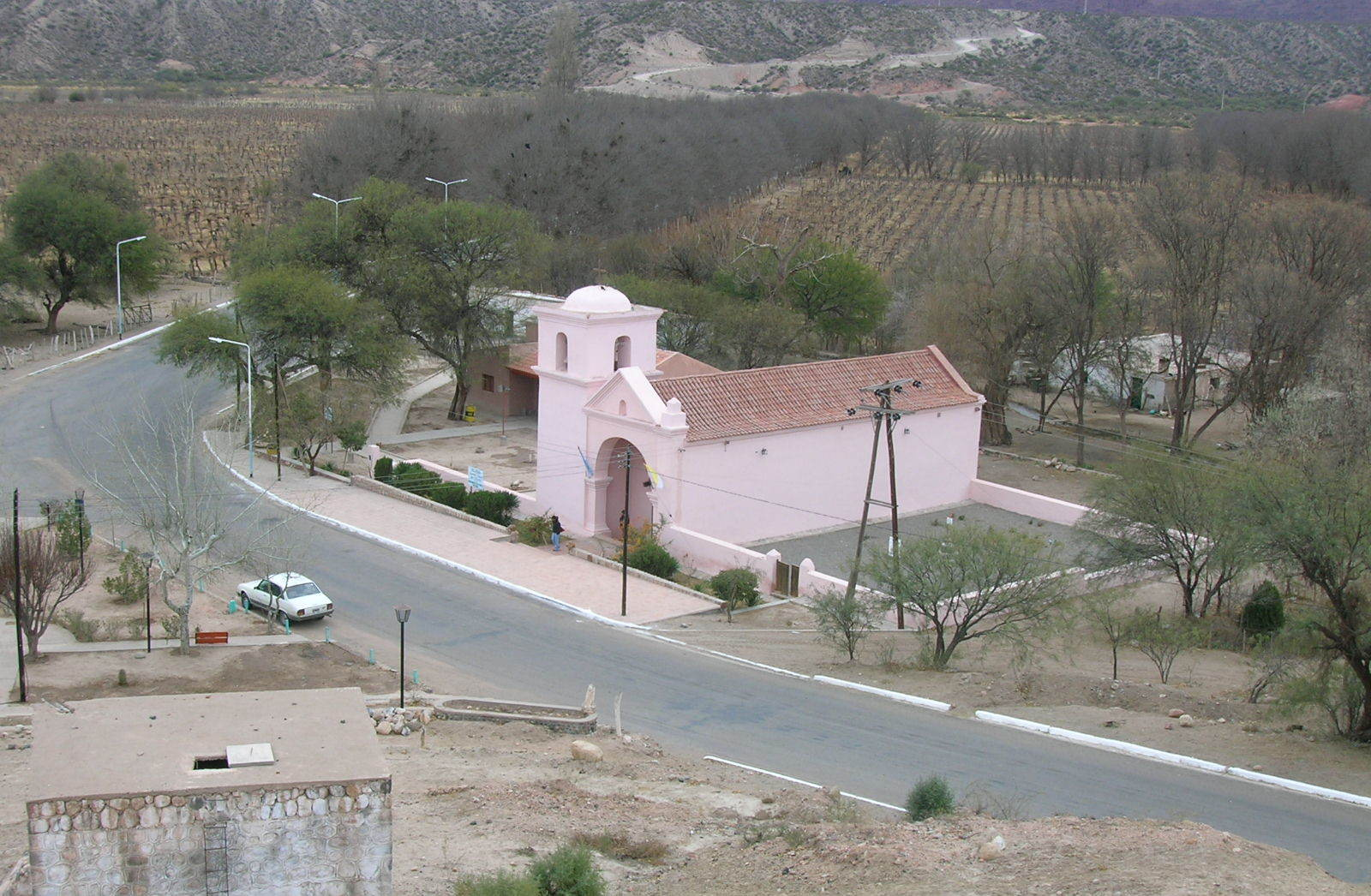
- Hualfín
- Interactive map of Hualfín
- Country: Argentina
- Province: Catamarca Province
- Time zone: UTC−3 (ART)

Hualfín is a village and municipality in Catamarca Province in northwestern Argentina.
