= Vavasseur mounting =

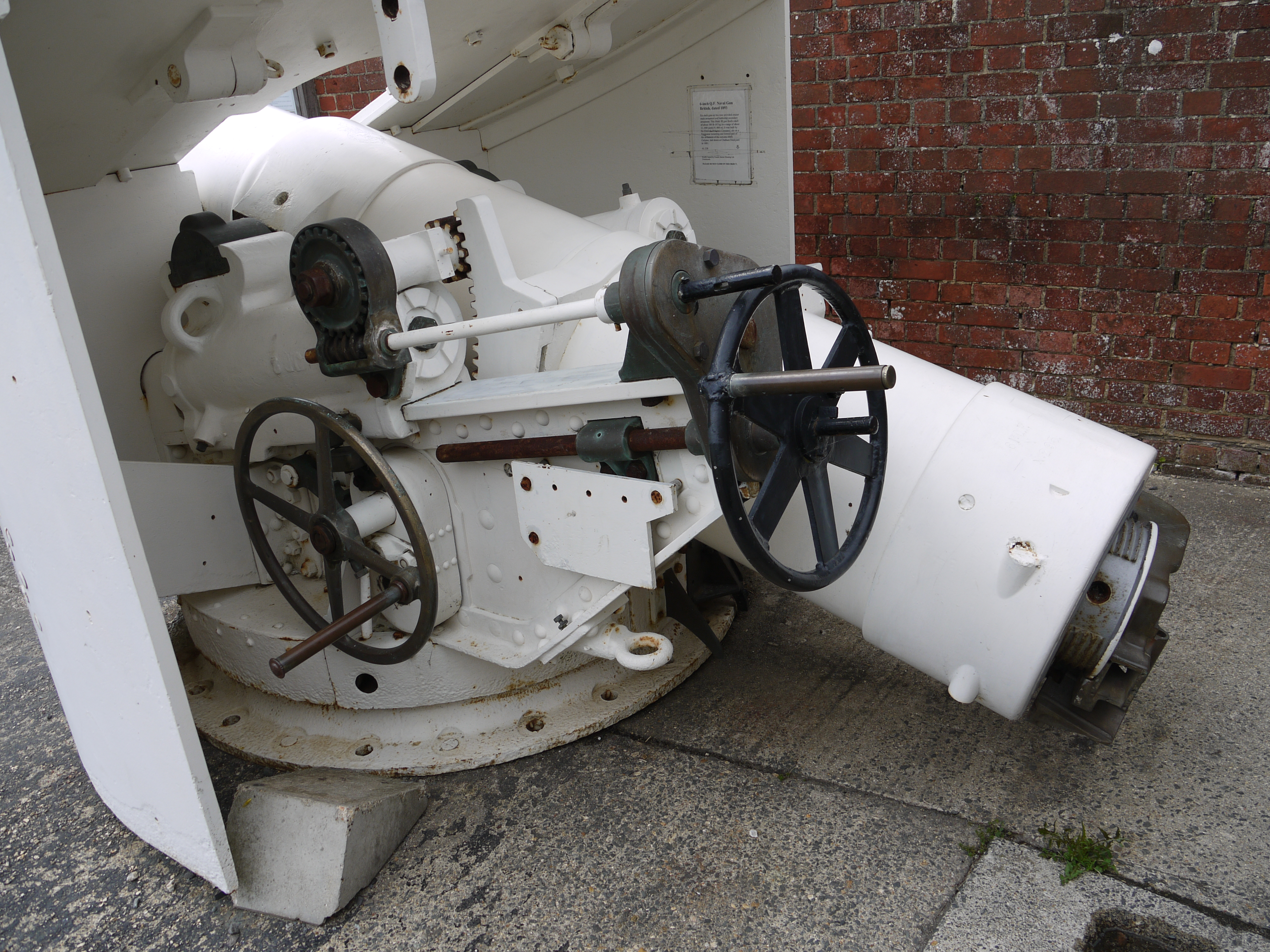
Rear of a QF 6 inch Mk III naval gun on Vavasseur recoil mounting, Royal Armouries, Fort Nelson

Vavasseur mountings were several mounting devices for artillery and machine guns. They were invented and patented by Josiah Vavasseur.

The mountings were used in Barton's Point Battery in Sheerness, on the Isle of Sheppey, in Kent, England.

Vavasseur pivot mountings were also used in naval artillery mounted on ships in the late 19th century.
