= Asociación Madres Víctimas de Trata =

Argentine non-profit organization

Asociación Madres Víctimas de Trata (lit. 'Association of Mothers of Victims of Trafficking') is an Argentine non-profit organization formed by a group of mothers of girls who disappeared to be prostituted. It is a group of Argentine mothers whose daughters were captured and kidnapped by sexual exploitation networks.

The association's goal is to end trafficking in Argentina and to fight for the abolition of prostitution.

The mothers dress in red and make rounds one Wednesday a month in the Plaza de Mayo asking for the appearance of their daughters and for the state to take responsibility. In 1991, the mothers began seeking to meet with other women who are in the same search for their missing daughters to fight together against sexual exploitation and trafficking of women, and to be able to think together about what actions to take to find and recover their daughters. In 2015, they formed a self-managed NGO.

Its founder, Margarita Meira, received the 2018 International La Donna dell'Anno Award (Woman of the Year Award) in Italy for her work against the sexual exploitation of girls and women. Her book, Margarita y la anaconda, is an autobiographical account of that struggle.

The organization is in charge of reporting missing girls and complaining to the State, providing legal support and emotional support to families and helping rescued women and girls.

The organization has managed to rescue dozens of girls kidnapped against their will from brothels in Argentina.
