= 2001 Massacre of Plaza de Mayo =

2001 massacre in Argentina

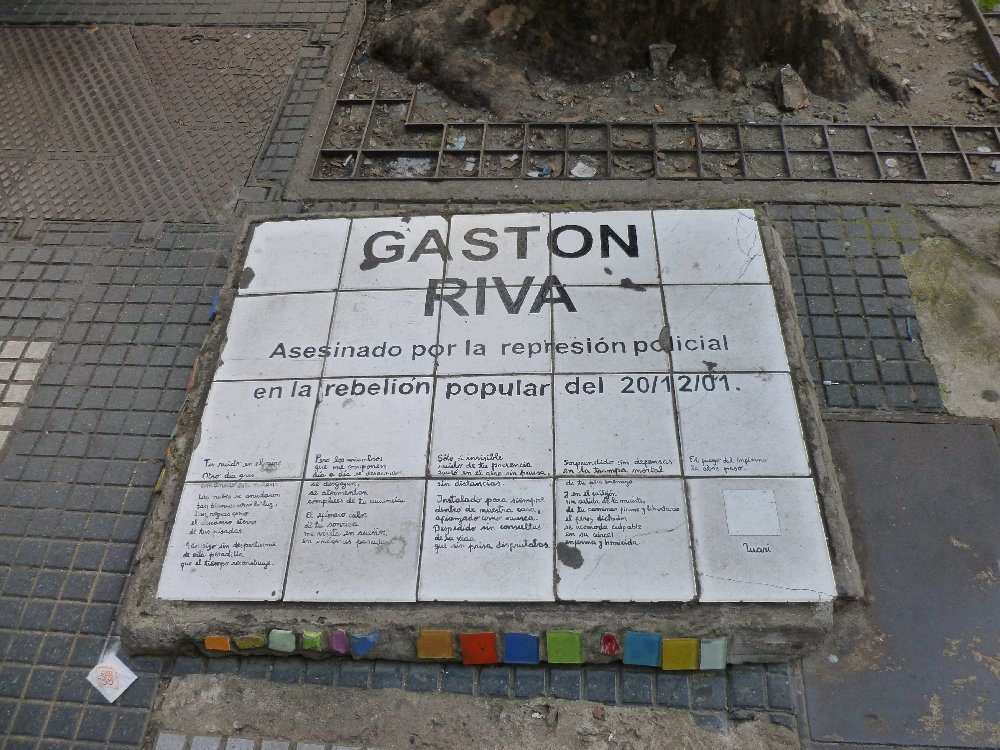

The 2001 Massacre of Plaza de Mayo was a slaughter of people at Plaza de Mayo (May Square), Buenos Aires, Argentina, and around this area that took place on December 20, 2001. Five people were murdered. The names of the fatal victims were Carlos Almiron, Gustavo Ariel Benedetto, Diego Lamagna, Alberto Marquez and Gaston Marcelo Riva. The perpetrators tried to kill four more people (Marcelo Dorado, Martin Galli, Sergio Ruben Sanchez, and Paula Simonetti), but they did not succeed. A total of 277 injuries was reported. These crimes were committed under Fernando de la Rua’s presidential term in which Argentina was suffering one of its deepest crises and people were rioting in different cities around the nation. These incidents left a total of 39 people that were murdered across the country, among them 7 children. The trial against the 17 defendants started on February 24, 2014.

== Context ==
On December 3, 2001, Fernando de la Rua was the president, and the minister of economy was Domingo Cavallo. The president followed the recommendations of his minister and decided to limit the amount of money that people could withdraw from banks. This restriction was known as “corralito” which can be translated as baby playpen. This restraint caused riots and exacerbated the economic situation of people who were working under unreported employment. At the time they represented 50% of the economically active population.

On December 19, 2001, the president Fernando de la Rua declared a State of Emergency due to the riots, looting, and traffic obstruction that had been in course for several days.

== The incidents ==
During the night of December 19, 2001, right after president De La Rua made an announcement declaring the State of Emergency on public TV. People went out to the streets in several parts of the country. These citizens started to bang pots, pans and other utensils in these popular protests known in Spanish as “cacerolazos.” A big crowd of protestors gathered at Plaza de Mayo, right in front of the Casa Rosada (Pink House) which is the office of the President of Argentina.

The next morning, on December 20, 2001, the Executive Branch ordered to evacuate Plaza de Mayo. One of those responsible for this decision was the former Secretary of Security, Enrique Mathov who justified this action stating it was for “security reasons.” This event ended up in police brutality. The forces killed five people, injured 227 protestors and arrested more than 300 people in the surrounding areas.

The five people who succumbed to the forces were: Carlos Almirón, Gustavo Ariel Benedetto, Diego Lamagna, Alberto Márquez and Gastón Marcelo Riva. There were also four victims of attempted murder: Paula Simonetti, Martín Galli, Marcelo Dorado and Sergio Rubén Sanchéz. Hundreds of citizens were injured. There was a controversial case of a man called Jorge Cárdenas who was seriously injured during this protest by the police and who died a couple of months later due to a stroke. However, according to the Argentinian justice, his death is not related to the excessive force used by the police.

Other notable victims were the Madres de Plaza de Mayo (mothers of the people who disappeared during the later Argentinian dictatorships). That day, like every Thursday since 1977, they were marching peacefully around a small rotary in the middle of the square. However, the mounted police attacked them with batons.

== Victims ==
Carlos Almiron was a 23-year-old sociology student, interested in politics and social injustices. He was a member of the social and political movement called “29 de mayo.” He was murdered after a policeman shot him in the head.

Gustavo Benedetto was a 23-year-old supermarket employee. The store where he used to work was looted and that is why he decided to go out to protest the country’s situation. He was murdered when he was shot in the head by the police force who were shooting people from inside a HSBC bank. This murder was registered by multiple surveillance cameras. His killer, Jorge Varando (who back then was the bank’s security chief) was initially indicted. However, he was never judged for this crime due to the statute of limitations.

Diego Lamagna was a 27-year-old artistic cycling athlete. It is not clear under what circumstances he was in the area since he was not involved in any political movement. In 2014, his hometown Wilde, named a cycling track after him in his honor.

Alberto Marquez was a 57-year-old man, who while protecting his wife, was shot to death in the back by police. This murder was recorded on camera by an amateur reporter who back then was running an online independent newspaper called El Ojo Obrero (The Worker Eye). At the place where he died, there was a commemorative plaque that later was removed by the government of the city of Buenos Aires under Mauricio Macri’s administration.

Gaston Riva was a 31-year-old man who was married and had three children. He worked as a messenger carrier around the city making deliveries on motorbike. While on his motorbike he was shot by the police. His wife saw him dying on TV.

== Trial ==
There were 17 people indicted:

1. Enrique Mathov, at that time Secretary of National Security: mastermind.
2. Rubén Santos, at that time chief of the Federal Police: mastermind
3. Norberto Edgardo Gaudiero, at that time General operative director of the Federal Police: mastermind
4. Raúl Andreozzi, at that time chief of the Metropolitan Superintendency of the Federal Police: mastermind
5. Orlando Oliverio, Federal Police officer: homicide and other felonies.
6. Carlos López, Federal Police officer: homicide and other felonies.
7. Eugenio Figueroa, Federal Police officer: homicide and other felonies.
8. Roberto E. Juárez, Federal Police officer: homicide and other felonies.
9. Sebastián Saporiti, Federal Police officer: homicide and other felonies.
10. Horacio Berardi, Federal Police officer: homicide and other felonies.
11. Mario Seia, Federal Police officer: homicide and other felonies.
12. Norberto Sabbino, Federal Police officer: homicide and other felonies.
13. Ariel Firpo Castro, Federal Police officer: homicide and other felonies.
14. Víctor Belloni, Federal Police officer: 2 attempted murders .
15. Jorge Daniel Toma, Federal Police officer: harassment.
16. Carlos Alberto Loforte, Federal Police office: harassment.
17. Jorge Varando, at that time security chief of the HSBC bank, was initially prosecuted for the murder of Gustavo Benedetto.

The former president, Fernando de la Rua who died in 2019, was initially indicted for the homicides. However, his case was dismissed by the Argentinian justice. An Argentinian NGO called Centro de Estudios Legales y Sociales (Center for Legal and Social Studies) reported this case to the Inter-American Court of Human Rights, asking for a trial against the former president.

=== Trial against Jorge Varando ===
In 2007, Jorge Varando was taken to court for the crime of firearm abuse in the case of the murder of Gustavo Benedetto. On December 20, 2001, Varando served as head of security for the HSBC bank. He directed the shooting that came from the bank and ended the life of Gustavo Benedetto. The court ordered the acquittal of the accused due to the statute of limitations of the criminal action.

=== Trial against the remaining 16 defendants ===
Those accused of the Plaza de Mayo massacre began to be tried on February 24, 2014. In the trial, seventeen people who at that time were high-ranking officials of the national government, were accused of masterminding: Enrique Mathov -former Secretary of National Security-, Rubén Santos -former chief of the Federal Police, Norberto Edgardo Gaudiero -former General Director of Operations of the Federal Police- and Raúl Andreozzi - former chief of the Metropolitan Superintendency of the Federal Police.

The crimes tried were five homicides (Diego Lamagna, Gastón Marcelo Riva, Carlos Almirón, Alberto Márquez and Gustavo Ariel Benedetto), four attempted homicides (Paula Simonetti, Martín Galli, Marcelo Dorado and Sergio Rubén Sanchéz), injuries, abuse of authority and harassment.

During the trial, more than 200 witnesses testified. In October 2015 the evidence stage was closed and the allegations began in November. May 22, 2016 the court issued the ruling:

- Enrique Mathov: guilty. Sentenced to 4 years and 9 months in prison.
- Rubén Santos: guilty. Sentenced to 4 years in prison
- Raúl Andreozzi: guilty. Sentenced to 3 years and six months in prison.
- Norberto Gaudiero: guilty. Sentenced to 3 years in prison.
- Carlos José López: guilty. Sentenced to 6 years in prison.
- Roberto Juárez: guilty. Sentenced to 4 years in prison.
- Gonzalo Firpo Castro: guilty. Sentenced to a 3-year suspended prison sentence.
- Victor Belloni: guilty. Sentenced to a 3-year suspended prison sentence.
- Omar Bellante: guilty. Sentenced to a 3-year suspended prison sentence.
- Eugenio Figueroa: Sentenced to 4 years in prison
- Mario Seia: acquitted.
- Norberto Sabbino: acquitted.
- Sebastián Saporiti: acquitted.
- Horacio Berardi: acquitted.
- Orlando Oliverio: acquitted.
- Jorge Daniel Toma: dismissed.
- Carlos Alberto Loforte: dismissed.
- Eugenio Figueroa: sentenced to 4 years in prison
- Mario Seia: acquitted.
- Norberto Sabbino: acquitted.
- Sebastián Saporiti: acquitted.
- Horacio Berardi: acquitted.
- Orlando Oliverio: acquitted.
- Jorge Daniel Toma: dismissed.
- Carlos Alberto Loforte: dismissed.

== Criticism ==
Lucia de la Vega, one of the lawyers of the NGO CELS (Center for Legal and Social Studies), who was also part of the legal complaint, questioned the delay to start the trial, she stated:

“Over time, they always played with delay. They did it at the beginning of the trial by changing accusations, requesting annulments, and also with the instruction. They seek to decontextualize to rewrite an adulterated historical version of what happened in December 2001.”

Maria Arena the widow of the fatal victim Gaston Riva praised the audacity of the witnesses; however, she believes that this trial had very little impact on the media. She stated:

“They were putting themselves at risk by giving their testimonies since these are rough times. The police force has always been this way. It is that way now and it will be like that forever. We are all alone. This trial is silenced, all our fight has been silenced. It is as if there was an intention to stop the spreading of the information and to prevent the awareness of what has happened in the court. We believe that this is because this trial threatens all the political class in the future.”
