= Pirámide de Mayo =

Monument in Buenos Aires, Argentina

Coordinates: 34.608448°S 58.372165°W

Pyramid of May
- Pirámide de Mayo
- The monument in 2009
- Interactive map of Pyramid of May
- Location: Plaza de Mayo, Buenos Aires
- Designer: Francisco Cañete [es] (1811); Prilidiano Pueyrredón (1850 refurbishment); Joseph Dubourdieu (allegory of Liberty)
- Type: Sculpture
- Material: Rubble masonry
- Height: 63 m
- Completion date: 1811; 215 years ago
- Dedicated date: 1st anniversary of the May Revolution
- Restored date: 1856

The Pirámide de Mayo (Spanish pronunciation: [piˈɾamiðe ðe ˈmaʝo]; English: Pyramid of May), located at the hub of the Plaza de Mayo, is the oldest national monument in the city of Buenos Aires. Its construction was ordered in 1811 by the Primera Junta to celebrate the first anniversary of the May Revolution. It was renovated in 1856, under the direction of Prilidiano Pueyrredón. In 1912, after having undergone many modifications, it was moved 63 metres (68.9 yards) to the east, with the idea that a much larger monument would eventually be constructed around it.

The monument is crowned by an allegory of Liberty, the work of the French sculptor Joseph Dubourdieu. From the ground to the peak of the statue's Phrygian cap, the Pyramid measures 18.76 metres (61.5 feet).

The pyramid was designated National Historic Monument of Argentina in 1942

== History ==
=== Inauguration ===
On April 5, 1811, with the approval of the Buenos Aires Cabildo, it was decided that the program of festivities commemorating the first anniversary of the Revolución de Mayo would include the construction of a pyramid. History does not record why a pyramidal form was chosen for the monument. Some speculate that it was an attempt to emulate the pyramids carved into the pillars of Paris' Porte Saint-Denis, to which the Pirámide de Mayo bears some resemblance. Since 1763 the Plaza de Mayo had been divided by the Recova (Arcade) into two smaller plazas: the one facing the eventual site of the Casa Rosada was known as the Plazoleta del Fuerte, and the one facing the Cabildo was known as the Plaza de la Victoria. The pyramid was situated in the center of the latter.

At the insistence of architect Pedro Vicente Cañete and Juan Gaspar Hernández, professor of sculpture at the University of Valladolid, it was decided that the monument would be constructed entirely out of solid materials, including 500 bricks, rather than out of wood, as had been planned originally. On April 6, the cement was poured to form the foundation, amid music and raucous celebration.

The monument was inaugurated as planned on National Day, despite the fact that Cañete had failed to meet the schedule and would not complete construction for several days. The pyramid was festooned with the banners of various illustrious regiments that had formed the garrison of Buenos Aires, including the patricians, highlanders, mulattoes and blacks, gunners, hussars, and grenadiers. The Pyramid as well as the Cathedral were heavily illuminated. The Recova was illuminated with 1,141 tallow candles. The festivities lasted four days and included dancing, raffles, and the manumission of slaves.

Although Cañete's original plans were lost, studies later determined that the Pyramid had been left hollow, rather than filled with masonry, in order to save time. It was made of baked adobe and stood thirteen metres tall, not including its three-hundred-and-five-metre-tall (1,001 ft) pedestal. A platform supported its pediment, which was built on top of two grades. It had a simple quadrilateral pedestal and a floating cornice that extended around the entire structure. It was crowned by a decorative globe. The edifice was surrounded by a railing supported by twelve pillars, each terminating in a rounded knob. At each of the fence's four corners was a pointed pole from which lanterns were hung.

On national holidays the Pyramid was decorated with banners, bunting, paper lanterns, and inscriptions.

In 1826 President Bernardino Rivadavia announced plans to erect a monument to the May Revolution which would consist of a magnificent bronze fountain "in place of what exists today". It was debated whether the new monument should replace the Pyramid. In any case, due to Rivadavia's resignation the following year, the project was never carried out, despite the fact that it had been approved by the legislature.

In 1852 the Jaunet brothers illuminated the Pyramid with gas, using a small gasometer. The public, accustomed to the small oil lanterns, was awestruck by the effect.

=== The Renovation ===
By 1856 the museum had fallen into disrepair. The painter and architect Prilidiano Pueyrredón was charged with the restoration. He set out to transform the monument into something more artistic and grandiose. The modern pyramid was built directly over the old, which was covered in bricks and masonry to form a suitable foundation for the new additions.

The top of the statue was furnished with an allegory of Liberty, crowned with a Phrygian cap. This statue, standing 3.6 metres, was created by the French sculptor Joseph Dubourdieu from a combination of materials. Dubourdieu was also responsible for four other allegories, Industry, Commerce, The Sciences and The Arts, which were placed at the four corners of the pedestal.

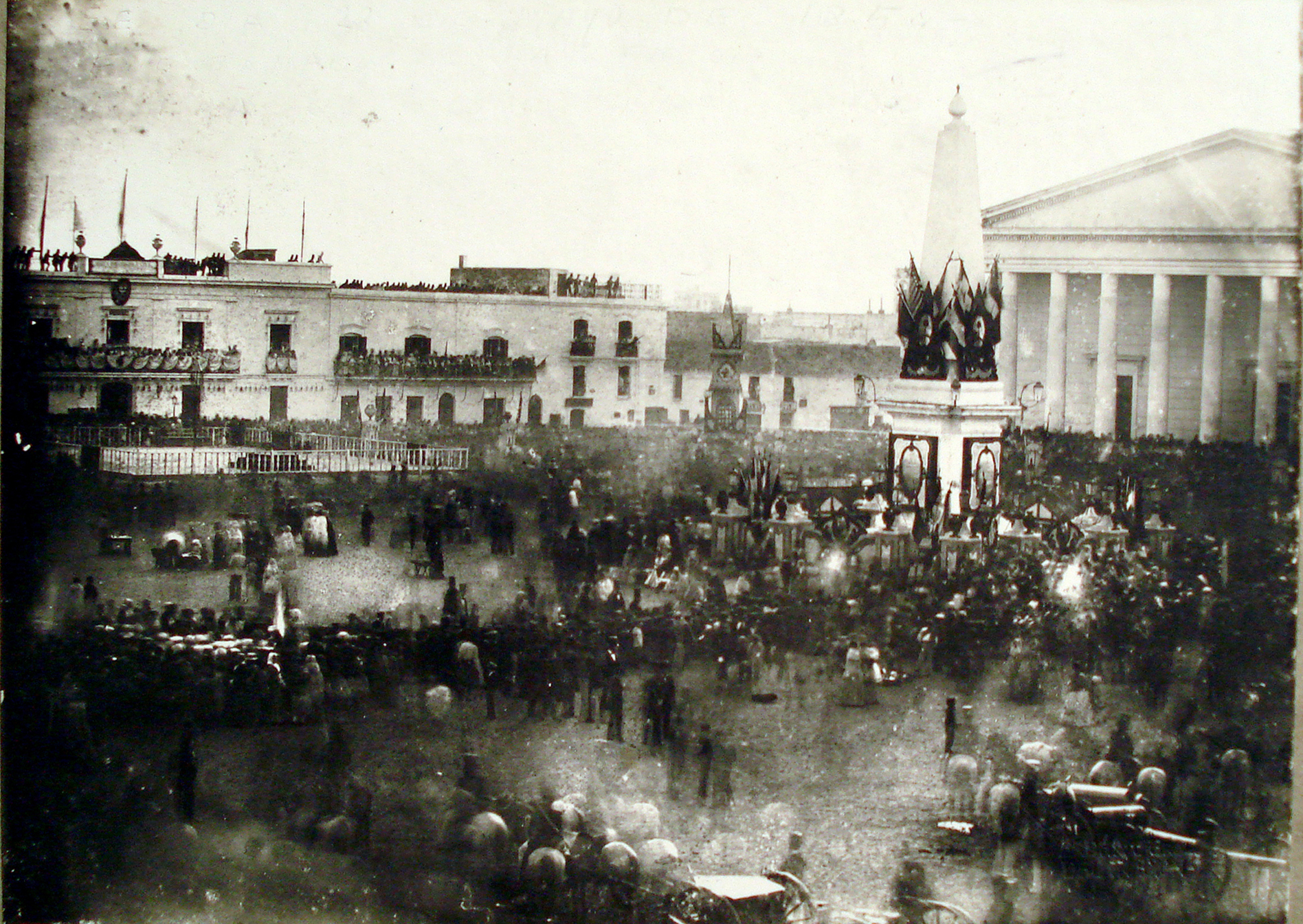
The pyramid on the right during the oath of allegiance to the Constitution of Buenos Aires (1854)

The eastern face of the obelisk was adorned with a golden sun, which now faces toward the Casa Rosada. The remaining three sides are decorated with crowns of laurels in alto-relievo. Pueyrredón also modified the original pedestal and capital, increasing their height and breadth. Each of the four sides of the base was adorned with the national arms. A new fence was constructed and a gaslight was placed at each corner.

In 1859, the deteriorating condition of the plaster led the city to reface the base in marble.

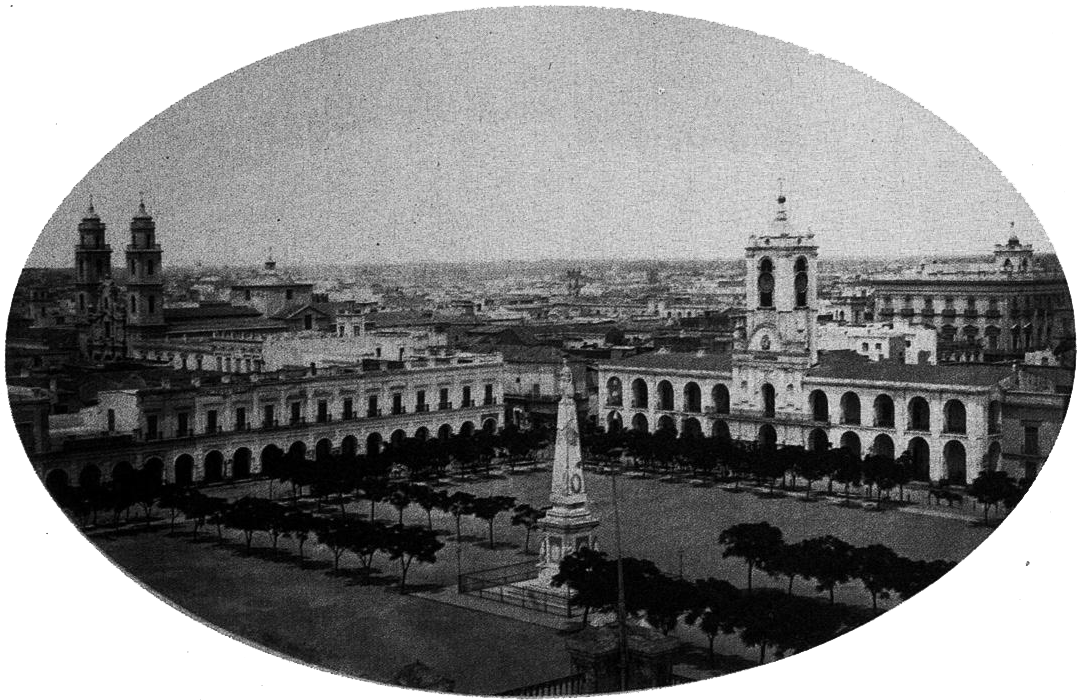
The pyramid in the middle of the Plaza de la Victoria (1867). The old arcade is visible

By 1873 the stucco and terracotta statues installed by Dubourdieu had not surprisingly begun to decay. Consequently, they were replaced with four Carrara marble statues which had originally been located on the first floor of the Banco Provincia on Calle San Martín. These were Geography, Astronomy, Navigation and Industry. These remained until 1912, when they were placed in storage. In 1972 they were installed in the old Plazoleta de San Francisco, at the intersection of Calles Defensa and Alsina, 150 metres from the modern Pyramid. In 2018 the statues were restored to their original positions at the corners of the pyramid.

The pyramid c. 1890

In 1883, on the orders of intendente de la ciudad de Buenos Aires Torcuato de Alvear, the Recova was demolished, joining the Plazoleta del Fuerte and the Plaza del Victoria to form the modern Plaza de Mayo. Alvear had considered demolishing the Pyramid and erecting a more grandiose monument in its place, but in order to do so, required the permission of the deliberative council in charge of the project. The council consulted the opinion of various distinguished citizens, including ex-presidents Bartolomé Mitre, Domingo Faustino Sarmiento, and Nicolás Avellaneda.

Mitre saw no reason to preserve the monument, because after its many renovations and additions it was no longer, in an authentic sense, the original Pyramid erected following the Revolution. He considered only the foundation worthy of preservation. Sarmiento also rejected the additions to the primitive structure. Avellaneda felt it should be restored to its original form and stripped of its more recent adornments, but not destroyed outright. In the end, none of these suggestions was acted upon, because although the majority favored demolition, the national government preferred the status quo.

=== Relocation ===
The pyramic being moved for its relocation in 1912

In 1906, with a few years until the centenary of the May Revolution, plans were put forward for a new monument that would completely contain the Pyramid, which consequently had to be relocated to the center of the Plaza de Mayo. This was not realized until 1912. After the marble statues had been removed, the Pyramid was enclosed with wood for protection. Two rails were laid, four metres apart, supported by masonry pillars that could support a weight of 225 metric tons. Under the Pyramid was a cement platform resting on solid wheels. Between November 12 and 20, the Pyramid was pulled 63.17 metres with a winch. A metal time capsule containing information about the relocation was buried under the Pyramid's new foundation.

Despite the success of the move, the project to surround the Pyramid with a larger monument never materialized. Many remained hopeful that the Pyramid would be restored to its historical origins, including the return of the steps and railing, and the removal of the "shell of stucco and inappropriate figures". However, later resolutions limited further reforms to the ground level. The foundation was repainted and the arms were restored to their 1813 condition. The original railing was, ultimately, restored.

Decree 120.412, issued May 21, 1942, declared the Pyramid a historical monument. Law 1.653, passed by the legislature of the city of Buenos Aires on March 10, 2005, conferred the status of a historical site on the area surrounding the Pyramid, which is notable for sidewalk paintings of shawls representing the Madres de Plaza de Mayo. On December 8 of that year, at the request of her children, the ashes of the organization's founder, Azucena Villaflor, were buried at the base of the Pyramid, where she had organized her first protest.

=== Restorations ===
The pyramid in the 2010s after its restorations

In May 2010, thanks to a private initiative by a restoration studio named "Uffizi", a group of about eight people led by José Mastrángelo restored the Pyramid of May to align with the grand celebrations of the Bicentennial of the May Revolution. The studio covered the costs of both materials and labor. The monument then underwent inspection, exploratory probing, and filling of the main body and edges —which had been corroded by time— and received a complete coat of latex paint.

From early to mid-2017, to mark the anniversary of its 1856 inauguration, a comprehensive restoration of the entire monument was carried out by the General Directorate of Heritage, Museums, and Historic Center of the Government of the Autonomous City of Buenos Aires. The statues originally located at its base —which had been removed in 1912— were restored and reinstalled; the Statue of Liberty crowning the monument was also restored. An aluminum tip was added to the spear held by the female figure; the original tip had been made of iron but disappeared over time and was replaced by a wooden one. Work continued on the marble elements and the pedestal, which still bore traces of vandalism and poor-quality repairs—including a 2010 restoration that had actually caused further deterioration.

A larger fence was also installed to prevent vandalism resulting from the frequent demonstrations held in the surrounding area. Despite everything, the new protective barrier failed to prevent someone, less than two months later, from spray-painting a piece of graffiti reading "Where is Santi?" on the sides of the monument, referring to the search for Santiago Maldonado that was underway at the time. The work also included the removal of invasive vegetation around the Pyramid of May and the restoration of the commemorative bronze plaques.

In 2017, the pyramid regained the four statues that had been removed in 1912 when it was relocated to the center of the square.

== Commemorative plaque ==
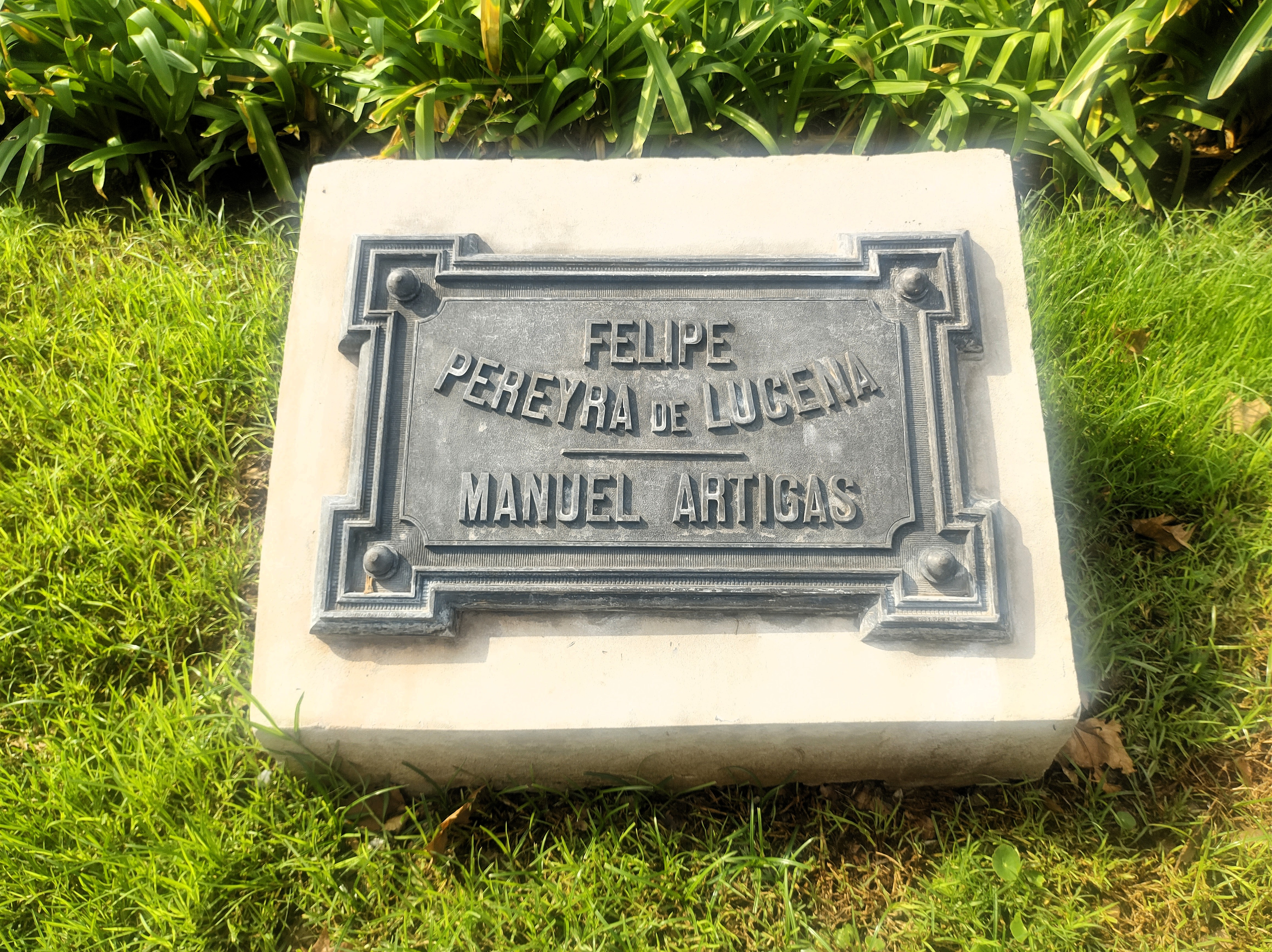
Plaque that commemorates the first officials died during the Independence war

On the west side of the Pyramid is a bronze plaque, 85 cm wide and 57 cm high, on which two names are inscribed: Felipe Pereyra de Lucena and Manuel Artigas. These names, unknown to most who visit the Pyramid, were added to the monument in 1891 during the presidency of Carlos Pellegrini, in recognition of the first two military officers to lose their lives in the cause of Argentine independence:

- Manuel Artigas was the brother of José Gervasio Artigas, the caudillo of the Banda Oriental, which was later to become Uruguay. Born in Montevideo in 1774, Manuel Artigas belonged to a revolutionary group which also included Domingo French and Antonio Beruti. He distinguished himself during the Paraguayan campaign of 1811, and was noted for his heroism at the Battle of Campichuelo. He was wounded on April 25 and died May 24 at the age of 33.
- Felipe Pereyra de Lucena was born in 1789 and served as a cadet during the British invasions of the Río de la Plata. By the May Revolution he was already a lieutenant, having attained this rank during the campaign of Upper Peru. In 1811 he was promoted to captain. He was wounded in what is today Bolivia and transported to the settlement of Jesús Machaca, where he died on June 20 at the age of 22.

The news of these two casualties was met with shock, in response to which the government junta resolved to record the officers' names in bronze. However, due to a lack of funds, the project was suspended. Pereyra's father petitioned the government in 1812, to no avail. In 1856, relatives of Pereyra once more appealed for the plaque's creation, but no action was taken. In 1891, the necessary funds were raised through popular subscription, and the plaque was installed on May 24 of that year.

In 1942 the pyramid was designated National Historic Monument of Argentina through decree no. 120,412

== Gallery ==
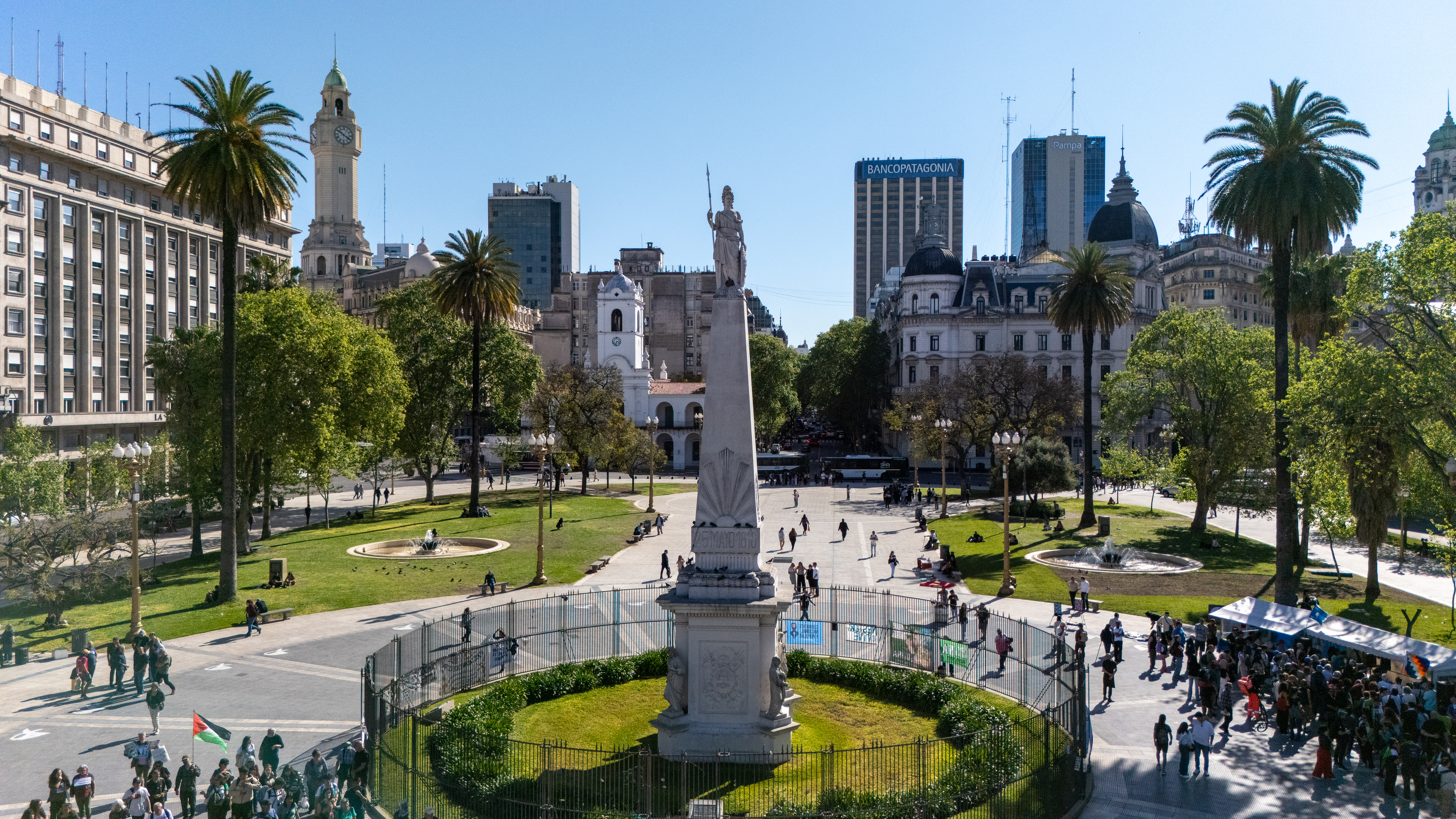
Aerial view

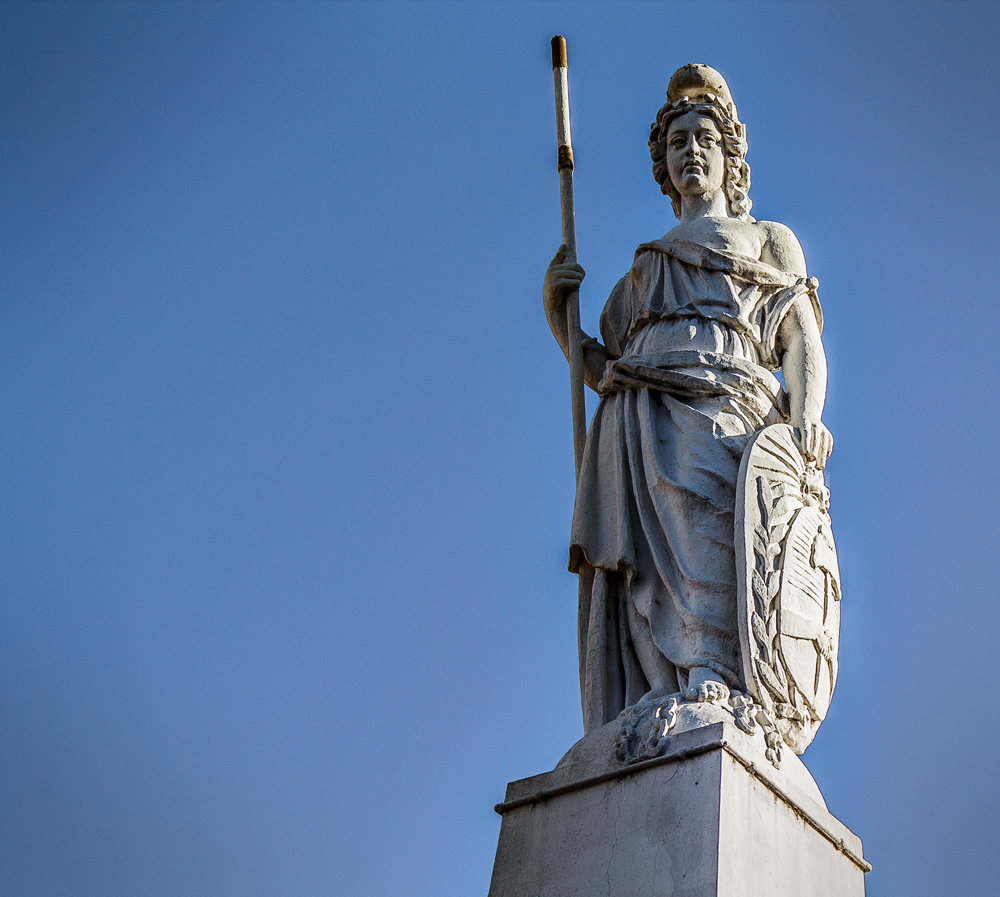
Statue of Liberty

Base

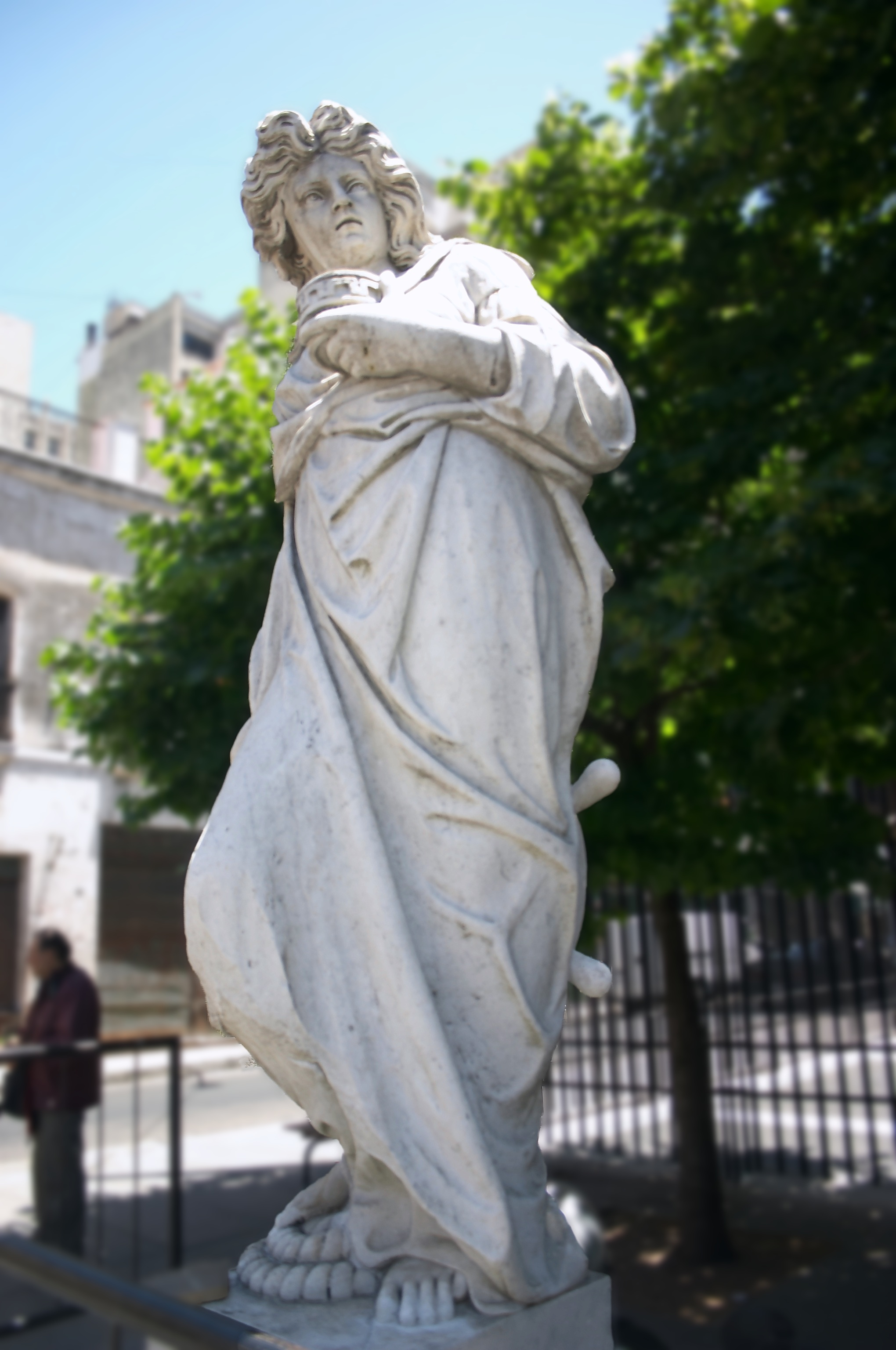
Navigation

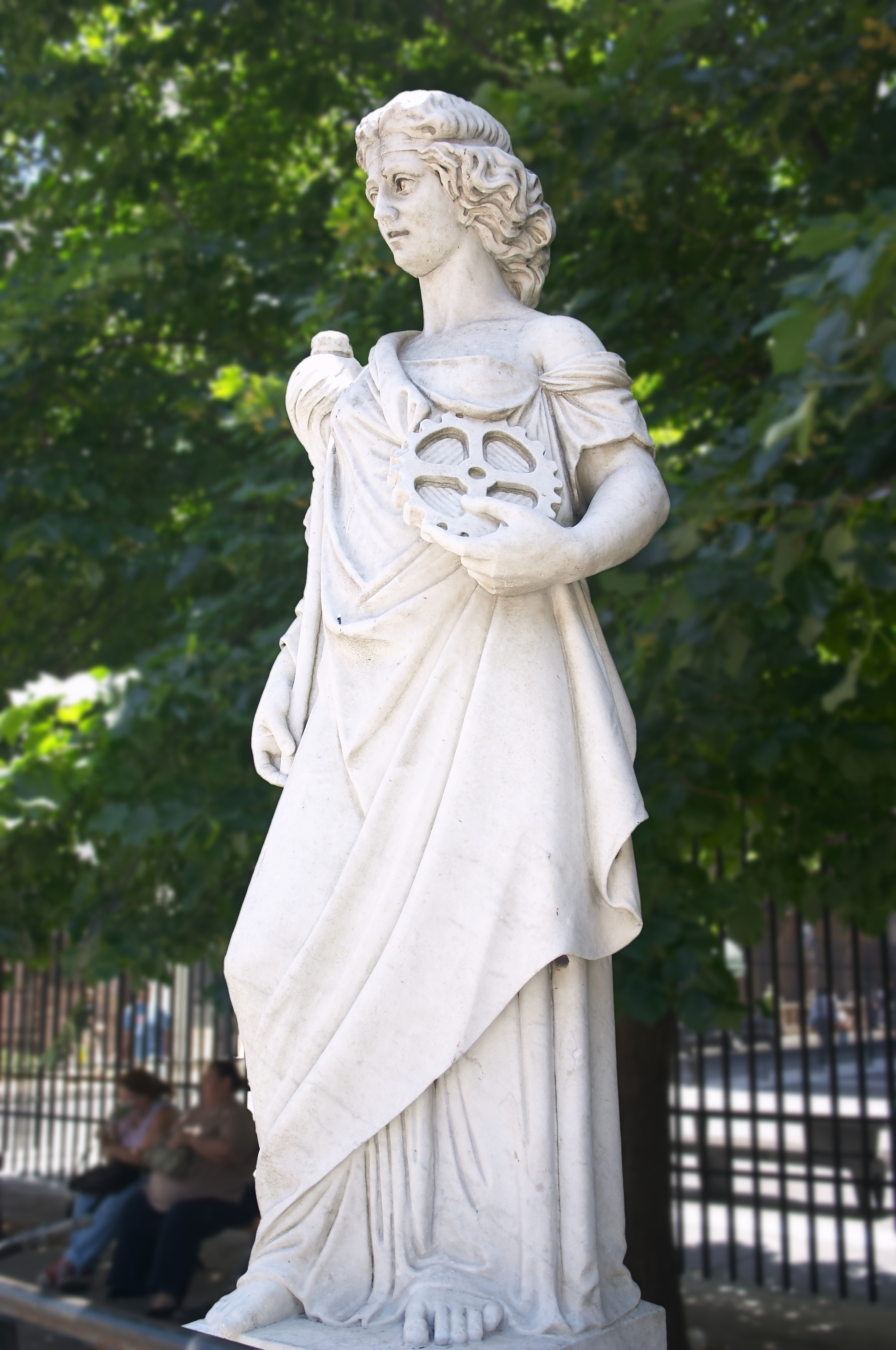
Industry

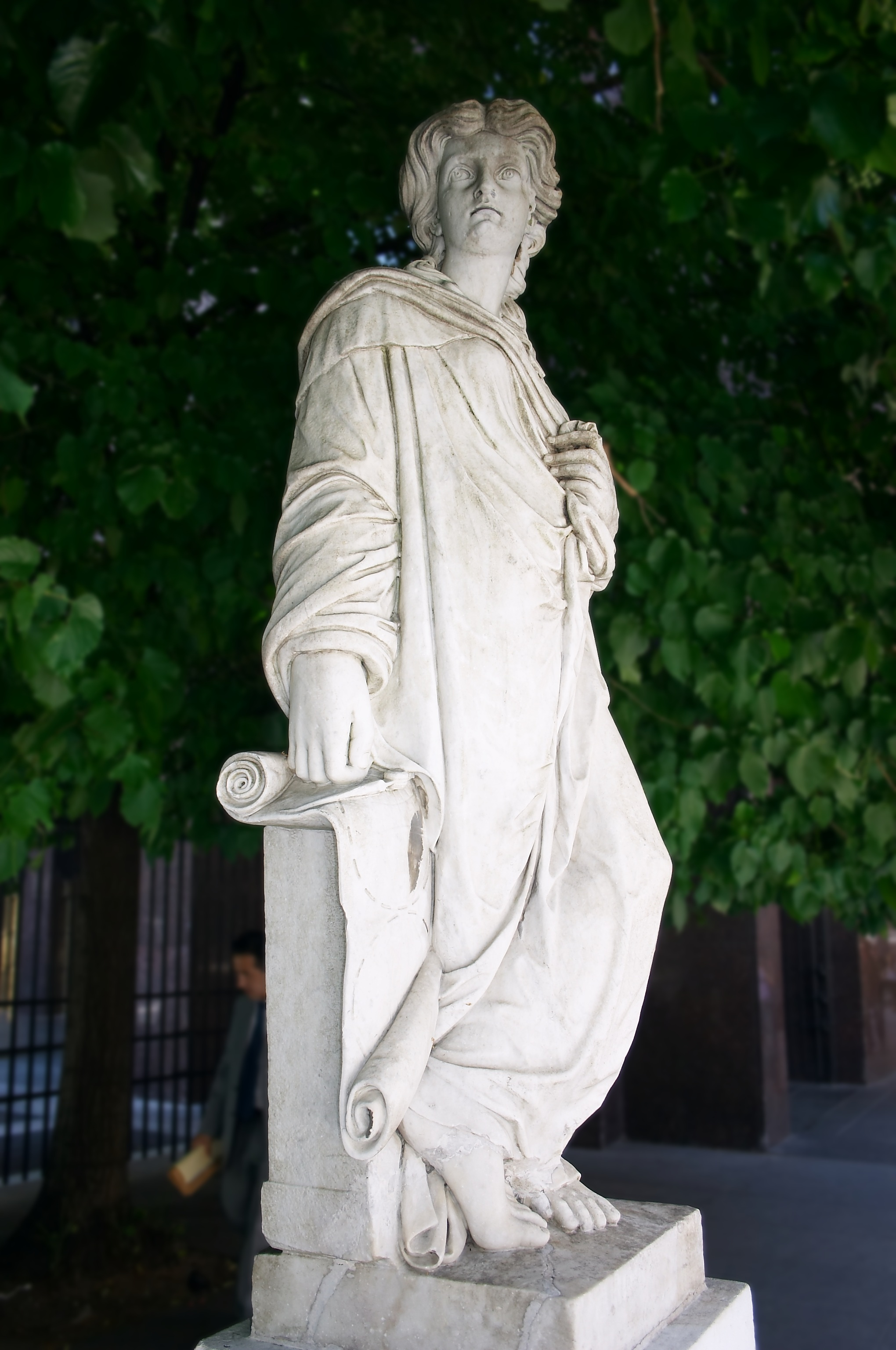
Geography

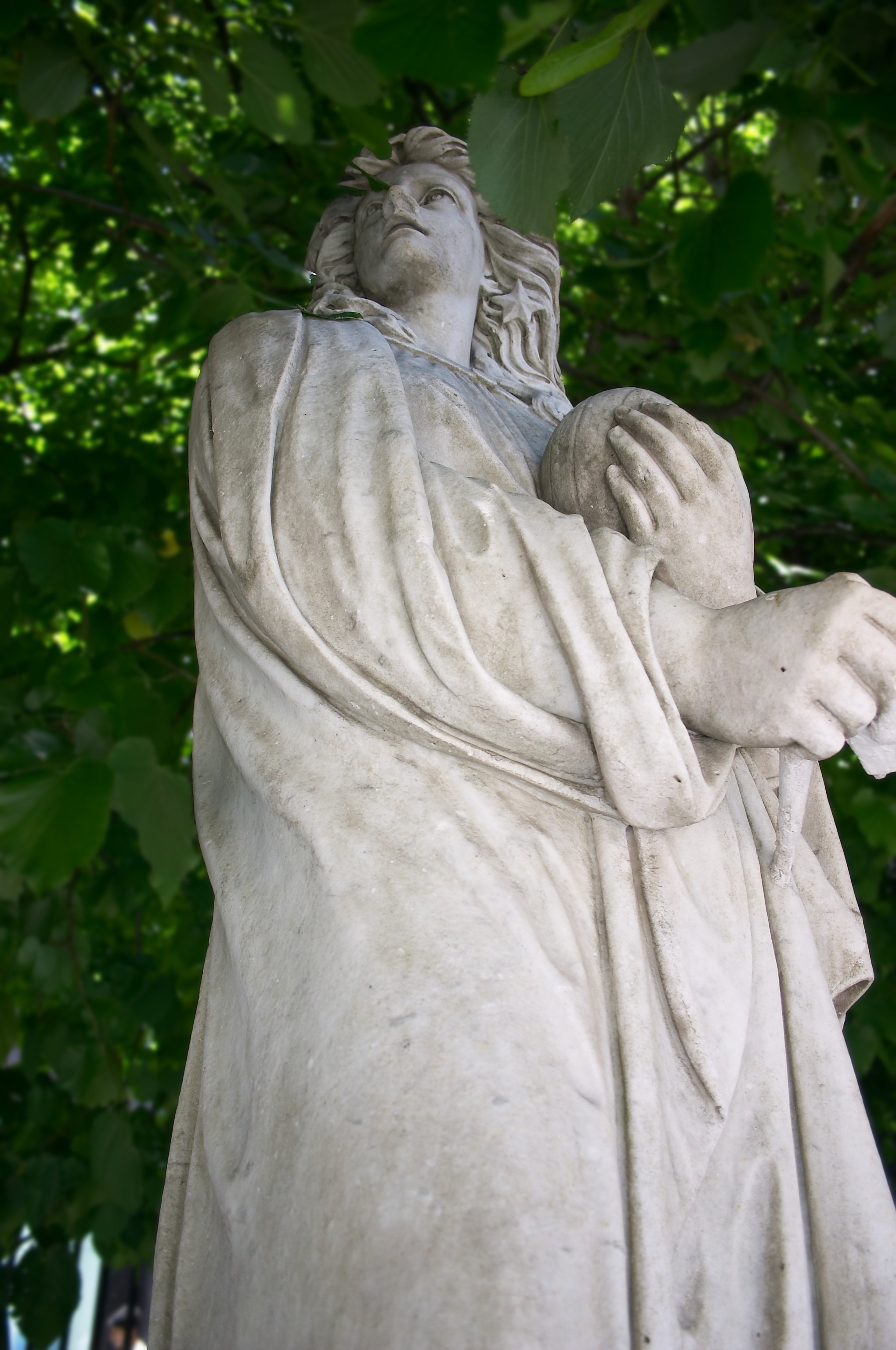
Astronomy

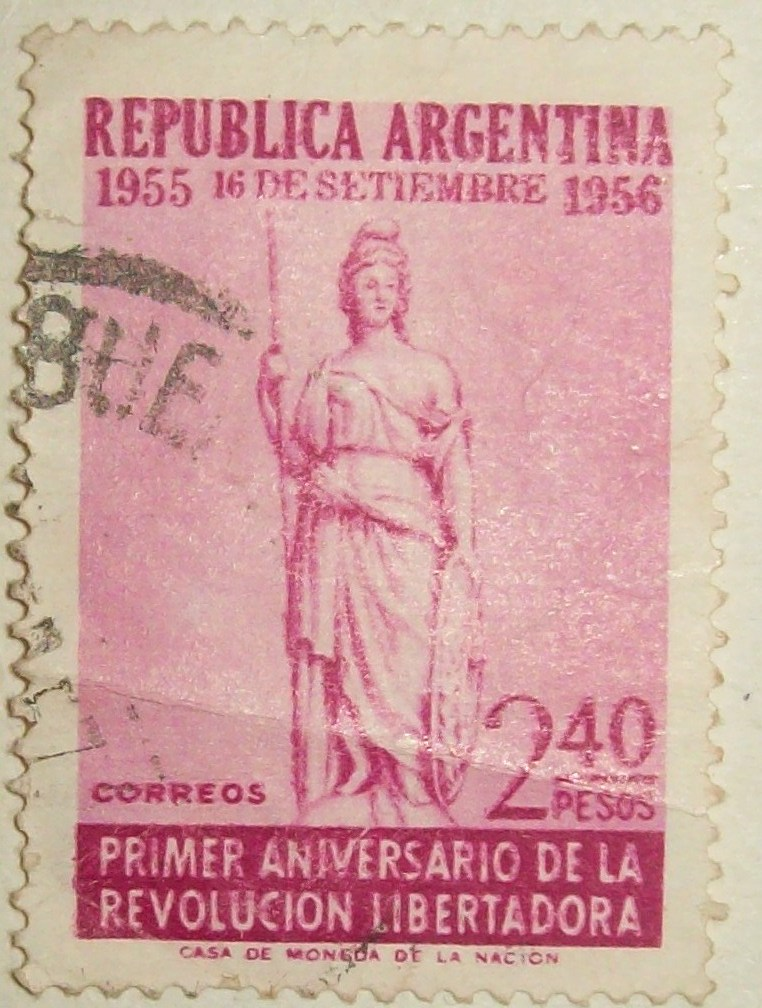
1956 stamp

== Replicas ==
In the city of La Punta (San Luis Province), there is a replica of the pyramid and the Cabildo, both constructed according to original blueprints.

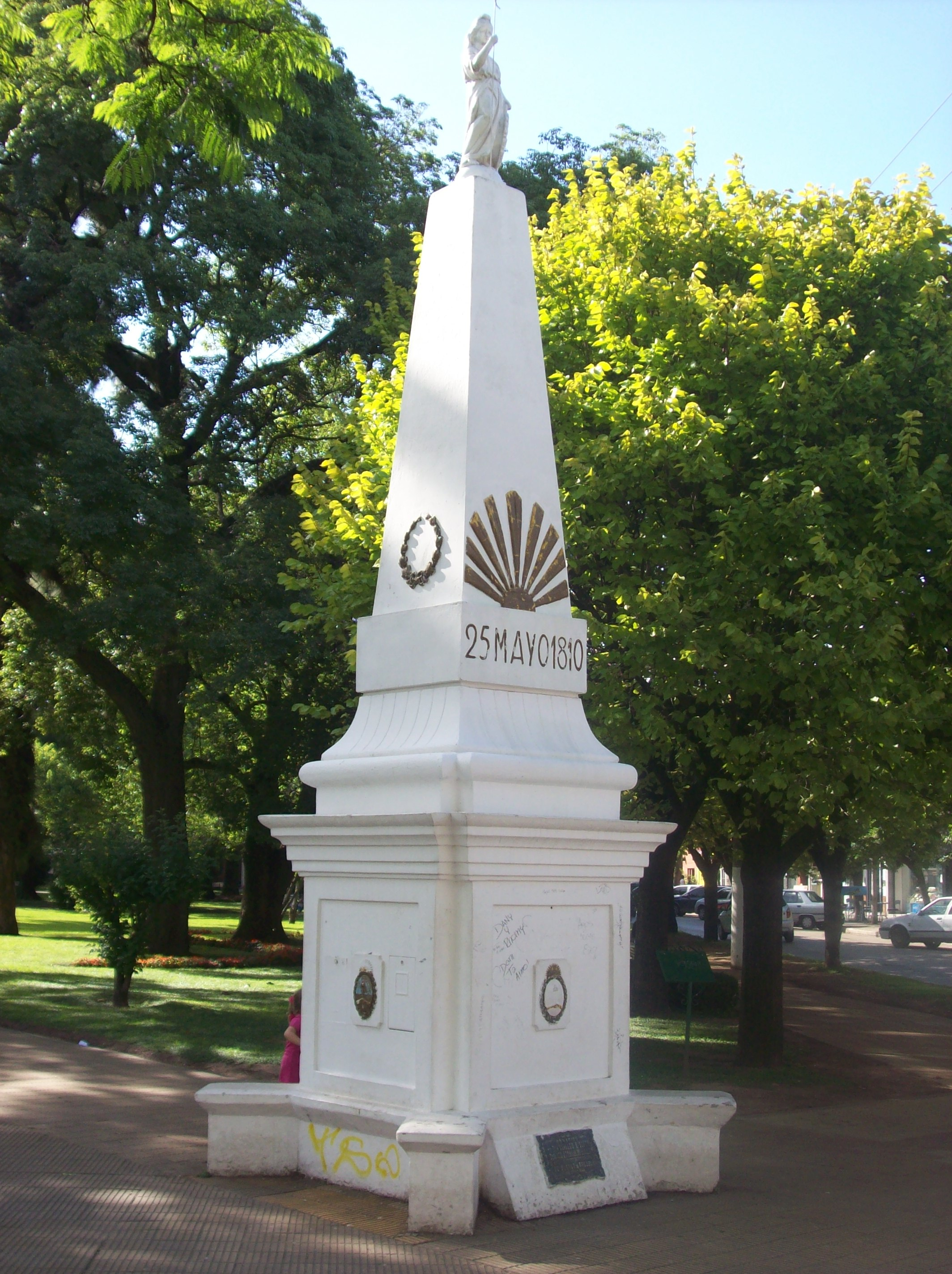
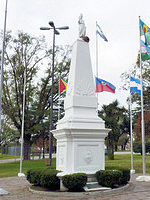
Replicas of the May Pyramid in Escobar (left) and Campana (right)

Another replica was inaugurated on May 25, 1960 —marking the sesquicentennial of the Argentine Nation's first cry for freedom— in Eduardo Costa Square, facing the municipal building of the city of Campana, Buenos Aires Province.

The monument was built at the request of the then-mayor Calixto B. Dellepiane and donated by Mr. Adolfo Brand, pursuant to an executive decree no. 656 dated April 8, 1960, and its subsequent approval by the Municipal Council through ordinance no. 573/60 dated May 13, 1960).

Furthermore, another replica of the May Pyramid is located at one end of San Martín Square in the city of Belén de Escobar, also in the province of Buenos Aires. It is constructed of iron and cement.

Replica of the pyramid made of wood, located in Villa Elisa, Entre Ríos

On the day of the inauguration, a chest containing prize-winning works and a message from the Dulom couple was placed inside it; this chest is to be opened 100 years after the 1961 inauguration.

There is also a replica of the May Pyramid in San José de Mayo (Uruguay), the city where, on April 25, 1811, the battle considered the first revolutionary victory took place. This event earned the city of San José recognition from the First Junta, which named it San José de Mayo. Captain Manuel Artigas –one of the individuals honored on the west side of the original pyramid– died several days later from wounds sustained in combat. This replica is located at the intersection of 25 de Mayo and Manuel D. Rodríguez streets in that city.

A replica of the Pyramid made of ash wood by woodcarver Adrián Cabrera is located at the "Paseo de la Democracia" in the city of Villa Elisa, Entre Ríos Province. The monument was inaugurated on March 24, 2017, to mark the Day of Remembrance for Truth and Justice.

Another replica can be found in the Italian city of Potenza Picena; it was a gift from Italian immigrants who returned to Italy years later.

Another small replica exists in the Galician city of Betanzos, within Parque del Pasatiempo [es]; the park was conceived by Juan García Naveira —an indiano (an emigrant who returned wealthy from the Americas)— who dedicated an entire wall of the park to the Argentine nation.

== See also ==
- Landmarks in Buenos Aires
