= Plaza de Mayo =

Public square in Buenos Aires, Argentina

- City square
- {{{other_names}}}
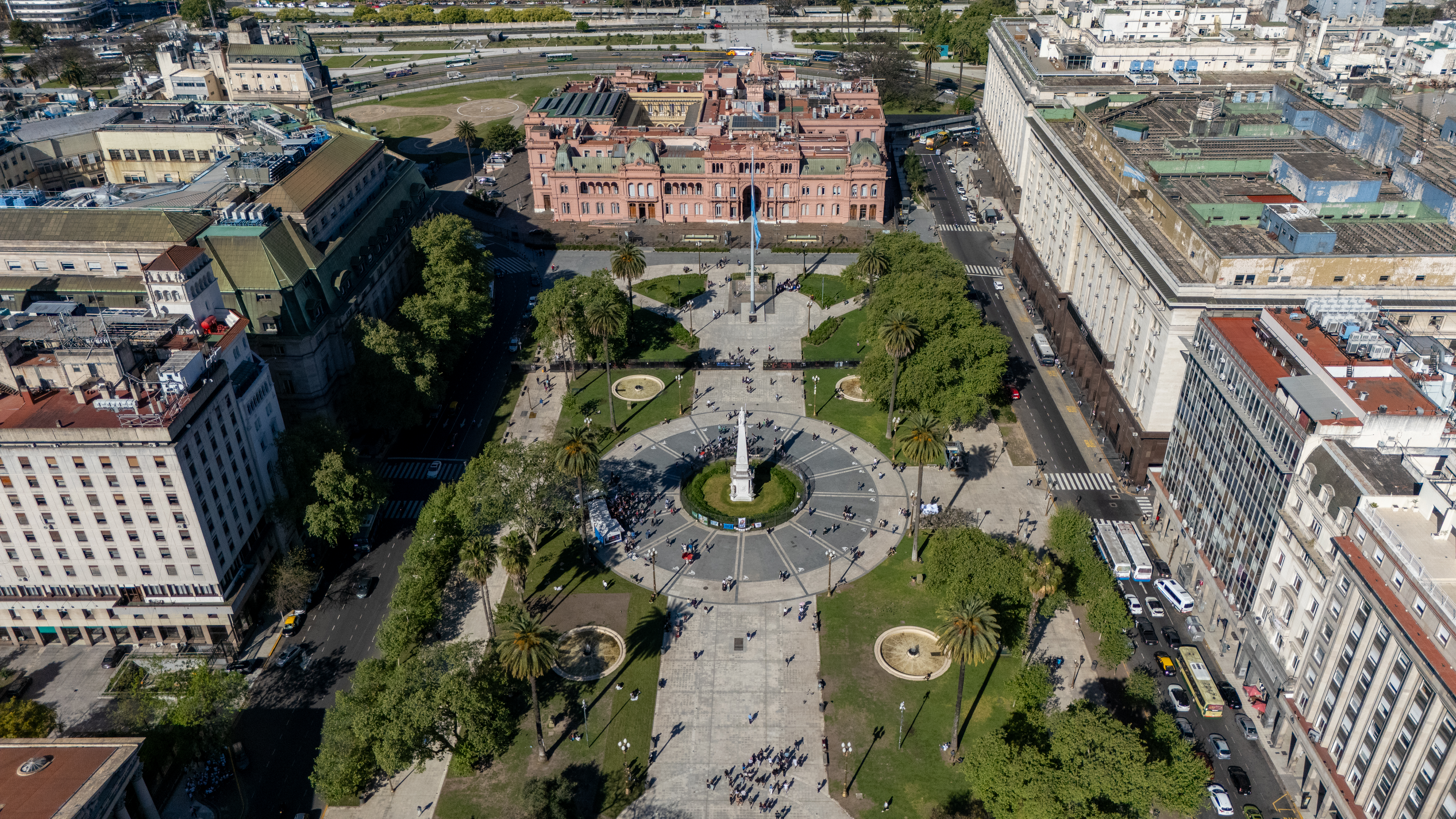
- Features: May Pyramid; Surrounded by the Cabildo, Casa Rosada, the Metropolitan Cathedral, the Buenos Aires City Hall, the Bank of the Argentine Nation headquarters and Palacio de Hacienda.
- Opened: 1580 (Plaza Mayor); 1884 (unification)
- Location: Monserrat; Buenos Aires, Argentina
- Location of Plaza de Mayo in Buenos Aires Plaza de Mayo (Greater Buenos Aires) Plaza de Mayo (Argentina)
- Coordinates: 34°36′30″S 58°22′19″W

The Plaza de Mayo (Latin American Spanish pronunciation: [ˈplasa ðe ˈmaʝo], Rioplatense: [- ˈmaʒo, - ˈmaʃo]; English: May Square) is the main city square of Buenos Aires, Argentina. It was formed in 1884 after the demolition of the Recova building, unifying the city's Plaza Mayor and Plaza de Armas, by that time known as Plaza de la Victoria and Plaza 25 de Mayo, respectively. The city centre of Buenos Aires, Plaza de Mayo has been the scene of the most momentous events in Argentine history, as well as the largest popular demonstrations in the country. On the occasion of the first anniversary of the May Revolution in 1811, the Pirámide de Mayo (English: May Pyramid) was inaugurated in the square's hub, becoming Buenos Aires' first national monument.

It is located in the financial district known as microcentro, within the barrio (English: neighborhood) of Monserrat. It is bounded by Bolívar, Hipólito Yrigoyen, Balcarce and Avenida Rivadavia streets; and from its west side three important avenues are born: Avenida Presidente Julio Argentino Roca, Avenida Roque Sáenz Peña and Avenida de Mayo. In the square's surroundings are several significant monuments and points of interest: the Cabildo, the Casa Rosada (seat of the President of Argentina), the Metropolitan Cathedral, the Buenos Aires City Hall, and the Bank of the Argentine Nation's headquarters. Underneath its lands are the Underground stations of Plaza de Mayo (Line A), Catedral (Line D), and Bolívar (Line E).

== History ==
The modern plaza took form in 1884 when the colonnade separating the Plaza de la Victoria and the Plaza del Fuerte was demolished. Its origins, however, can be traced back to Juan de Garay's foundation of Buenos Aires itself, in 1580. Newly arrived to the dusty riverbank settlement, Jesuit clergymen in 1608 secured a title to much of the 2 hectares (4.9 acres) lot, on which Garay's earlier plans for a central plaza had been abandoned. In 1661, the local governor purchased the eastern half for inclusion into the grounds of the city's new fort; this section soon became the Plaza de Armas.

Following over a century of overuse and neglect, the local colonial government attempted to give a semblance of order to the plaza by having a colonnade built across it from north to south. Completed in 1804, the Romanesque structure became the plaza's market and the lot to the west of the colonnade became the Plaza de la Victoria. The area continued divided between these two plazas until 1883 and with only minor changes in landscaping, chief among them the 1811 addition of the May Pyramid, a monument put up to commemorate the newly independent "Provinces of the Rio de la Plata". That year, however, Mayor Torcuato de Alvear ordered the space modernized, resulting in the colonnade's demolition and the creation of the modern Plaza de Mayo.

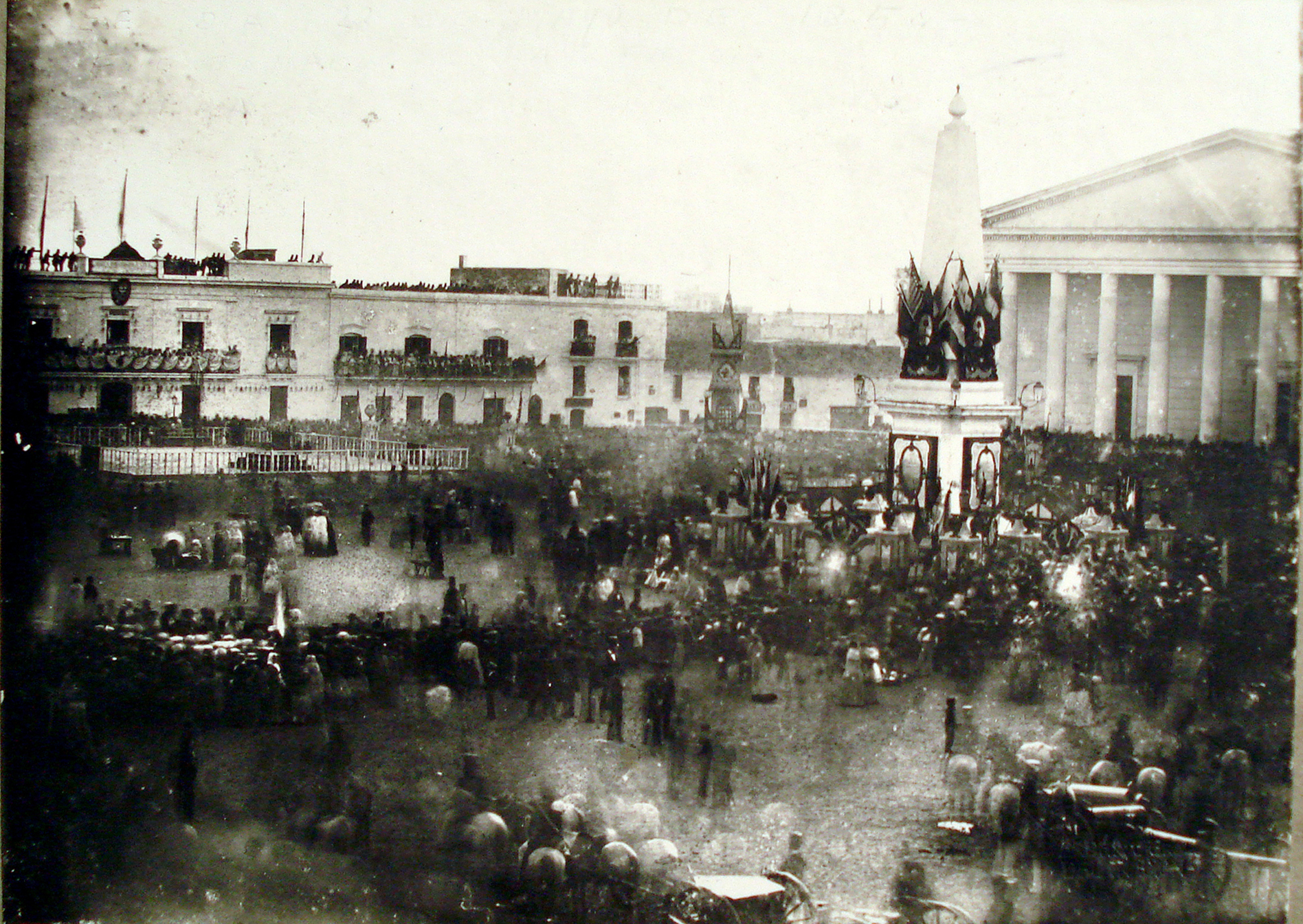
Oath of the Constitution of Buenos Aires, 1854.

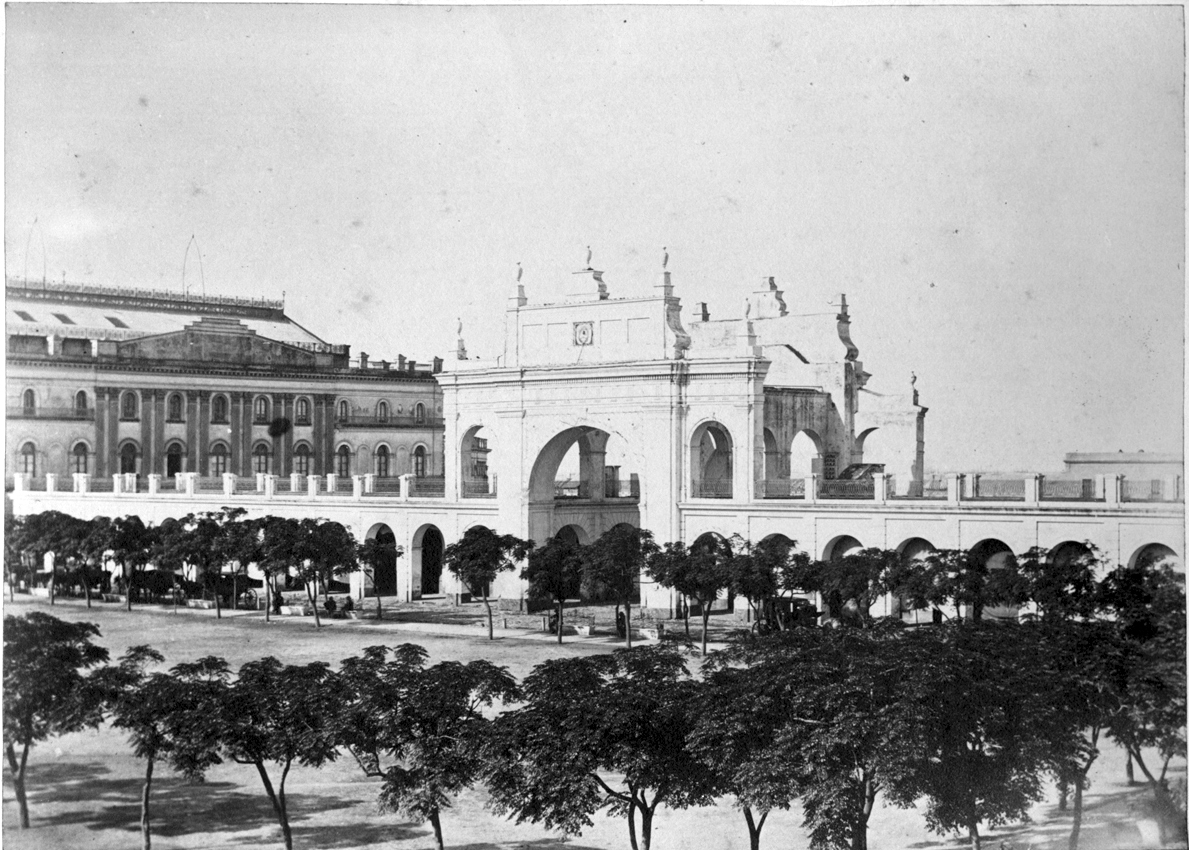
The old colonnade, 1864.

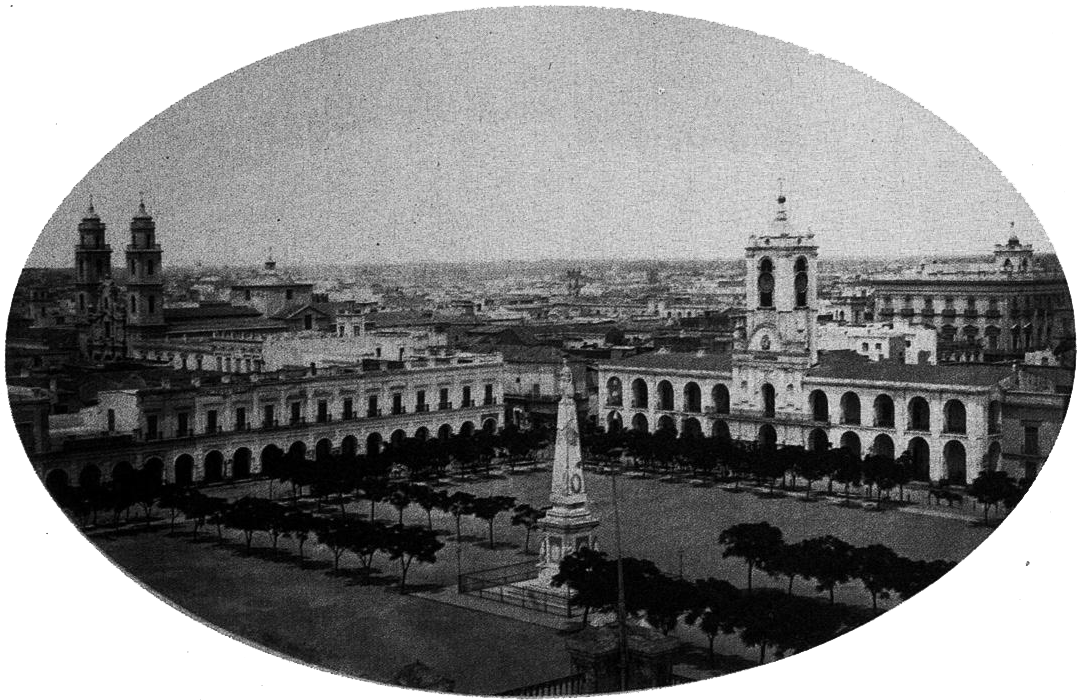
1867 view of the Plaza.

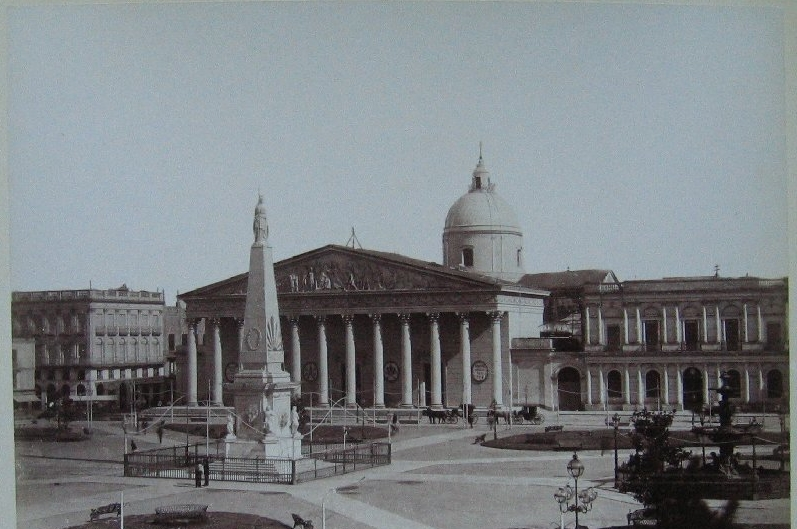
The Cathedral and May Pyramid, c. 1880.

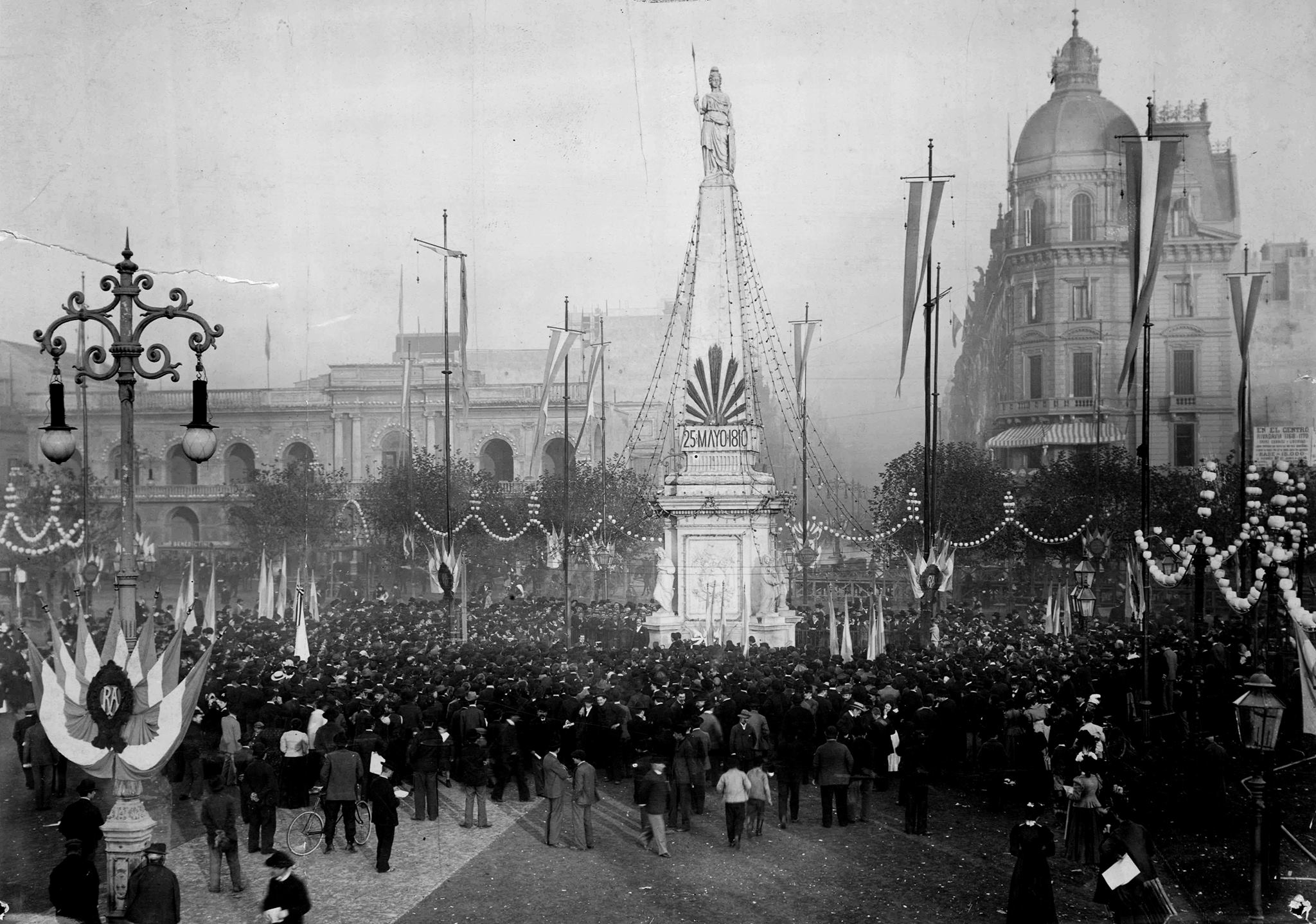
Fiestas Mayas, 1899.

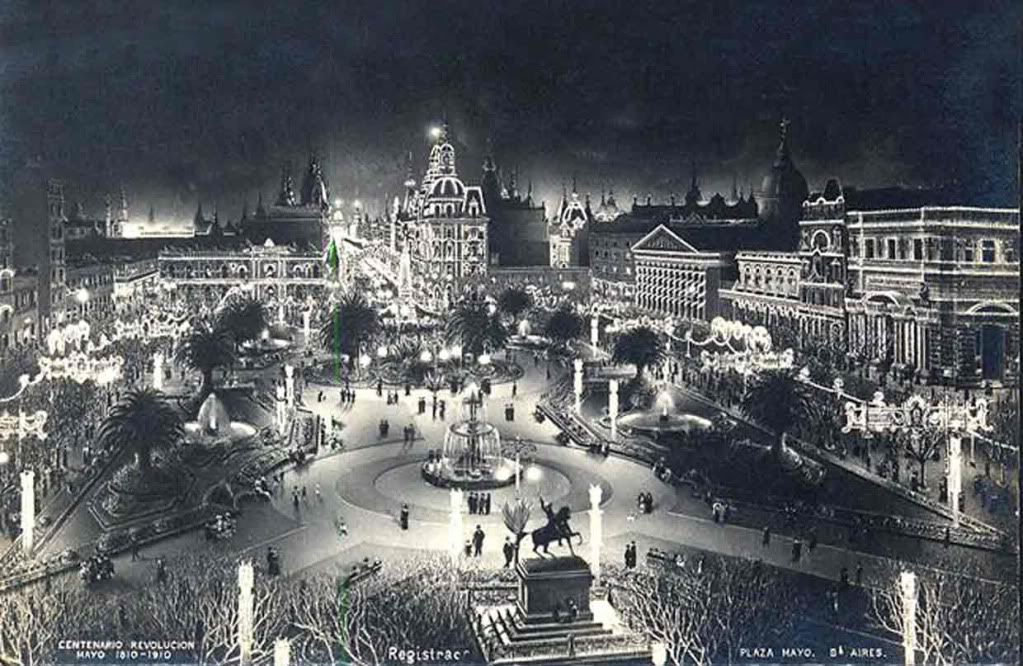
Celebration of the May Revolution, 1910.

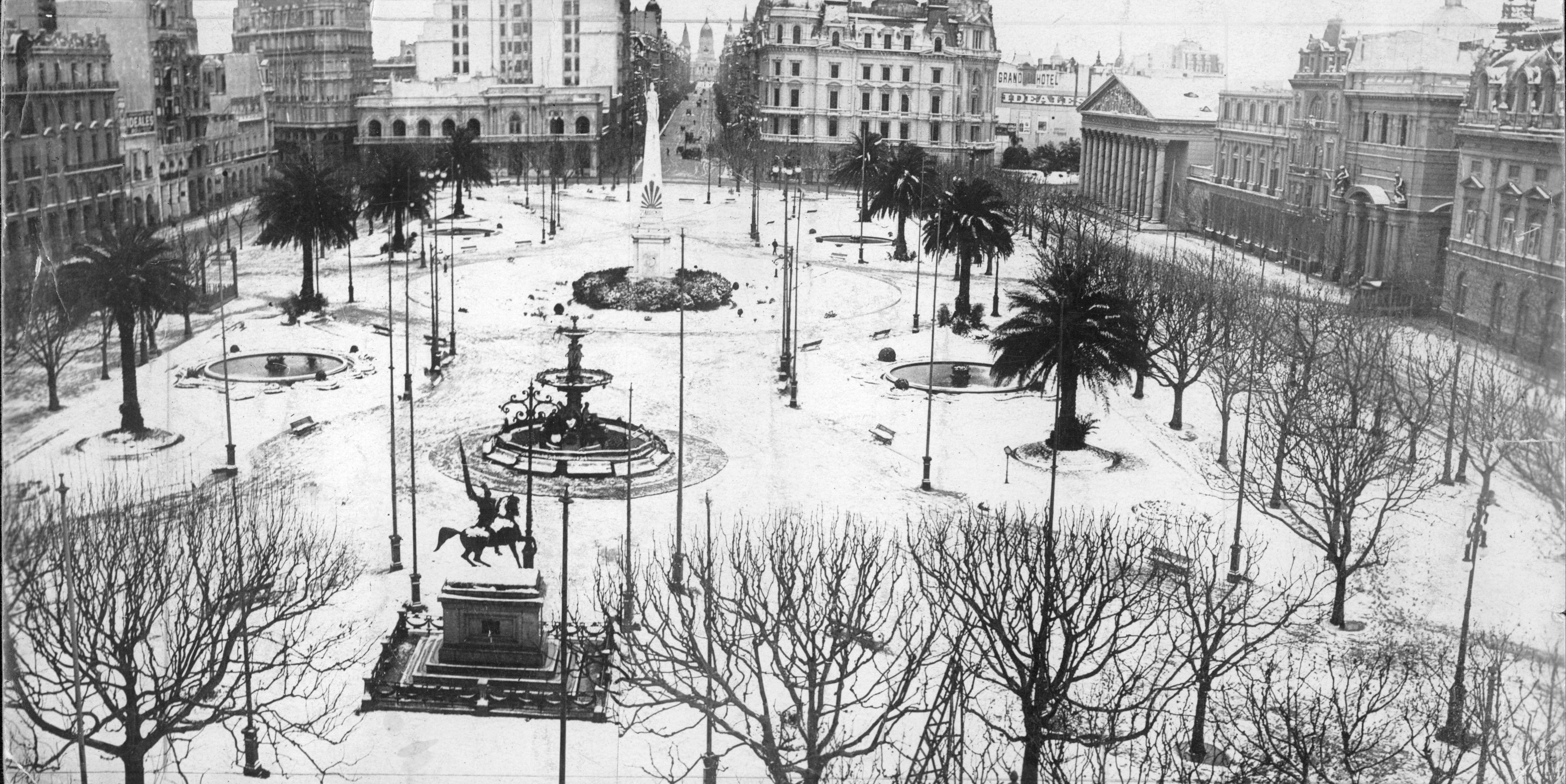
Rare snowfall on Buenos Aires, at the Plaza de Mayo, 1918.

== Surroundings ==
Location of buildings surrounding the Plaza de Mayo
Eastern side
Northern side				Southern side
Secretariat of Intelligence	Casa Rosada			Hacienda Palace
Bank of the Argentine Nation	May Pyramid			Federal Administration of Public Revenue
Metropolitan Cathedral of Buenos Aires	May Pyramid			Bank zone
Diagonal Norte	Buenos Aires City Hall	Avenida de Mayo	Buenos Aires Cabildo	Diagonal Sur
Western side

== Political significance ==
The Plaza de Mayo has traditionally been the focal point of political life in Buenos Aires. Its current name commemorates the May Revolution of 1810, which started the process towards the country's independence from Spain in 1816.

¡El pueblo quiere saber de qué se trata!, the May Revolution of 25 May 1810

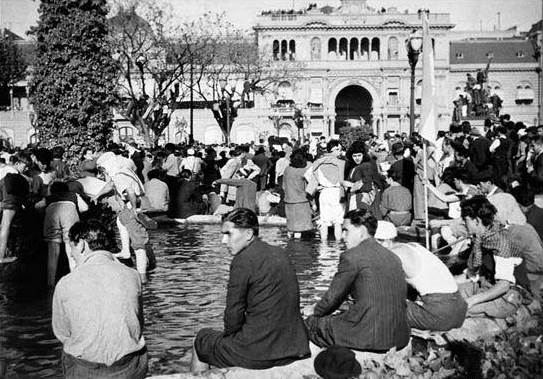
Famous Peronist demonstration of 17 October 1945, known as Loyalty Day

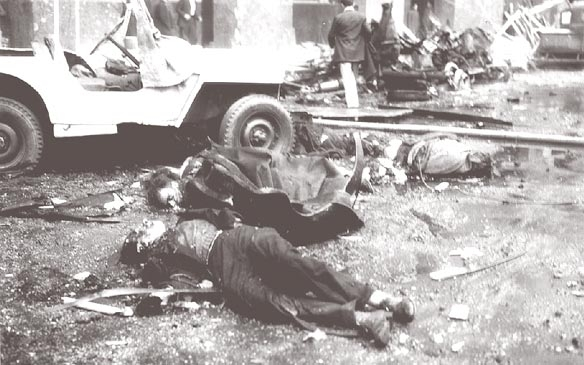
The Bombing of Plaza de Mayo, 16 June 1955

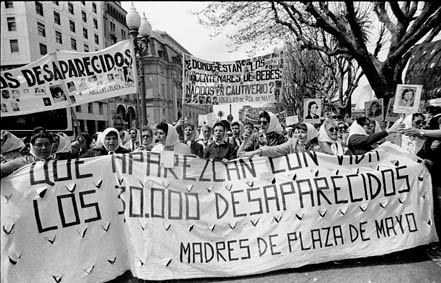
The second "March of Resistance" of the Mothers of the Plaza de Mayo, 9 December 1982

=== 1940s – 1960s ===
On 17 October 1945, mass demonstrations in the Plaza de Mayo organized by the CGT trade union federation forced the release from prison of Juan Domingo Perón, who would later become President of Argentina; during his tenure, the Peronist movement gathered every 17 October in the Plaza de Mayo to show their support for their leader (and 17 October is still "Loyalty Day" for the traditional Peronists). Many other presidents, both democratic and military, have also saluted people in the Plaza from the Casa Rosada's balcony.

In an attempt to overthrow President Perón, the plaza was bombed during one of the populist leader's many rallies there on 16 June 1955, killing 364.

=== 1970s – present ===
Years later, in 1974, Perón, then president for the third time, expelled from the Plaza members of the Montoneros, an armed organization on the far left that had contributed to the aging leader's return from exile the previous year and had since demanded influence within the national government. Perón's final appearance at the plaza, on 12 June, was marked by an acrimonious break with the far left, leading to two years of violence and repression and, ultimately, a coup d'état.

Crowds gathered once again on 2 April 1982, and several occasions thereafter to hail de facto President Leopoldo Galtieri for Argentina's invasion of the Falkland Islands, which launched the Falklands War (Spanish: Guerra de las Malvinas/Guerra del Atlántico Sur).

The plaza, since 1977, is where the Mothers of the Plaza de Mayo have congregated with signs and pictures of desaparecidos, their children, who were subject to forced disappearance by the Argentine military in the Dirty War, during the National Reorganization Process. People perceived to be supportive of subversive activities (that would include expressing left-wing ideas, or having any link with these people, however tenuous) would be illegally detained, subject to abuse and torture, and finally murdered in secret. The Mothers of the Plaza de Mayo took advantage of the symbolic importance of the Plaza to open the public's eyes to what the military regime was doing.

Protests have continued taking place, with the major last one being during the December 2001 riots when five protesters were killed and several others injured by police as they rioted around the Plaza de Mayo.

== Today ==
A panorama of Plaza de Mayo. On the center you can see the May Pyramid

Today, Plaza de Mayo continues to be an indispensable tourist attraction for those who visit Buenos Aires.

Several of the city's major landmarks are located around the Plaza: the Cabildo (the city council during the colonial era), the Casa Rosada (home of the executive branch of the federal government), the Metropolitan Cathedral of Buenos Aires, the May Pyramid, the Equestrian monument to General Manuel Belgrano, the current city hall or municipalidad, and the headquarters of the Nación Bank. The Buenos Aires financial district (microcentro), affectionately known as la City (sic) also lies besides the Plaza.

== Gallery ==
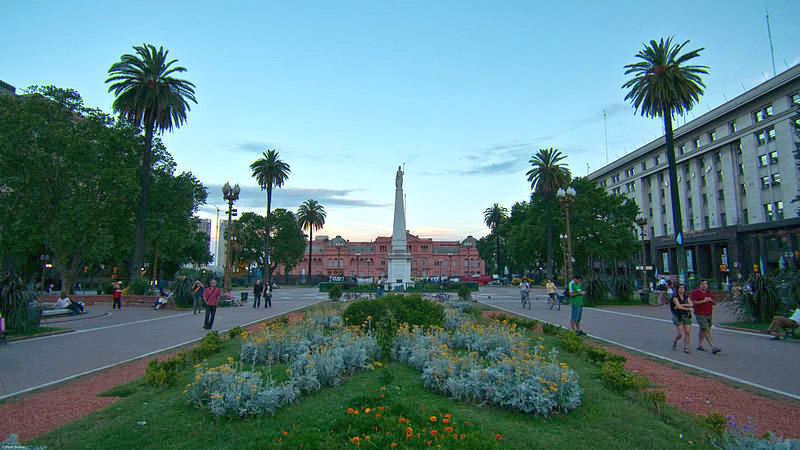

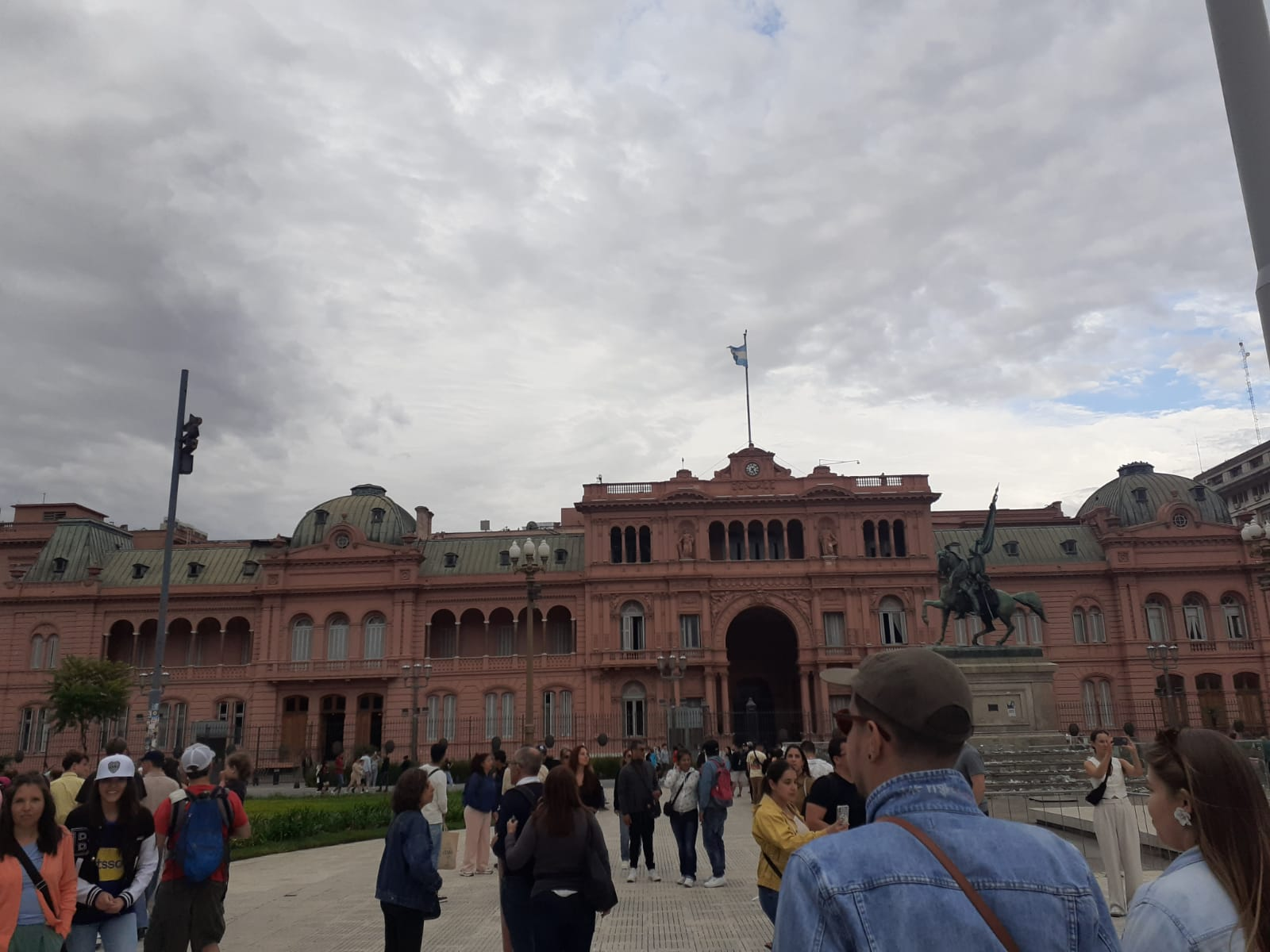

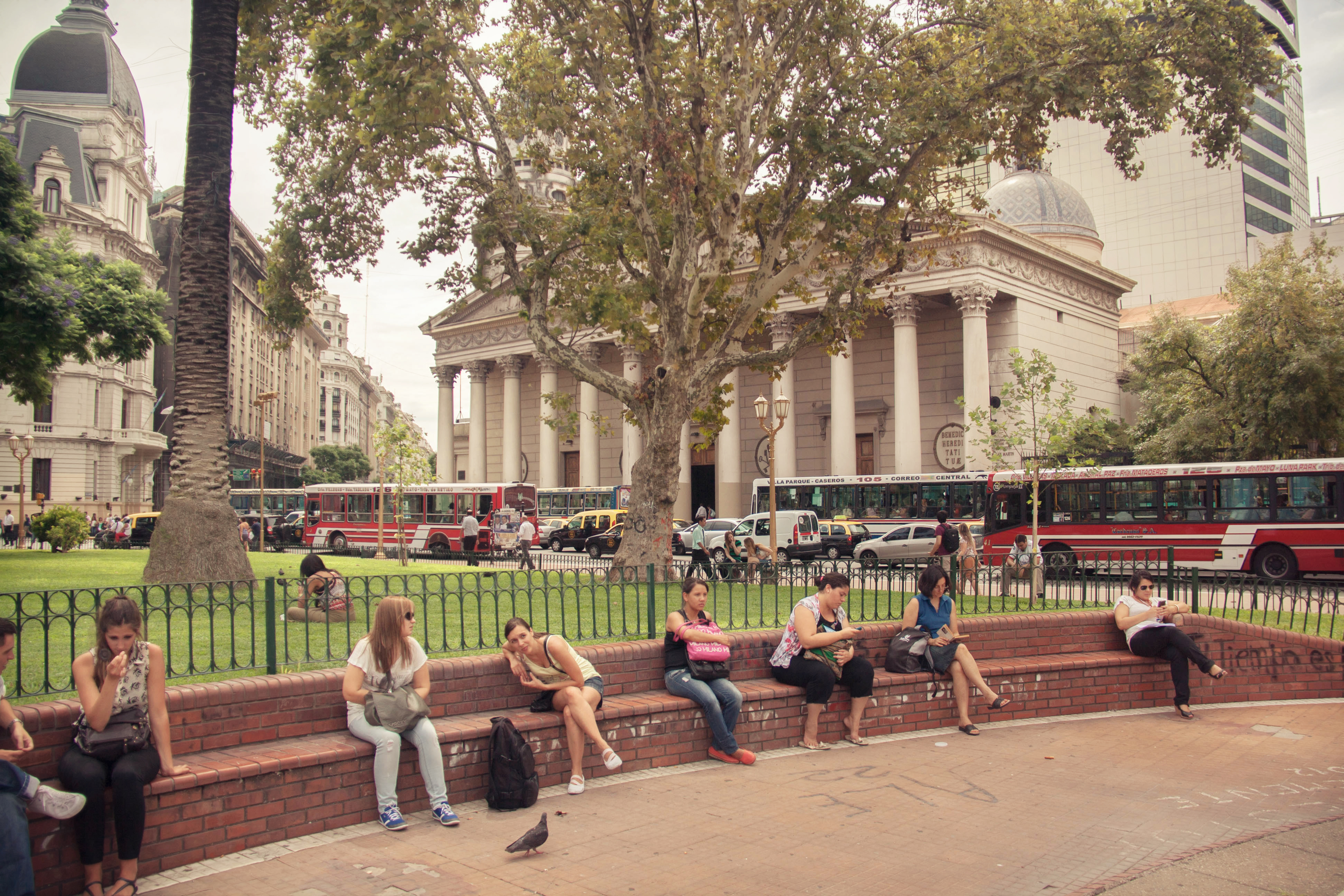

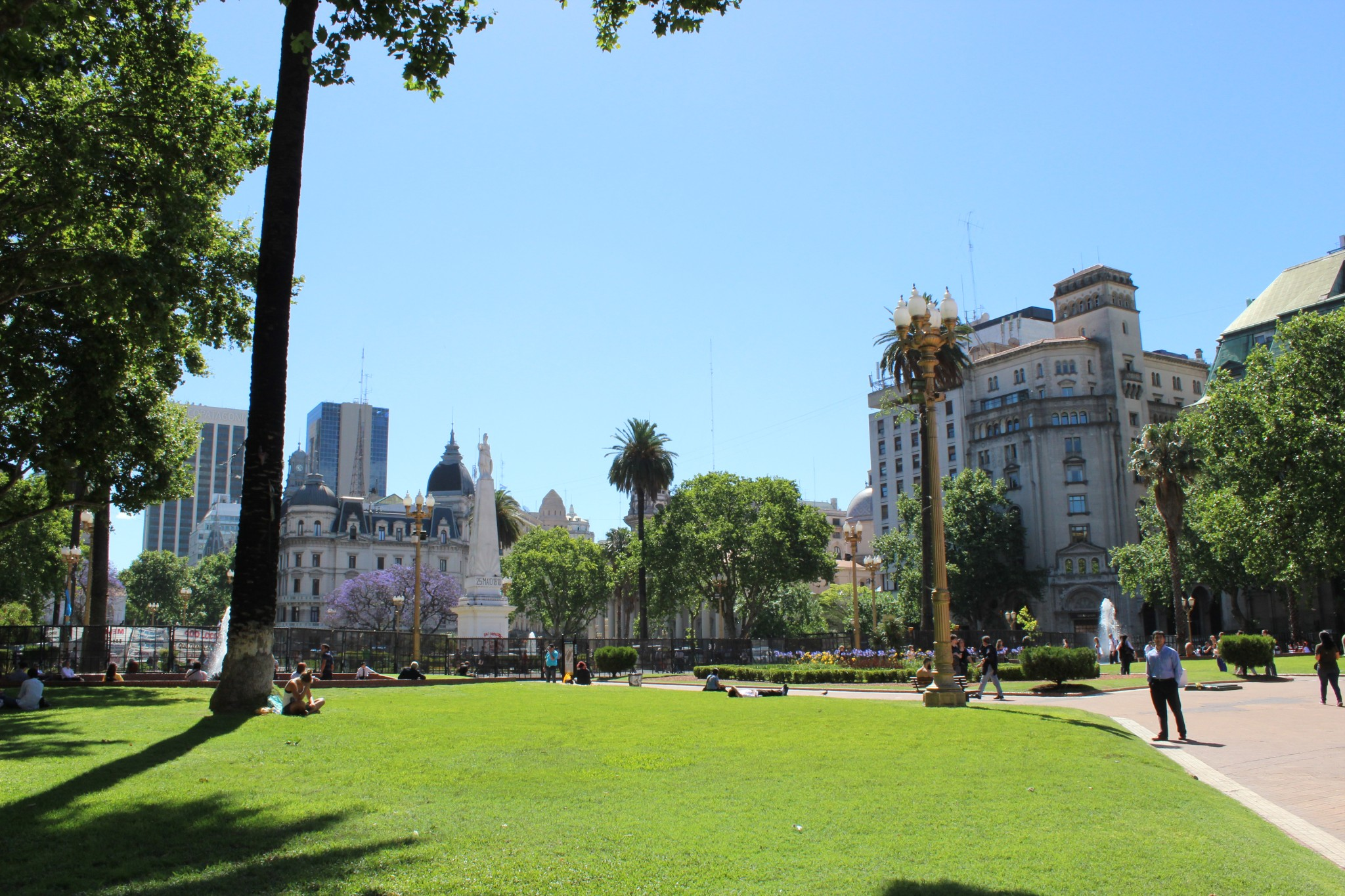

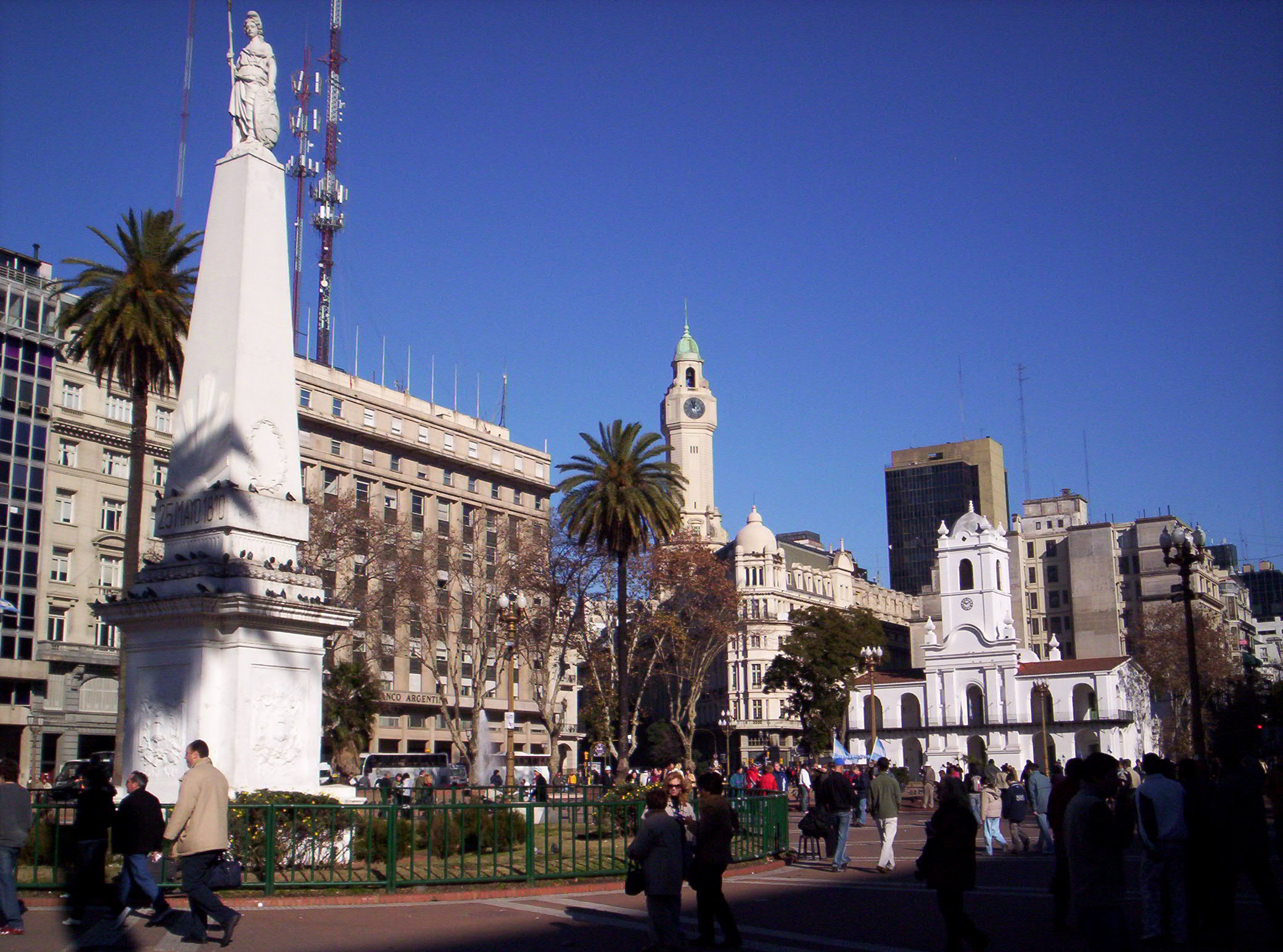

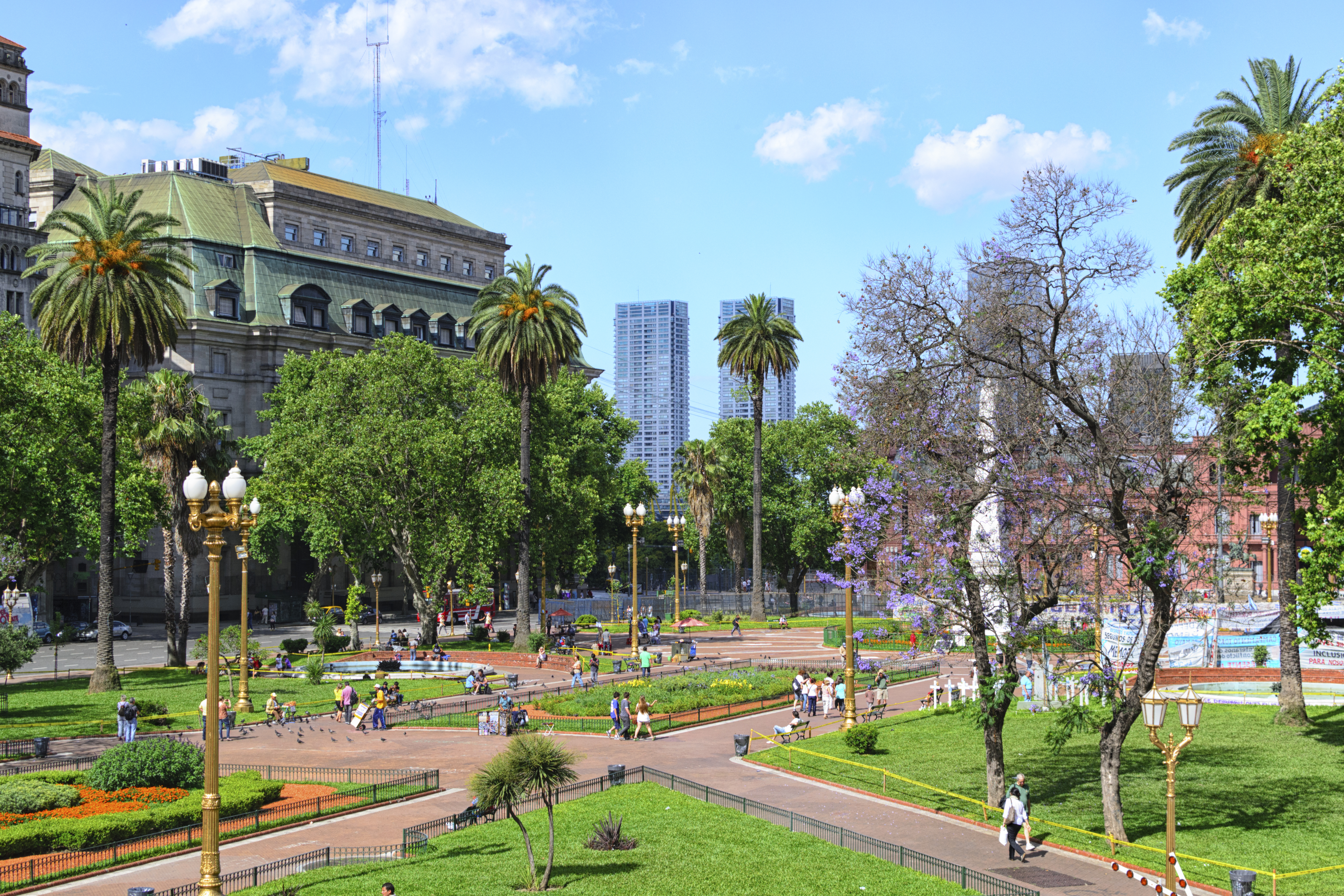

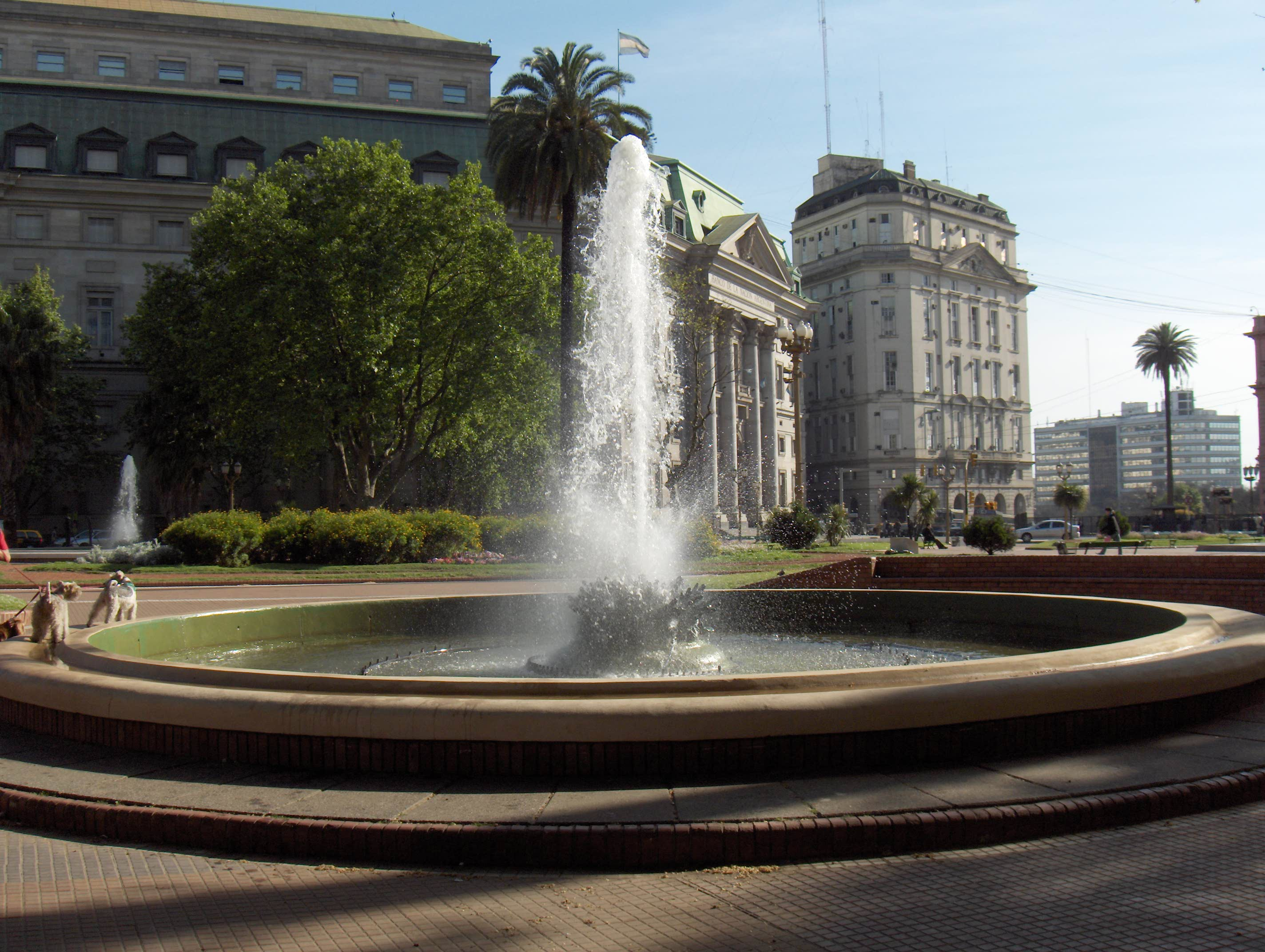

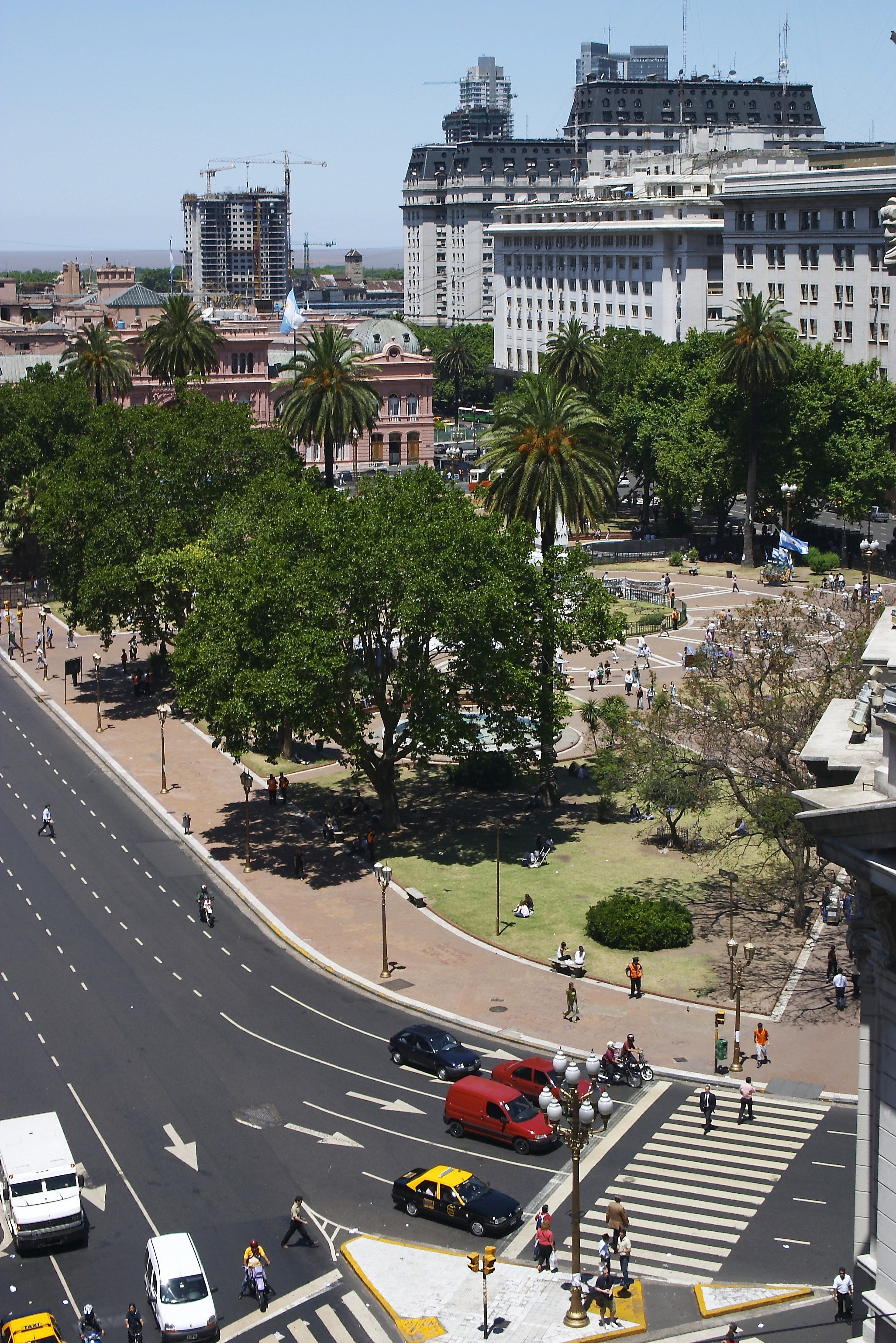

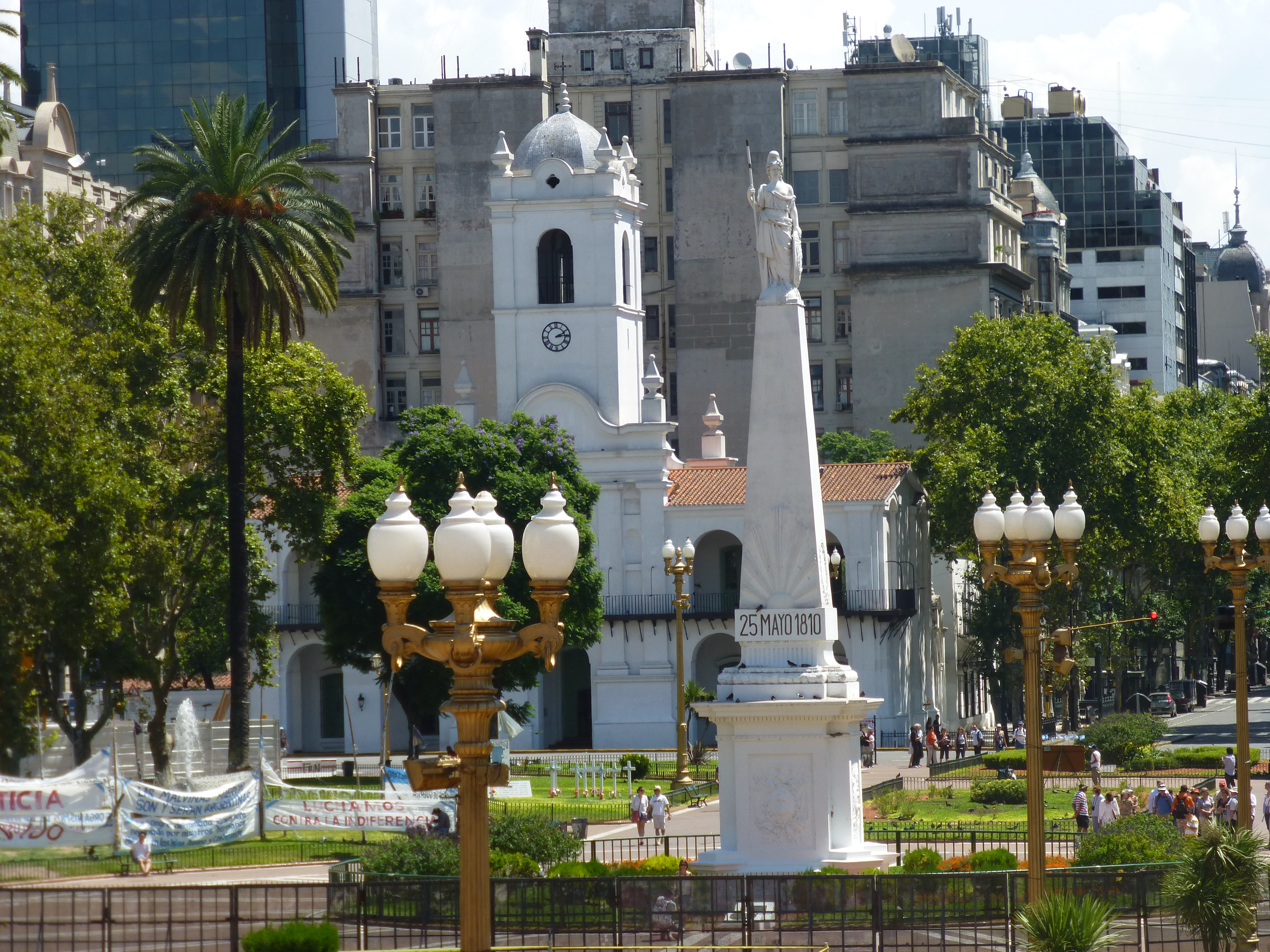

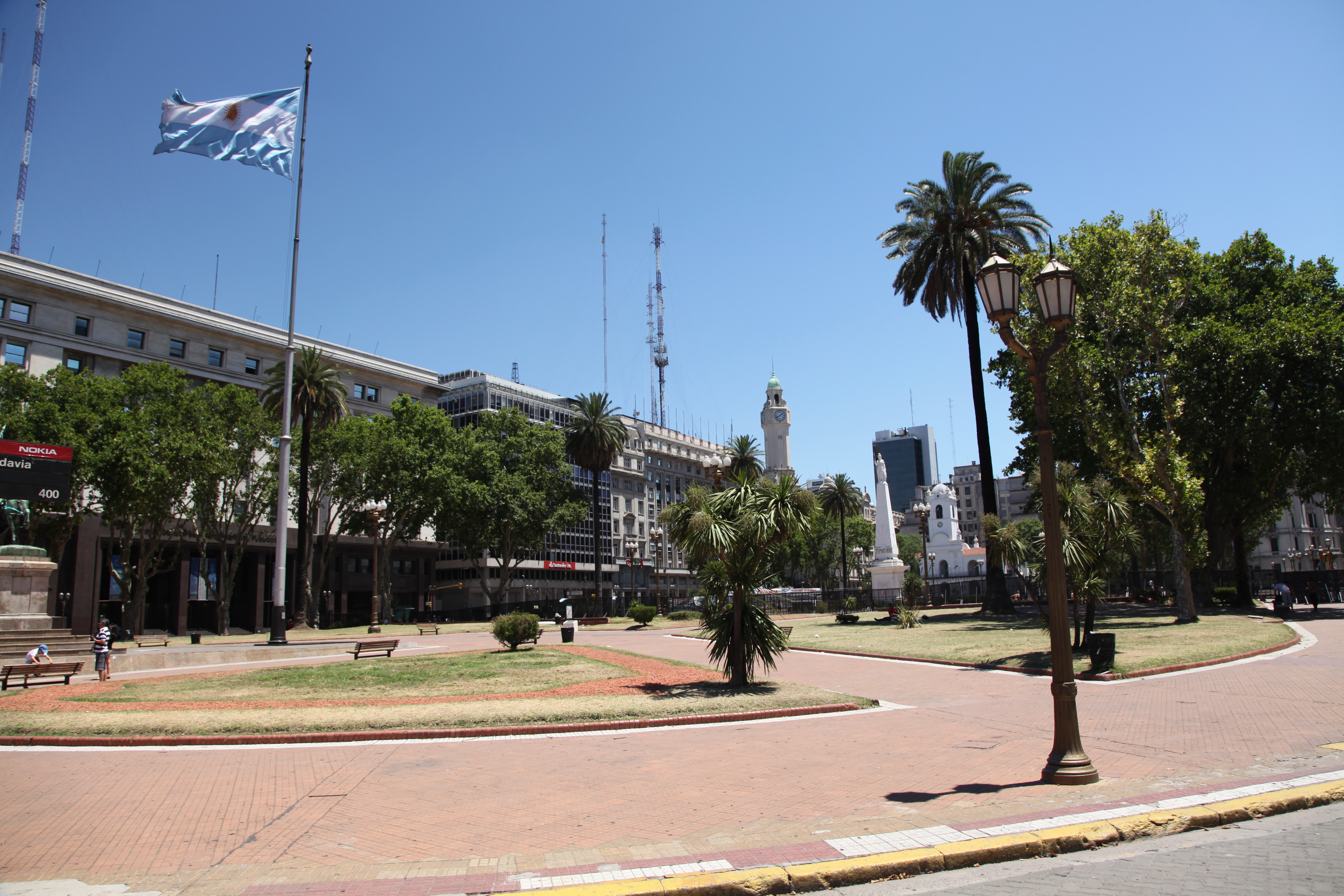

== See also ==
- Mothers of the Plaza de Mayo
