= Buenos Aires Metropolitan Cathedral =

Cathedral in Argentina

- Metropolitan Cathedral of the Most Holy Trinity of Buenos Aires
- Catedral Metropolitana de la Santísima Trinidad
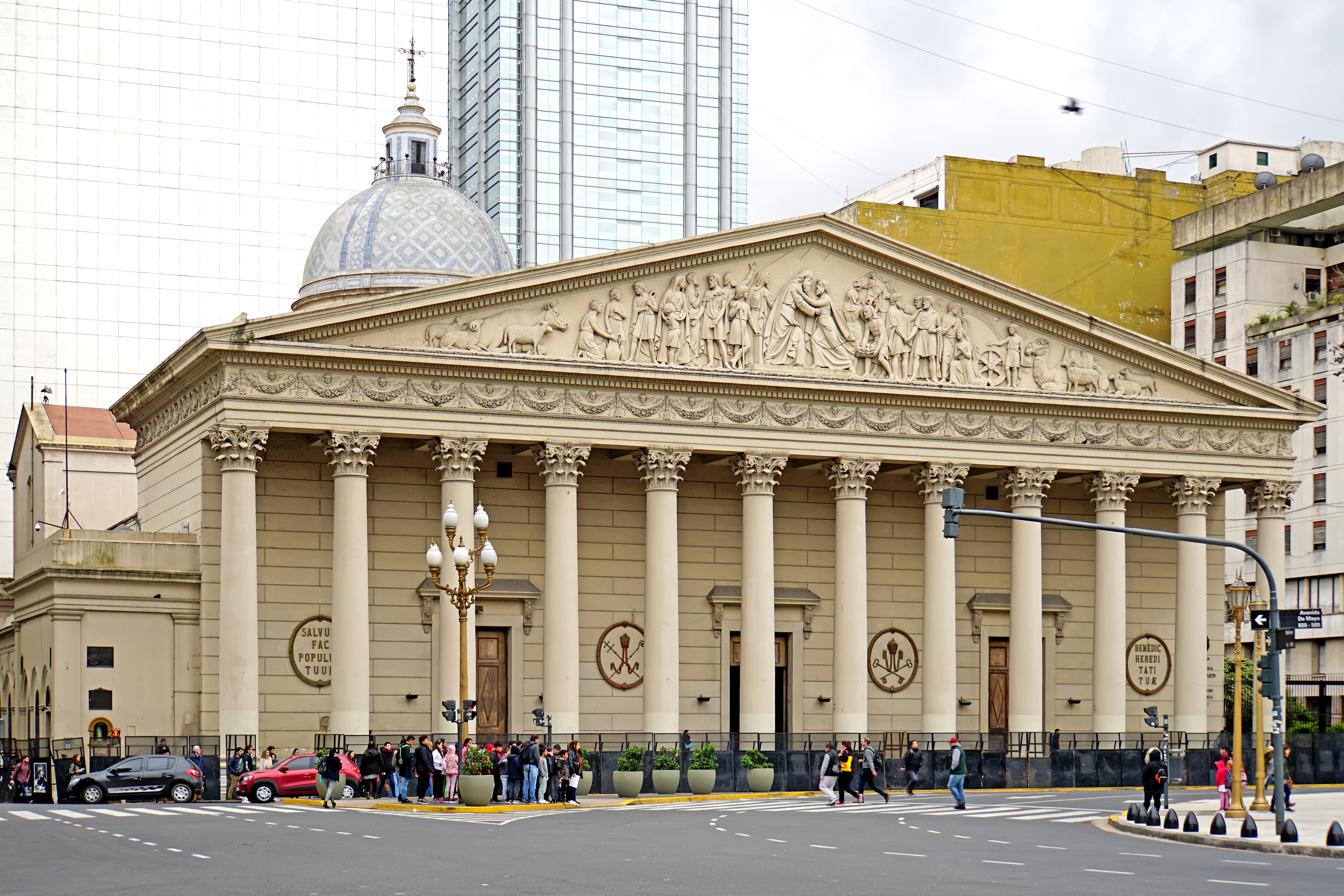
- Main facade of the cathedral, facing San Martín
- Buenos Aires Metropolitan Cathedral
- 34°36′27″S 58°22′24″W
- Location: San Martín 27, Buenos Aires
- Country: Argentina
- Denomination: Roman Catholic
- Website: catedralprimadabue.com

History
- Status: Cathedral
- Founded: 1593 (first chapel)
- Consecrated: 1779 (as a cathedral)

Architecture
- Functional status: Active
- Architects: Antonio Masella (1752); Próspero Catelin & Pedro Benoit (1822); Enrique Alberg (1877)
- Architectural type: Cathedral
- Style: Spanish Colonial Neoclassical
- Years built: 1754–1862
- Groundbreaking: 1754 (current structure)
- Completed: 1822; 204 years ago (Note: Except for the carving of the tympanum at top of the main facade, made in 1862.)

Administration
- Archdiocese: Buenos Aires (since 1822)

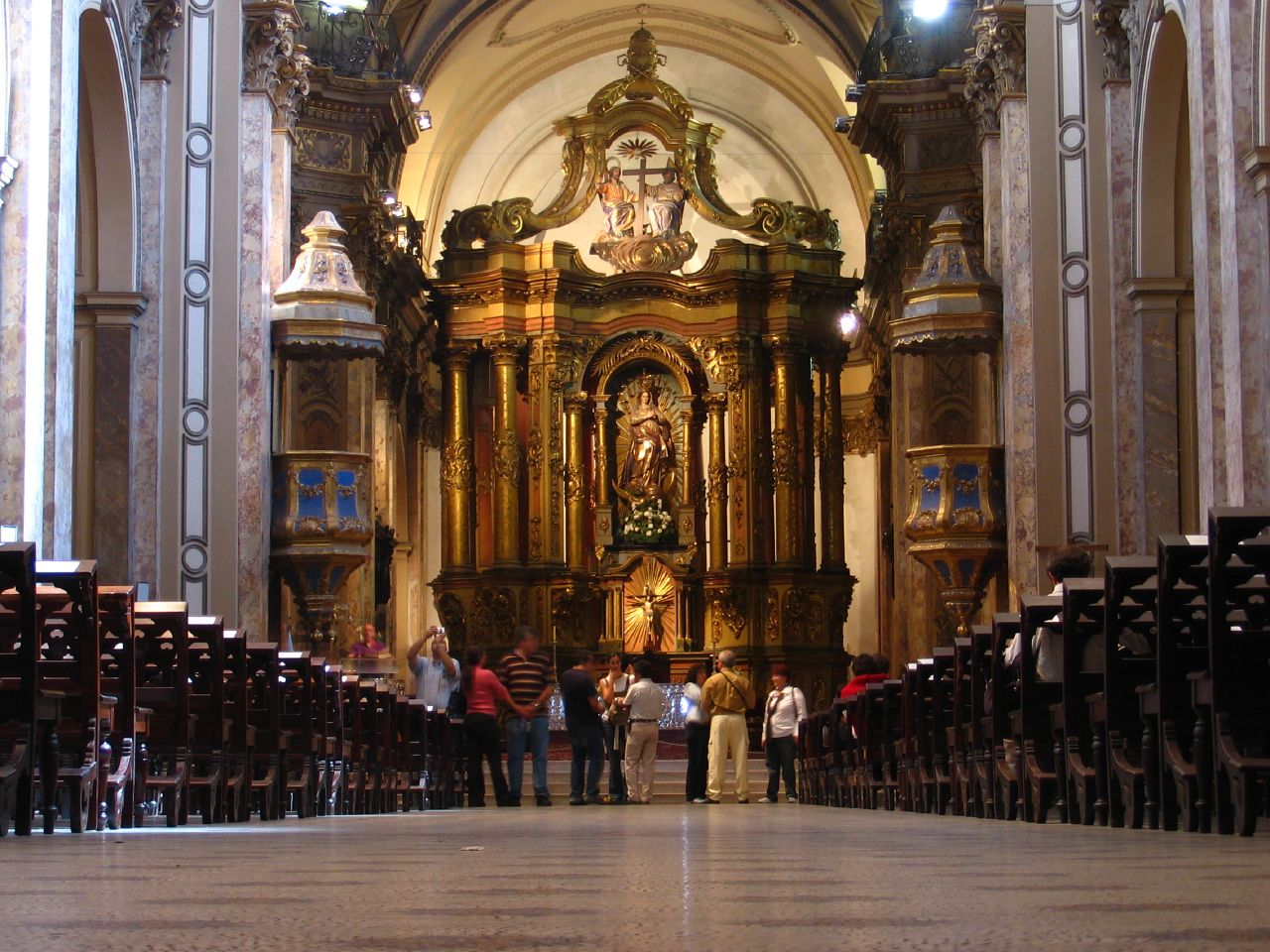
Altar inside the cathedral.

The Metropolitan Cathedral of the Most Holy Trinity of Buenos Aires (Spanish: Catedral Metropolitana de la Santísima Trinidad) is a Roman Catholic cathedral in Buenos Aires, the capital city of Argentina.

It is located in the city center, overlooking Plaza de Mayo, on the corner of San Martín and Rivadavia streets, in the San Nicolás neighbourhood. It is the mother church of the Archdiocese of Buenos Aires and held the rank of Primatial church of Argentina from 1822 to 2024. The cathedral was declared a National Historic Monument in 1942.

On 7 September 2024, the Santiago del Estero Cathedral was elevated to the rank of Primatial cathedral of Argentina in place of the Buenos Aires Metropolitan Cathedral. Pope Francis cited historical reasons for the transfer, as it was in Santiago del Estero that the first local diocese was created in 1570.

== History ==
=== First cathedral ===
When Juan de Garay arrived from Asunción to found the city of La Trinidad y Puerto de Buenos Aires on June 11, 1580, he set aside for the main church or cathedral the same quarter of a city block that it occupies today. Two brothers from the Jesuit Order, architect one and bricklayer the other completed this first cathedral, as well as several other religious buildings of this early city. In the act of foundation, made by Juan de Garay, it is read:

Being in this port of Santa María de Buenos Aires, which is in the Province of the Río de la Plata, again called Nueva Vizcaya, I make and found in the said seat and port a city, which 'local people' [translating 'pueblo'] with soldiers and people that I have and have brought for it, the church of which I put its dedication of the Holy Trinity, which is and will be the major parish church contained and marked in the square that I have made of the said city..."

Regarding the ecclesiastical jurisdiction, during this century the new city depended on, the diocese of the Río de la Plata (in today's Paraguay), created by Pope Paul III on July 1, 1547, with seat in Asunción.

The major parish church was a modest construction with adobe and wood walls, had two towers that gave the current Avenida Rivadavia the former name of Calle de las Torres, which in 1605 Governor Hernandarias ordered to demolish for being too old and indecent. We do not know what proportions would have the one that was built in its place with wood brought expressly from Paraguay. Years later, in 1616, its roof threatened to collapse and the parish, together with the Most Holy statue, had to move to the Church of San Fransico, and while projects were made to reform it, requesting for it the pecuniary contribution of the faithful, the church ended up collapsing because it was poorly built and with rotten willow wood. Neither the Cabildo, Justice and Regiment of the city lost heart and immediately chartered a ship to Paraguay to acquire and bring the necessary wood for the rebuilding of the temple. The work began in January 1618. According to the budget of Pascual Ramírez, who would carry out the work, the cost would be 1,100 pesos. We do not have exact information on the collection of the money, but we do know that by the end of that same year the work on the church was finished. The problem, however, was that it was smaller than the previous one, so much so that in 1621 there was already talk of building another one to be used as a cathedral.

In the meantime, in Madrid and in Rome, the procedures for the creation of the Diocese of Buenos Aires were being carried out. The bull of canonical erection of this church as cathedral by Pope Paul V is dated April 6, 1620 and its execution took place on June 26, 1622, by its first bishop, the Carmelite friar Pedro Carranza, in a solemn meeting with the authorities and the people, which means that on that date he took possession of the diocese. The bishop in his letter of May 4 of that same year he wrote to the king:

"It is so indecent (the cathedral) that in Spain there are places in the fields of shepherds and cattle more comfortable and clean; in the church there is no sacristy, but an old, short and indecent one of reeds, raining all over itself, with a great poverty of ornaments." "The Blessed Sacrament is in a rough and poorly standing wooden box." "And as far as the building is corcerned, it is necessary to board it up and accommodate it, otherwise it will all fall to the ground and we will go to a convent church to make cathedral".

=== Second cathedral ===
When the third bishop of Buenos Aires, Friar Cristóbal de la Mancha y Velazco arrived at his see on October 6, 1641, he found the cathedral, if not in a ruinous state, at least very deteriorated. So he immediately conceived the idea of building a new cathedral and communicated it to the king on November 19, 1662. According to the plan he enclosed, the temple was to have three naves; for its construction, 5,000 pesos would be needed, a sum he requested from the royal treasury. In the person of the excellent governor Don José Martínez de Salazar, the bishop found someone who would collaborate in the construction of the temple not only with his influence, but even with money of his own. In 1671 the cathedral was finished, it consisted of three naves, a wooden roof and a tower, it was of regular proportions.

But behold, a work with so many appearances of solidity, after seven years, because of the inferior quality of some materials used in its construction, began to show signs of its inevitable ruin. This is the second cathedral.

Due to the bad quality of its building materials, the tower and the roof of this church fell down in the early 1680s. The whole church was again rebuilt, starting in 1684, under bishop Azcona Imberto. In 1695 the building was almost finished, with the flanking towers of the façade and the sacristy still to be completed.

In the early 18th century the works were slow, and the first tower was finished only around 1721. The second tower was begun in 1722 and finished around 1725. The main façade was redesigned between 1725 and 1727 by the Italian Jesuit Giovanni Bianchi (also spelled Blanqui). The design of the new façade was directly inspired by Italian Mannerist architecture.

=== Definitive building ===
On the night of May 23, 1752, the nave of the cathedral collapsed. The only portions still standing were the façade and towers, but the rest of the building needed to be completely rebuilt once again. Italian architect Antonio Masella was put in charge of the project, and the works began already in 1753. Masella designed a majestic church, much larger than the previous structure, with a three-aisled nave covered with barrel vaulting and lateral chapels. A dome was to sit over the crossing. Upon completion of the dome, however, fissures in the structure were detected and it had to be rebuilt. Masella was removed from the project and prosecuted by the authorities, although later acquitted.

The dome was rebuilt by Portuguese architect Manuel Álvarez de Rocha after 1770. The façade by Blanqui and the towers were finally demolished in 1778, since they were too small in comparison to the scale of the new cathedral. An elegant project for a new façade with two flanking towers, combining Rococo and Neoclassical elements, was presented by the Portuguese military engineer José Custódio de Sá e Faria, but financial constraints prevented the realisation of the project. The cathedral was consecrated in 1779 without façade.

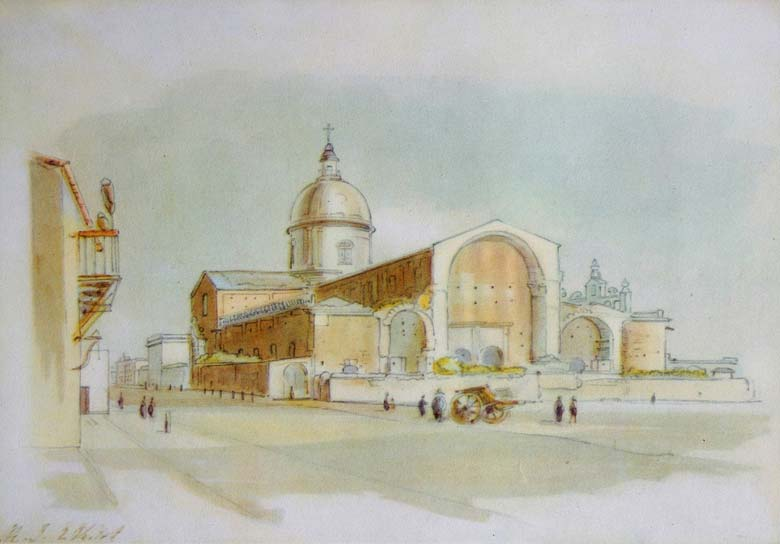
The Cathedral before its definitive look, as seen in a 1817 watercolor

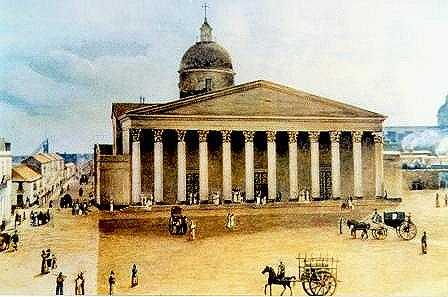
The cathedral with the neoclasical facade designed in 1822. Painting by Charles Pellegrini, 1829

Construction of a façade began in the early 19th century directed by Spanish architect Tomás Toribio, but the project did not advance much. It was only in 1821, under Governor Martín Rodríguez and his Minister Bernardino Rivadavia, that plans to complete the cathedral were taken seriously. Starting in 1826, French architects Prosper Catelin and Pierre Benoit built a new Neoclassical façade for the cathedral inspired by the Palais Bourbon in Paris. Construction was temporarily halted in 1827, and when it resumed, progress was slow until its final completion. The façade of the building consists of a tall portico, inspired by Classical architecture, with twelve columns and a triangular pediment on top. The portico lends the building the appearance of an ancient temple rather than a Catholic church. The original project did not call for towers to be built and, even though there were later plans to build two towers, they were never materialized.

The decoration of the façade was only finished between 1860 and 1863, when French sculptor Joseph Dubourdieu created the reliefs of the pediment. The scene represents the reunion of Joseph with his brothers and father Jacob in Egypt, and was intended as an allegory of the unity of the Argentine nation after several fratricide wars. Dubourdieu also completed the Corinthian capitals of the columns of the portico.

== Interior ==
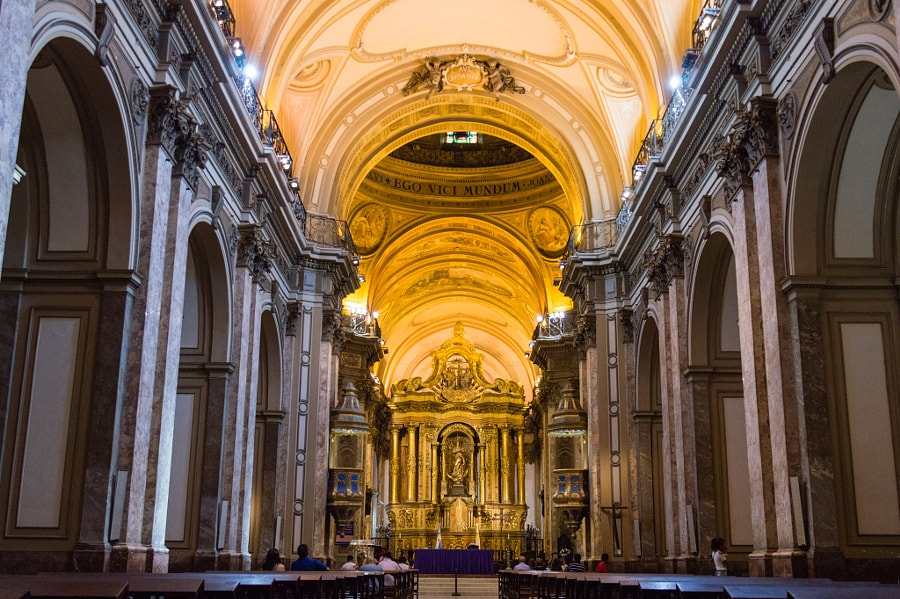
Main nave

The Cathedral of Buenos Aires is a Latin cross building with transept and three-aisles with side chapels connected by corridors. Originally the interior was only decorated with altarpieces, but at the end of the 19th century the walls and ceilings of the church were decorated with frescoes depicting biblical scenes painted the Italian Francesco Paolo Parisi. In 1907, the floor of the cathedral was covered with Venetian-style mosaics designed by the Italian Carlo Morra. Repair work for the entire floor was started in 2004 and completed in 2010.

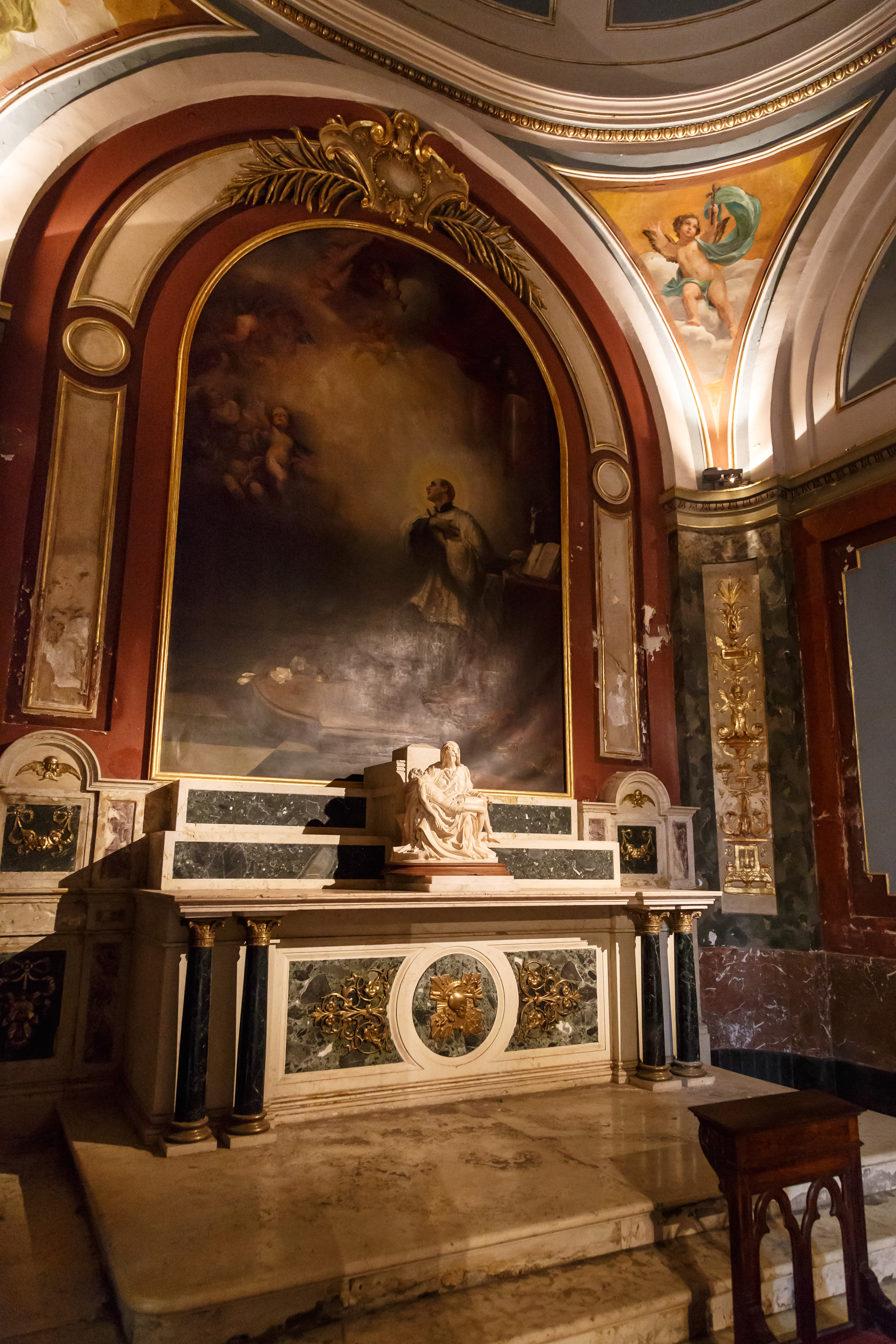
San Luis Gonzaga chapel

The cathedral still has some elements dating from colonial times. The most important is the main gilt wood altarpiece in Rococo style, dating from 1785 and executed by Spanish sculptor Isidro Lorea. The altarpiece occupies the main chapel and has a statue of the Virgin Mary and a representation of the Holy Trinity in its canopy.

Another notable colonial sculpture is the Christ of Buenos Aires, a large image of the crucified Christ located in the altarpiece of the lateral arm of the transept. The statue was carved by Portuguese sculptor Manuel do Coyto in 1671 and is the oldest in the cathedral. According to the faithful, it has miraculously saved the city from a flood in the 18th century.

The two pulpits of the cathedral, in transitional Rococo-Neoclassical style, were created in 1789–1790 by the Spanish sculptor Juan Antonio Gaspar Hernández, who would later (1799) direct the first art school of Buenos Aires.

An 1871 Walcker organ (Opus 263) is at the chorus section. It has more than 3500 pipes, and was made in Germany with the finest materials available at that time. Titular Organist is Mr. Enrique Rimoldi, who offers periodically organ concerts for free. This organ is quite well conserved and its intonation was preserved as close as possible to the original. It is currently recognised as one of the finest Walcker Organs ever manufactured.

The Cathedral itself can also be considered as a pictorial museum, for example the Calvarium or stations of the cross, always present in a Catholic Church, consist of 14 magnificent pictures, made "al óleo", this is, with oil painting and traditional canvas, all originals, with dimensions of more than 1.5 by 1 metre (4 ft 11 in by 3 ft 3 in) each.

=== Mausoleum of General San Martín ===
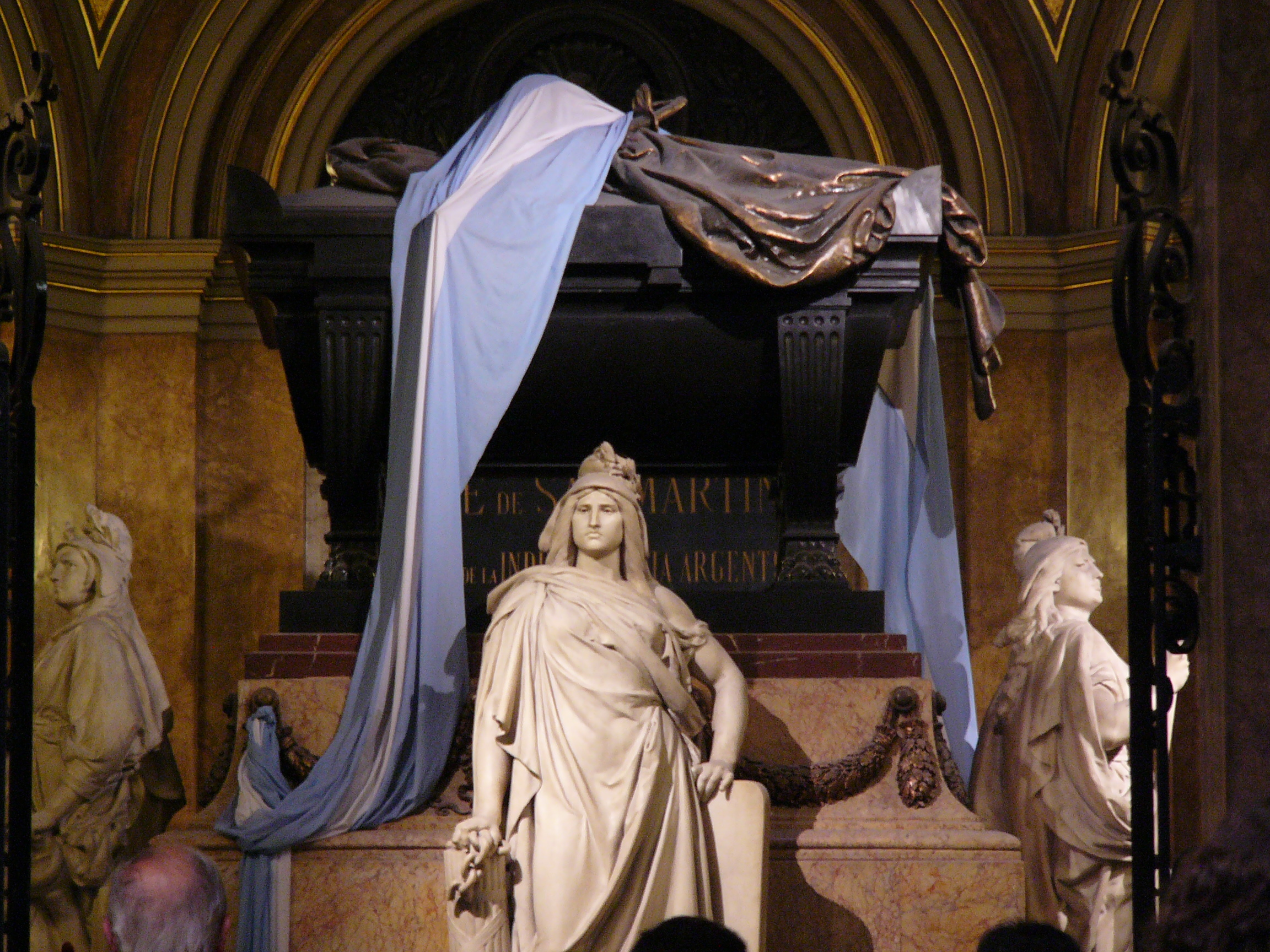
Mausoleum of General San Martín guarded by statues representing Argentina, Peru and Chile

In 1880, the remains of General José de San Martín were brought from France and placed in a mausoleum, reachable from the right aisle of the church. The mausoleum was specially designed by French sculptor Albert-Ernest Carrier-Belleuse, with marble of various colours. The black sarcophagus is guarded by three life-size female figures that represent Argentina, Chile and Peru, three of the regions freed by the General. The mausoleum also has the remains of Generals Juan Gregorio de las Heras and Tomás Guido, as well as those of the Unknown Soldier of the Independence.

== Pope Francis ==
Pope Francis was the Archbishop of Buenos Aires for 15 years. Then known as Archbishop Jorge Bergoglio, he used to celebrate mass at this cathedral before moving to the Vatican in 2013. The cathedral houses the Pope Francis Museum, established in 2013, which holds some of his personal and liturgical objects.

== Gallery ==
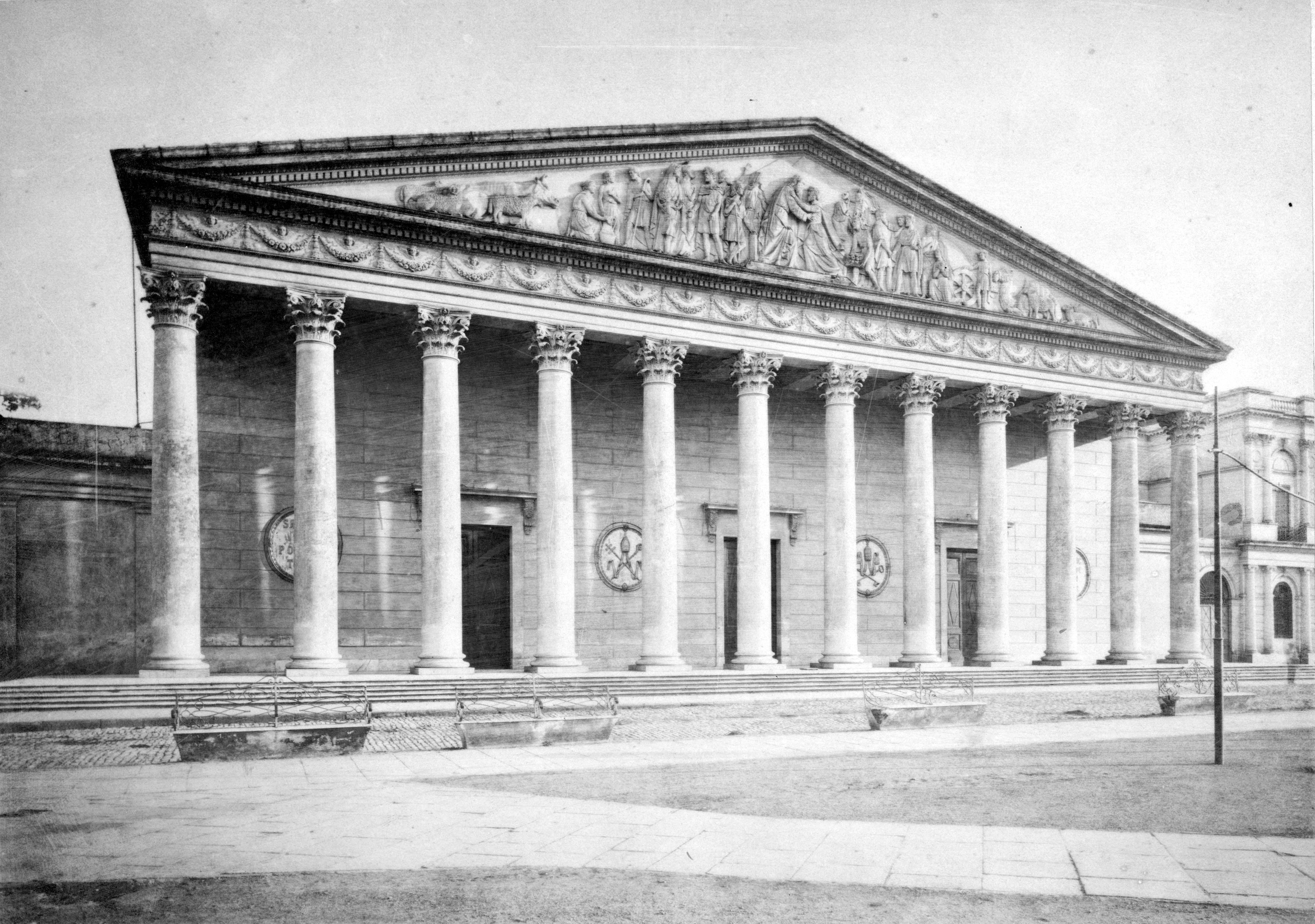
The cathedral as seen in 1876 by Christiano Junior

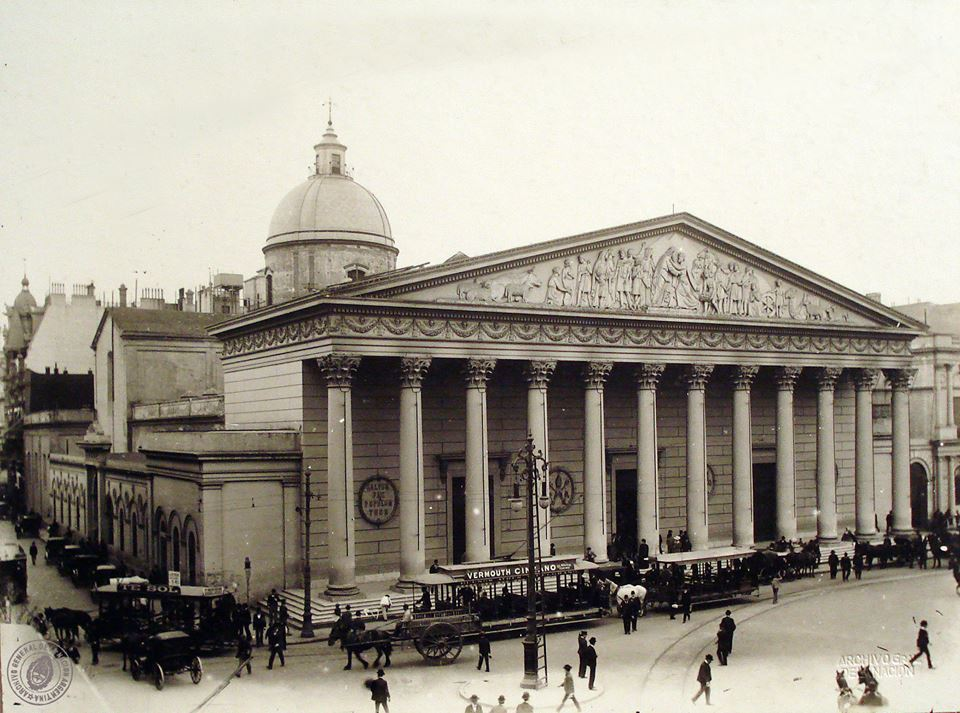
Main façade in 1899, with the dome finished

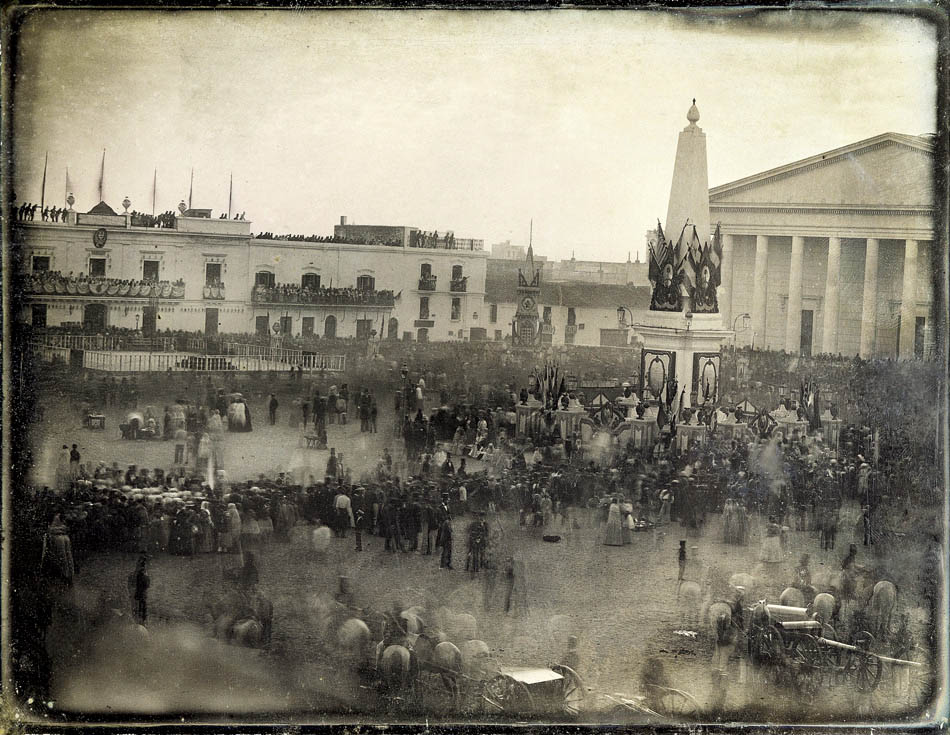
The cathedral (right) in 1854

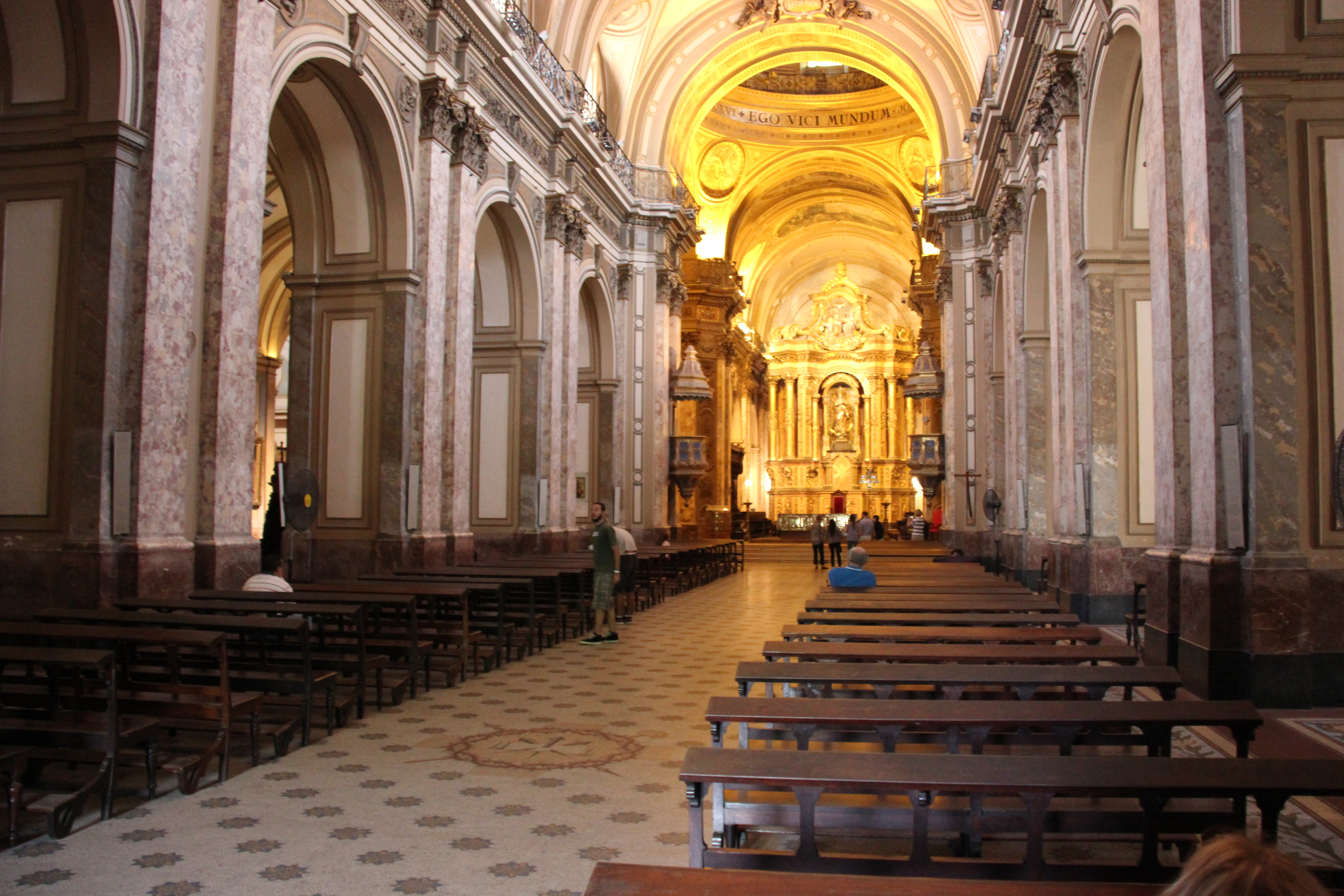
Interior viewed towards the main chapel

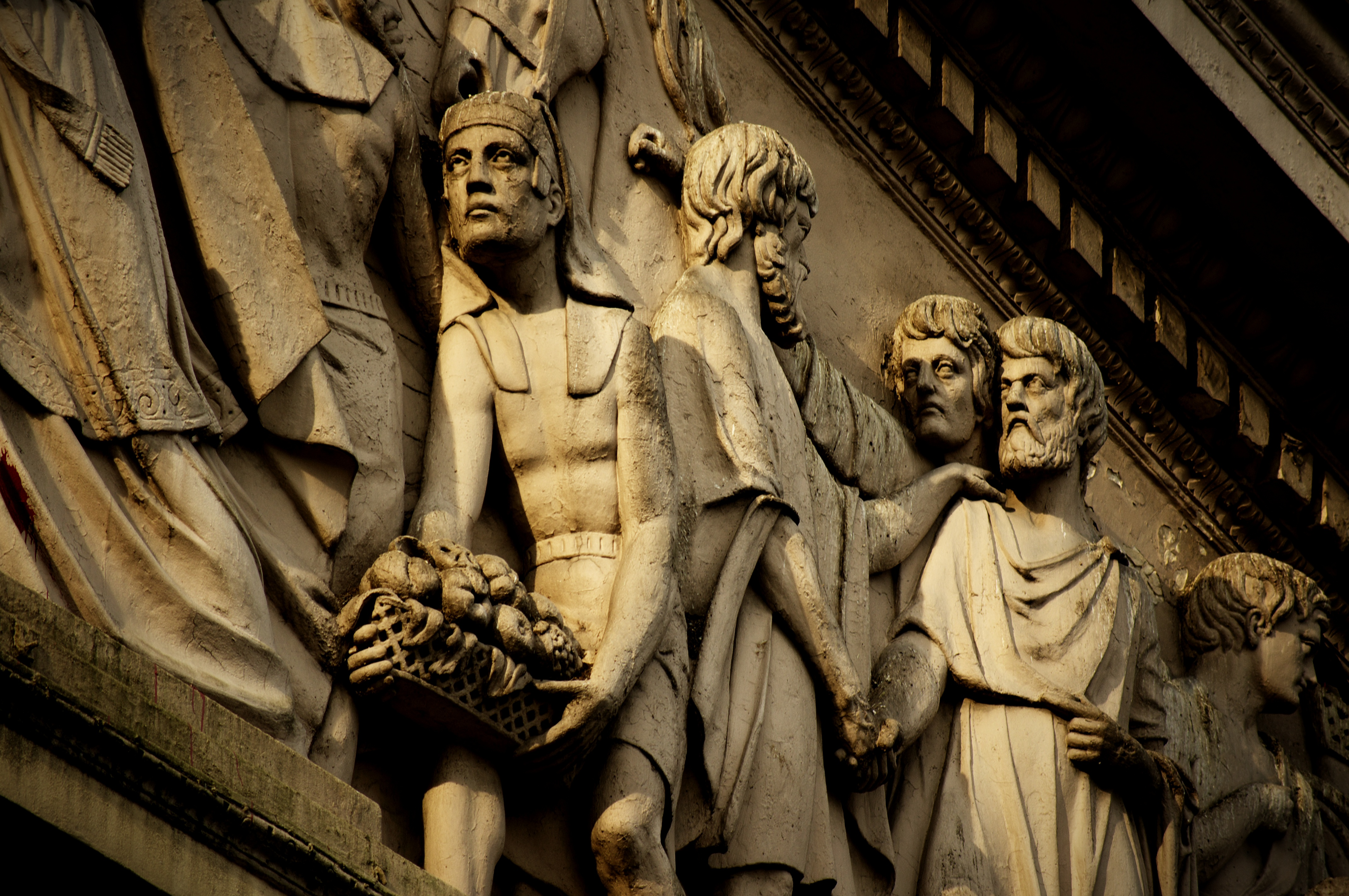
Frieze

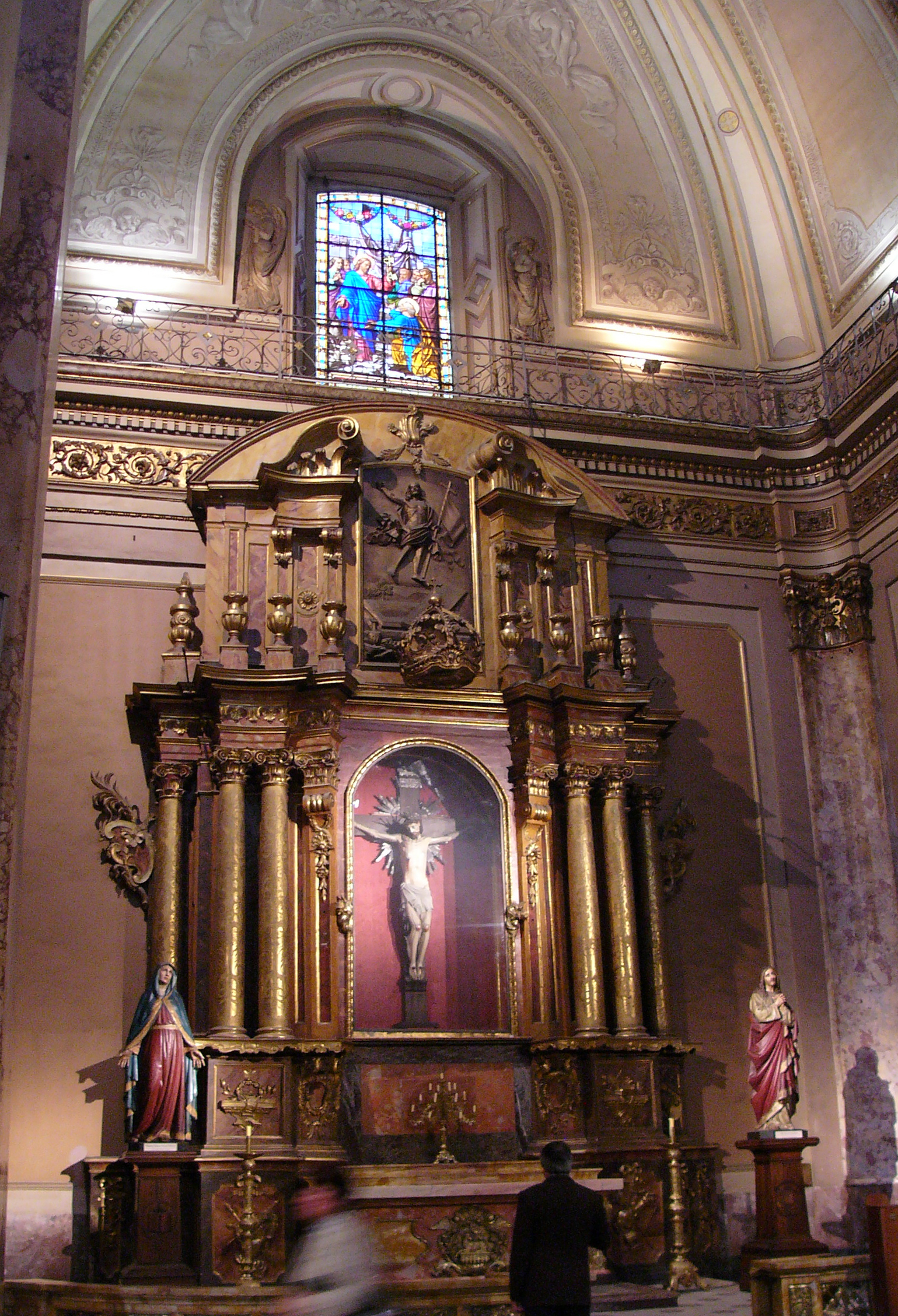
Altarpiece of the lateral transept arm

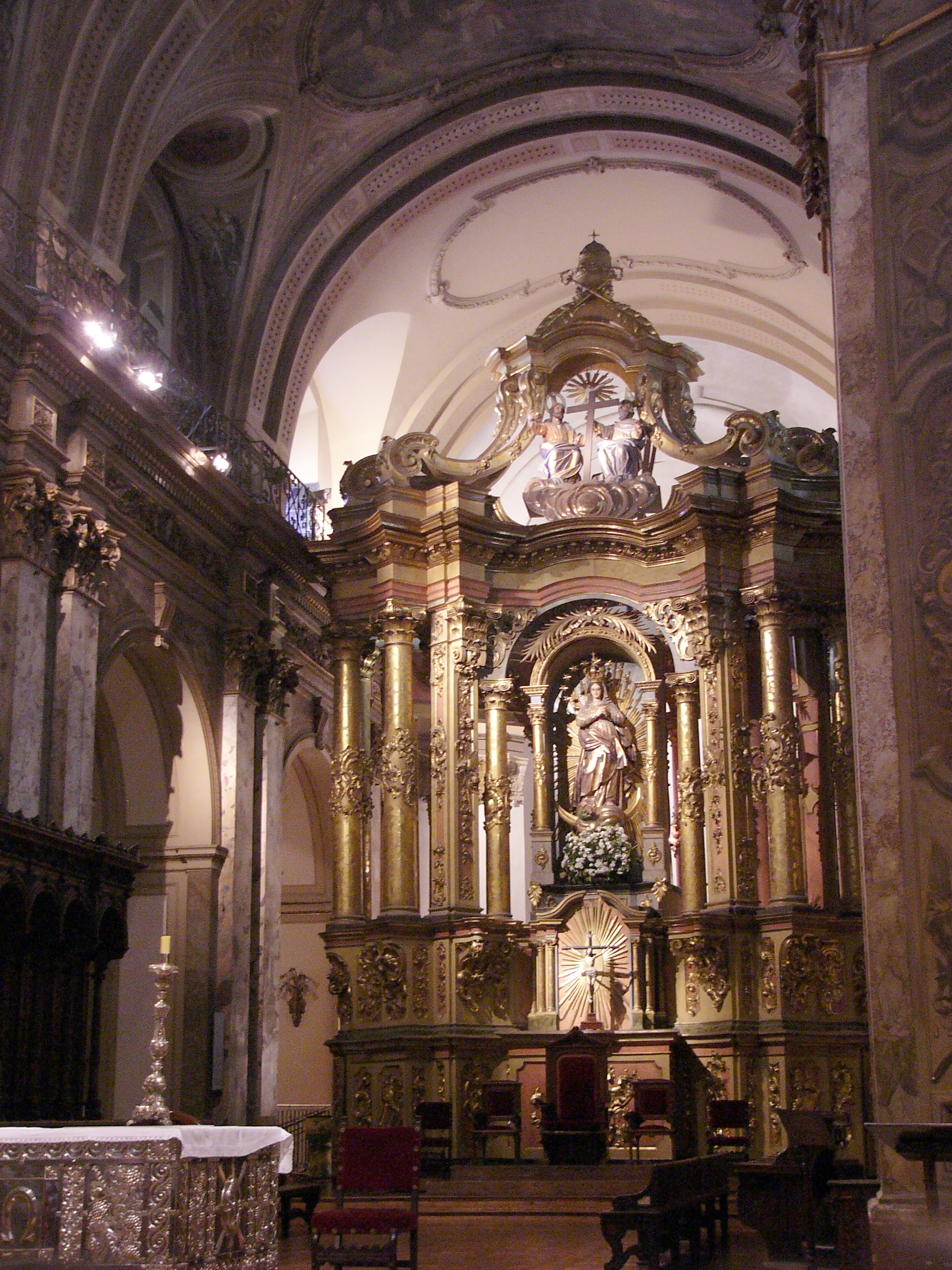
Main altarpiece by Isidro Lorea (1785)

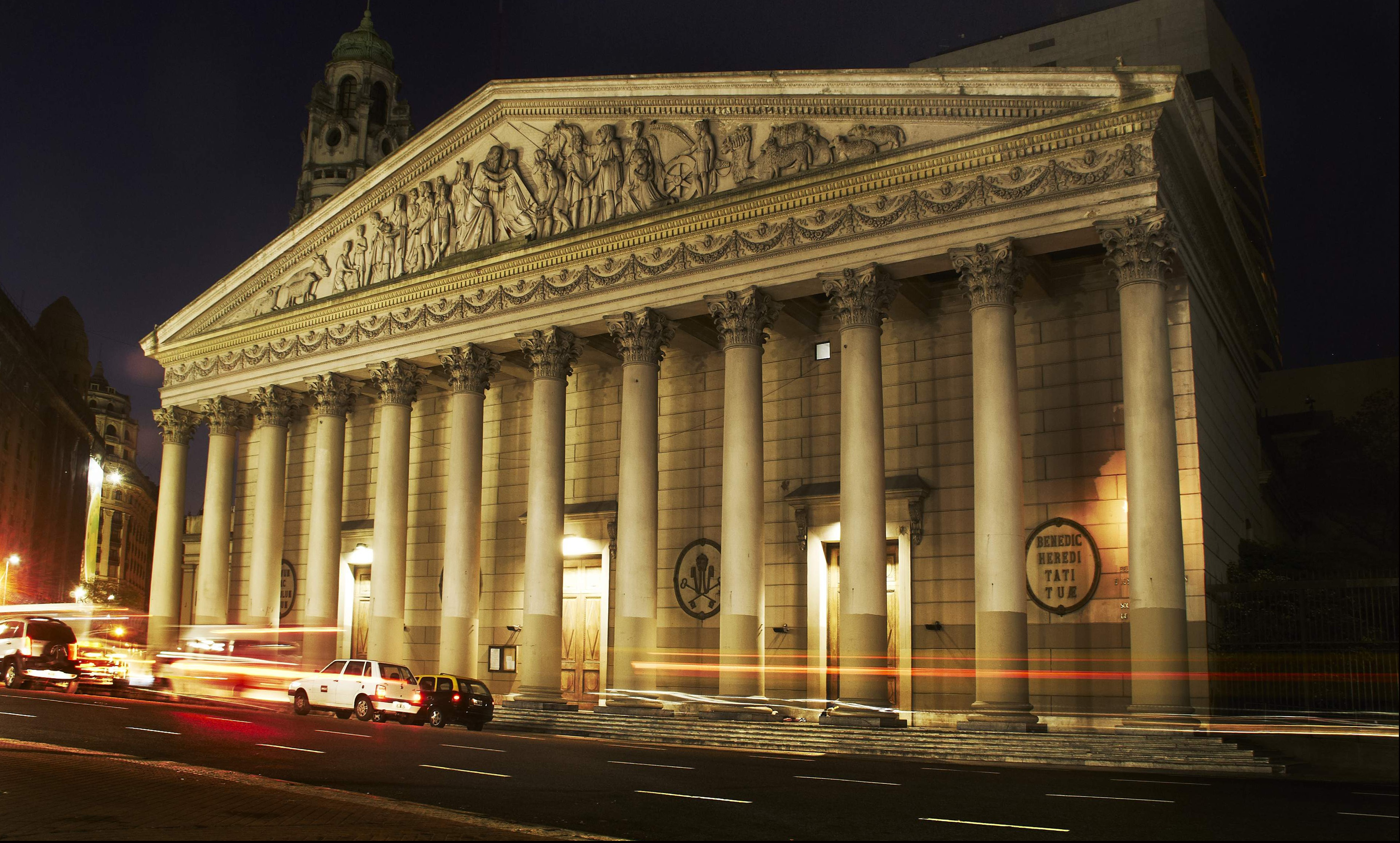
The Cathedral at night (2012)

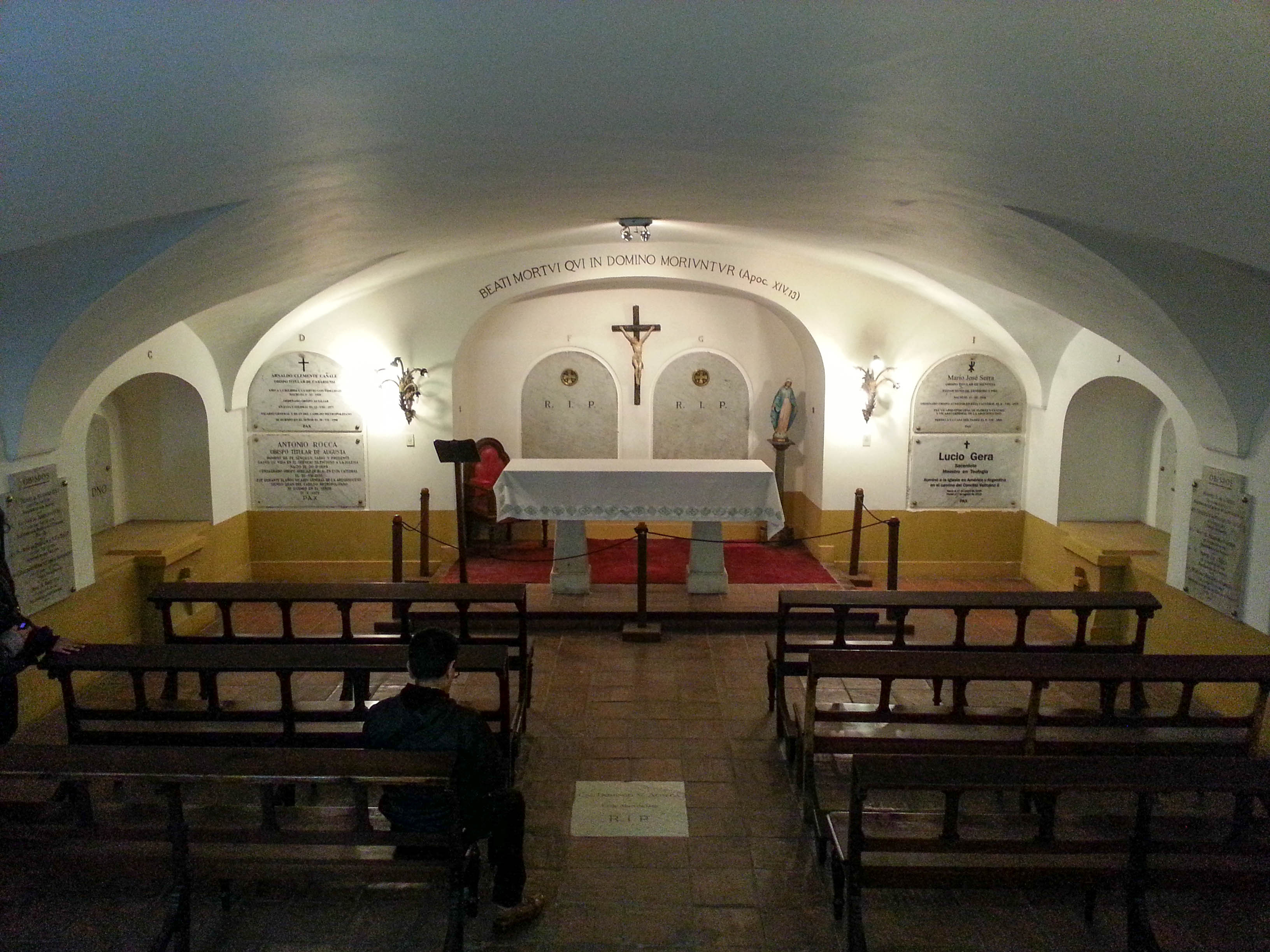
Crypt

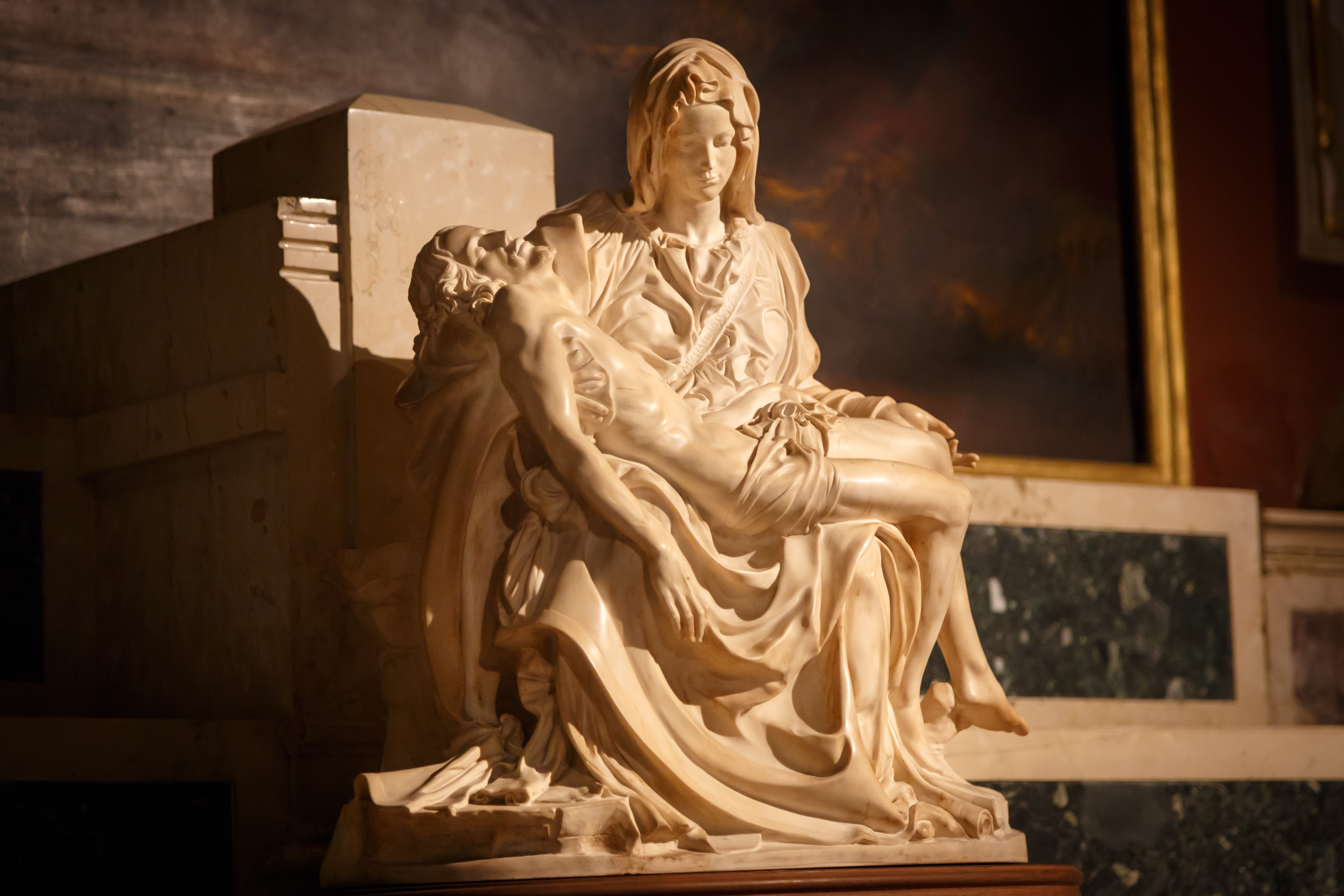
Detail of San Luis Gonzaga chapel

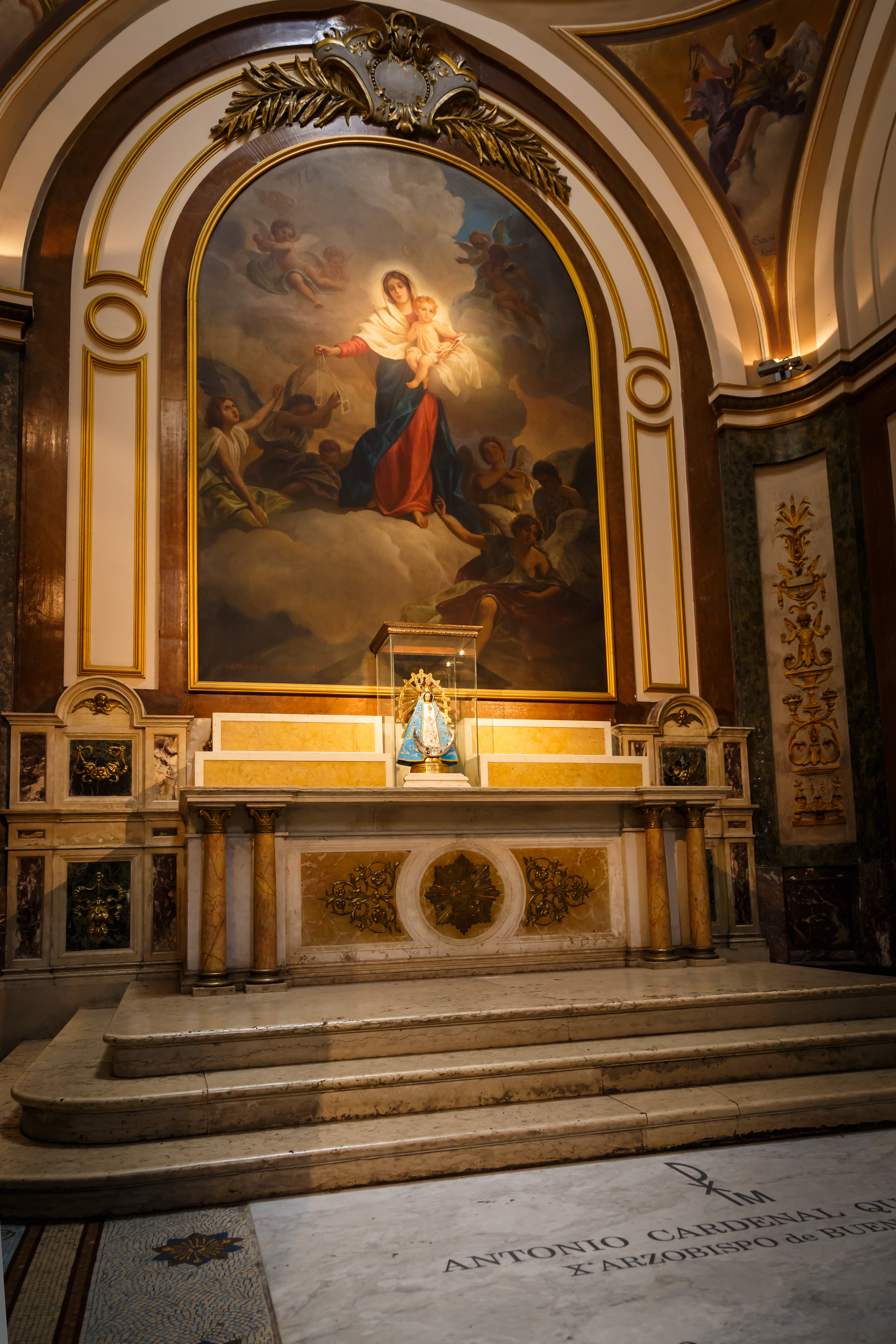
Nuestra Señora del Carmen chapel

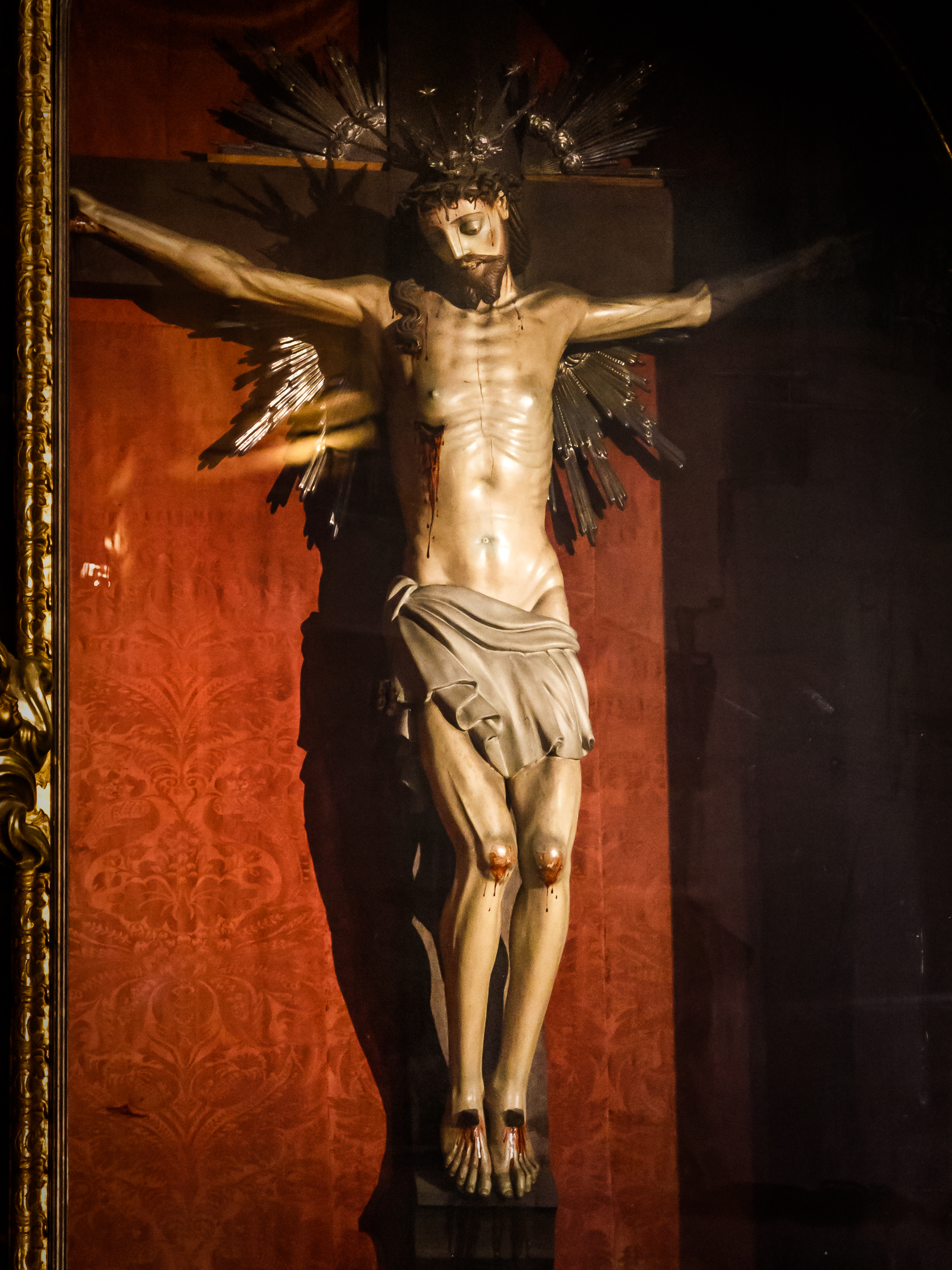
Altar of Cristo de los Buenos Aires

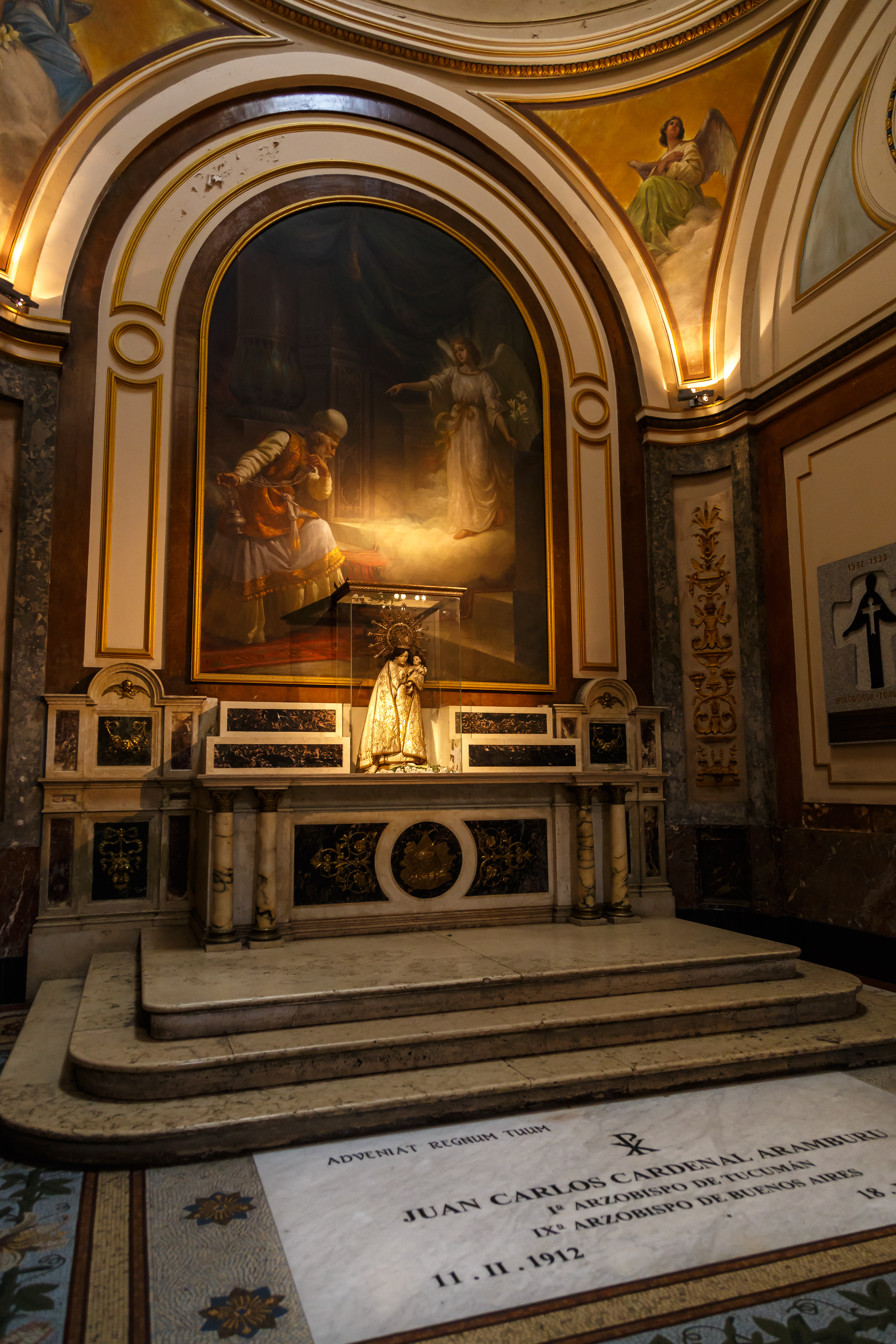
San Juan Bautista chapel

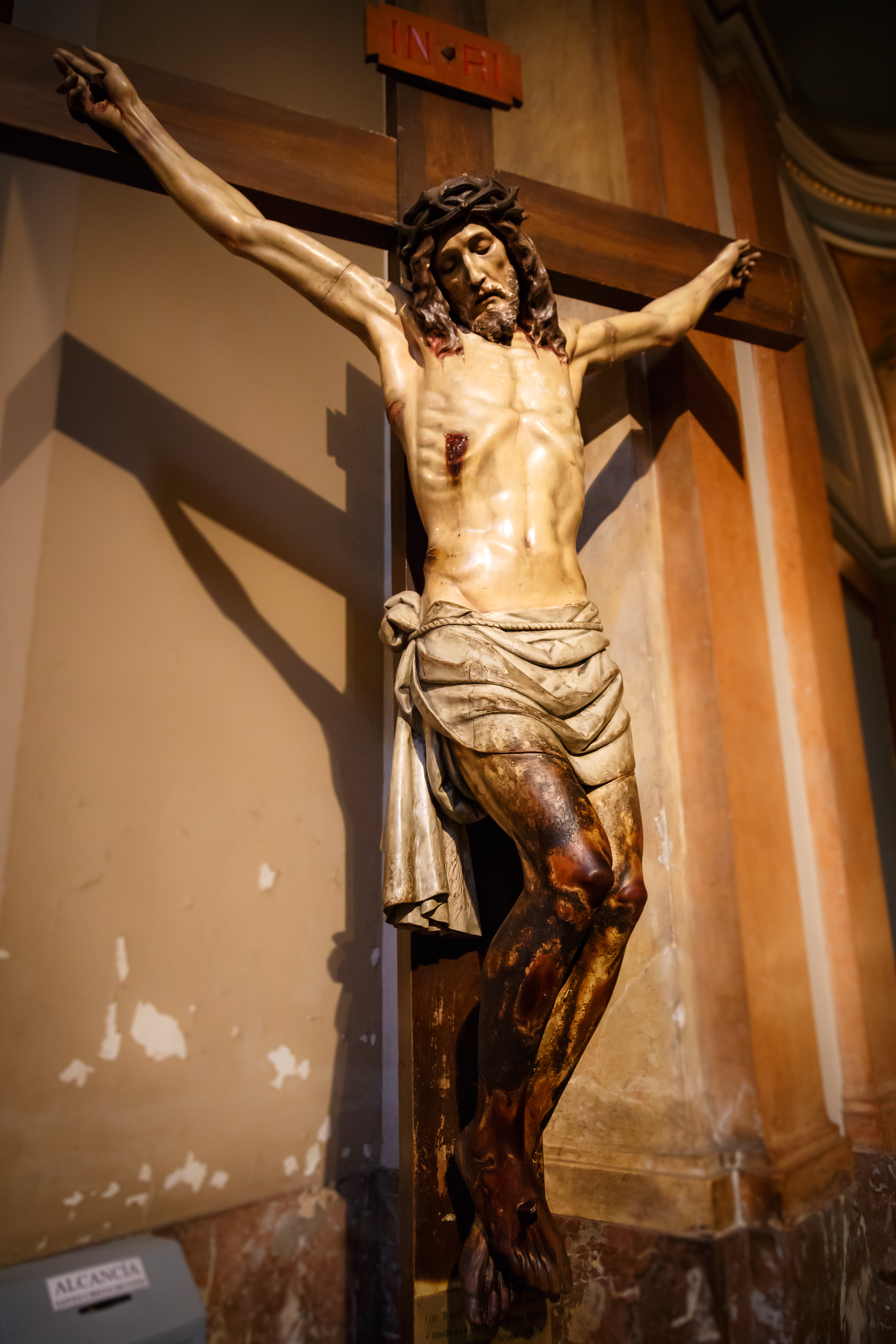
Devote Christ

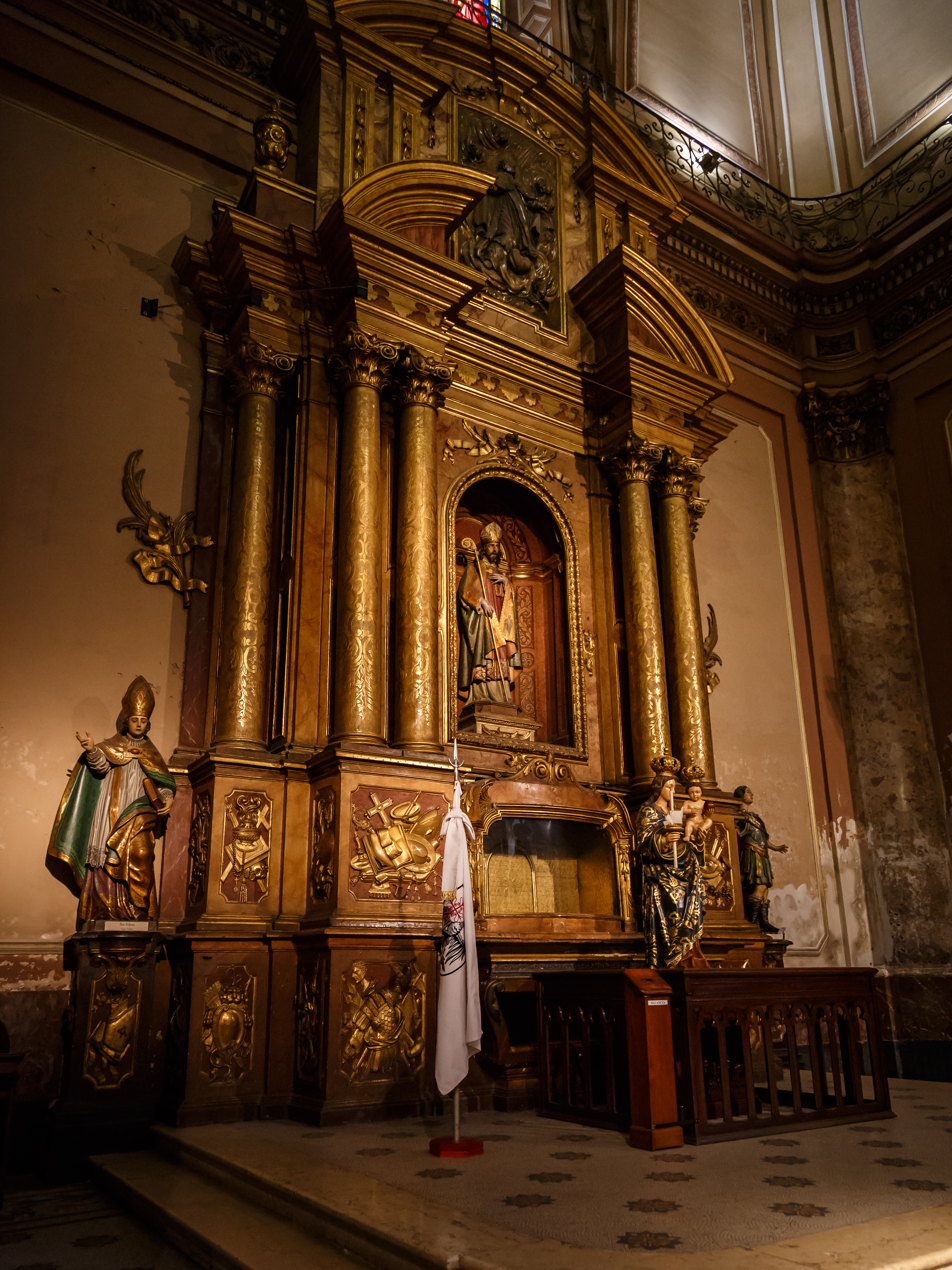
Altarpiece of San Martín de Tours

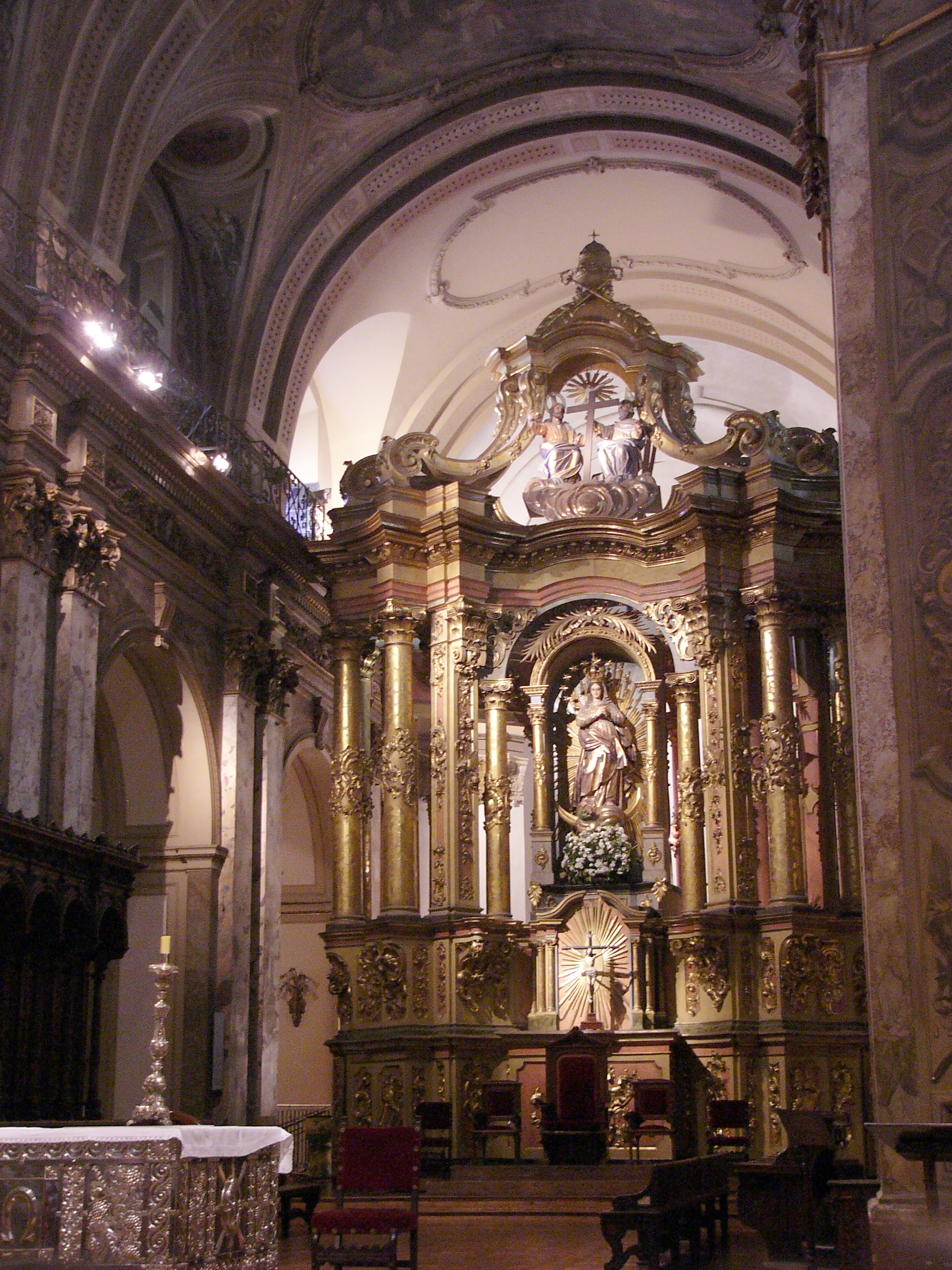
Main altarpiece

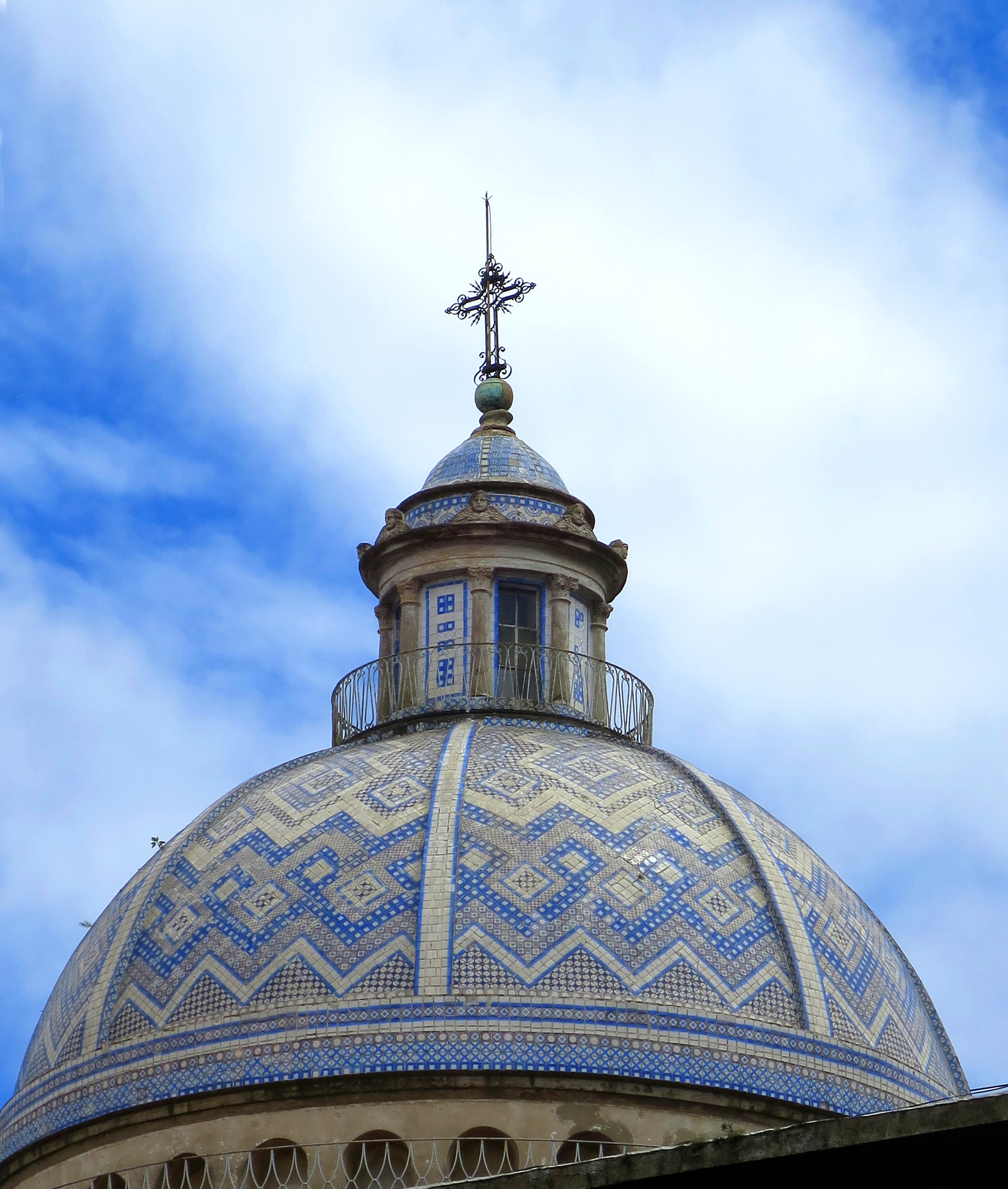
Exterior view of the dome

== See also ==
- Plaza de Mayo
- Religion in Argentina
- Roman Catholicism in Argentina
- Architecture of Argentina
- Archdiocese of Buenos Aires
- Hotel Majestic (Buenos Aires)
