= Francesco Parisi =

Francesco Parisi may refer to:

- Francesco Parisi (economist) (born 1962), Italian legal scholar and economist
- Francesco Parisi (painter) (1857–1948), Italian-Argentine painter
- Francesco Parisi (politician) (1930–2016), Italian politician
