= Avenida de Mayo =

Avenue in Buenos Aires, Argentina

Coordinates: 34°36′32″S 58°22′43″W

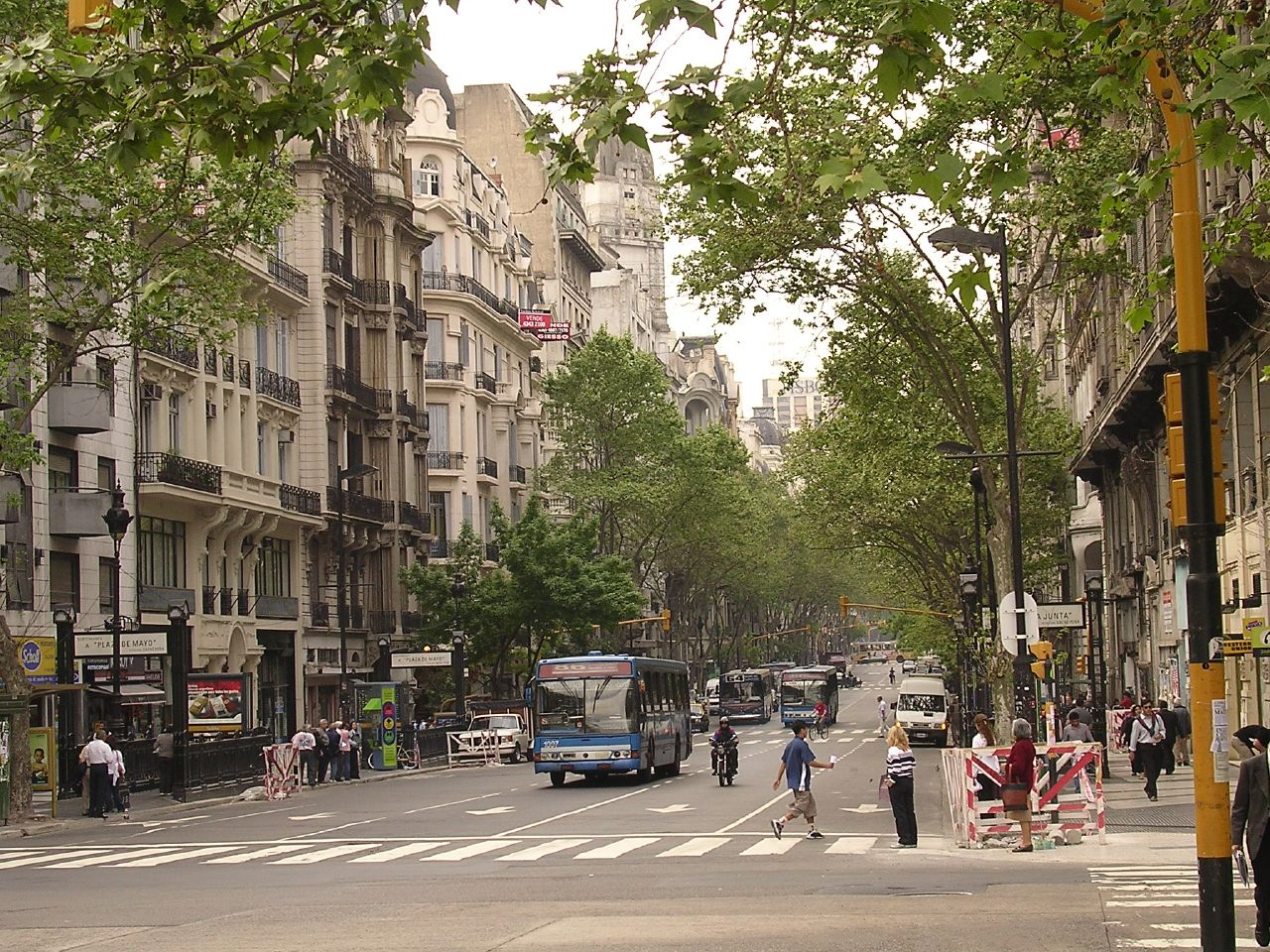
May Avenue

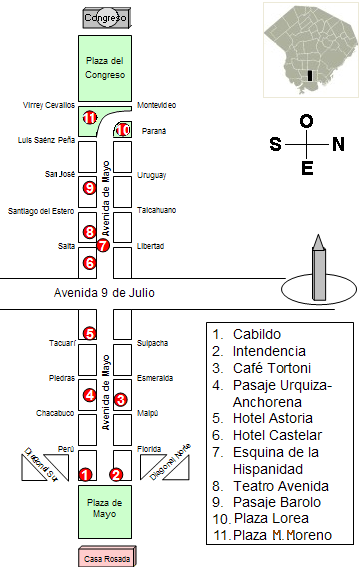
Map of the avenue

May Avenue (Spanish: Avenida de Mayo) is an avenue in Buenos Aires, capital of Argentina. It connects the Plaza de Mayo with Congressional Plaza, and extends 1.5 km (0.93 mi) in a west–east direction before merging into Rivadavia Avenue.

== History and overview ==
Built on an initiative by Mayor Torcuato de Alvear, work began in 1885 and was completed in 1894. The avenue is often compared with La Gran Vía in Madrid, although the Spanish avenue was built later (1910). It is also compared to those in Paris or Barcelona due to its sophisticated buildings of Art Nouveau, neoclassic and eclectic styles. The avenue was named in honor of the May Revolution of 1810 (the event that led to Argentine Independence). The site of the assembly that touched off the revolution (the Buenos Aires Cabildo) was partially demolished in 1888 to make way for the avenue's entry into Plaza de Mayo. The avenue's layout, built through existing urban blocks instead of via the widening of a parallel street, was designed by the municipal public works director, Juan Antonio Buschiazzo. Buschiazzo was also commissioned to design a number of the buildings along the avenue (among them, City Hall) after Mayor Miguel Cané enacted strict architectural zoning laws for the area facing the new thoroughfare. The recession caused by the Panic of 1890 led to delays and a rollback of many of the more ornate plans for the avenue, which was inaugurated on July 9, 1894 (the 78th anniversary of Independence).

Mayor Cané's strict regulations initially governed architecture along the 30 m (99 ft)-wide avenue, which limited the height of real estate facing it to 24 m (79 ft). The Barolo Tower was the first to be granted an exception to this and since then, numerous office buildings have been built in excess of these stipulations (though they remain largely an exception). The Avenida de Mayo was the site of the first Buenos Aires Metro stations; opened in 1913, these were the first outside the United States or Europe. The avenue itself underwent its only significant alteration in 1937, when one block were demolished to make way for the perpendicular Avenida 9 de Julio (the widest in the world). Seeking to halt future demolitions along the avenue, Decree 437/97 of the National Executive Branch declared the Avenue a National Historic Site in 1997 and, as a result, the aesthetics of the buildings, billboards, and marquees could not be changed. Any modifications must be approved by the National Commission of Monuments and Historic Sites (Comisión Nacional de Monumentos y Lugares Históricos).

== Gallery ==
Architectural treasures in Avenida de Mayo

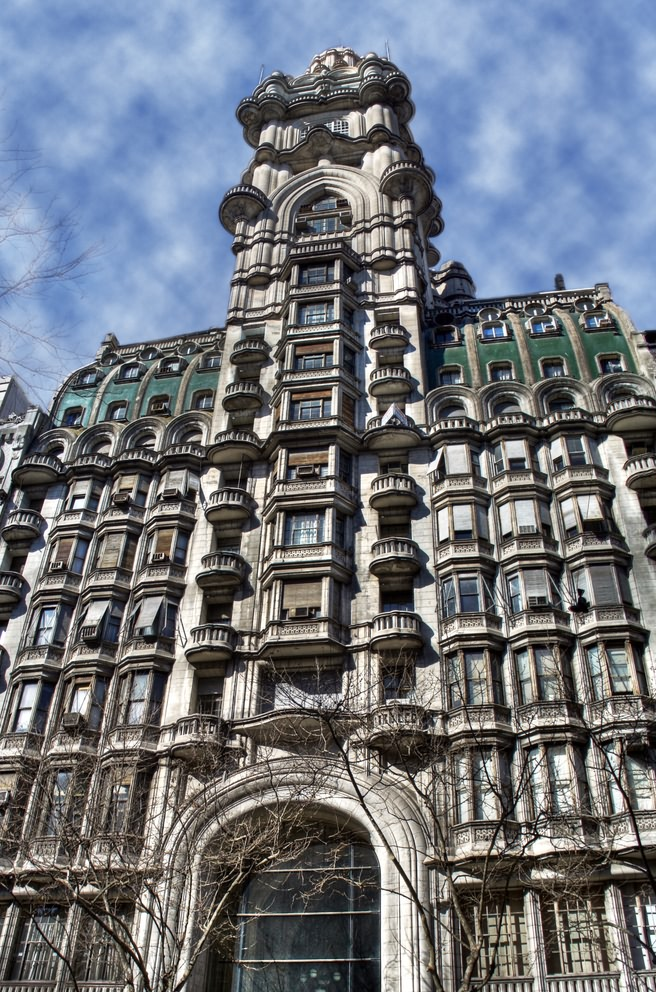
Palacio Barolo

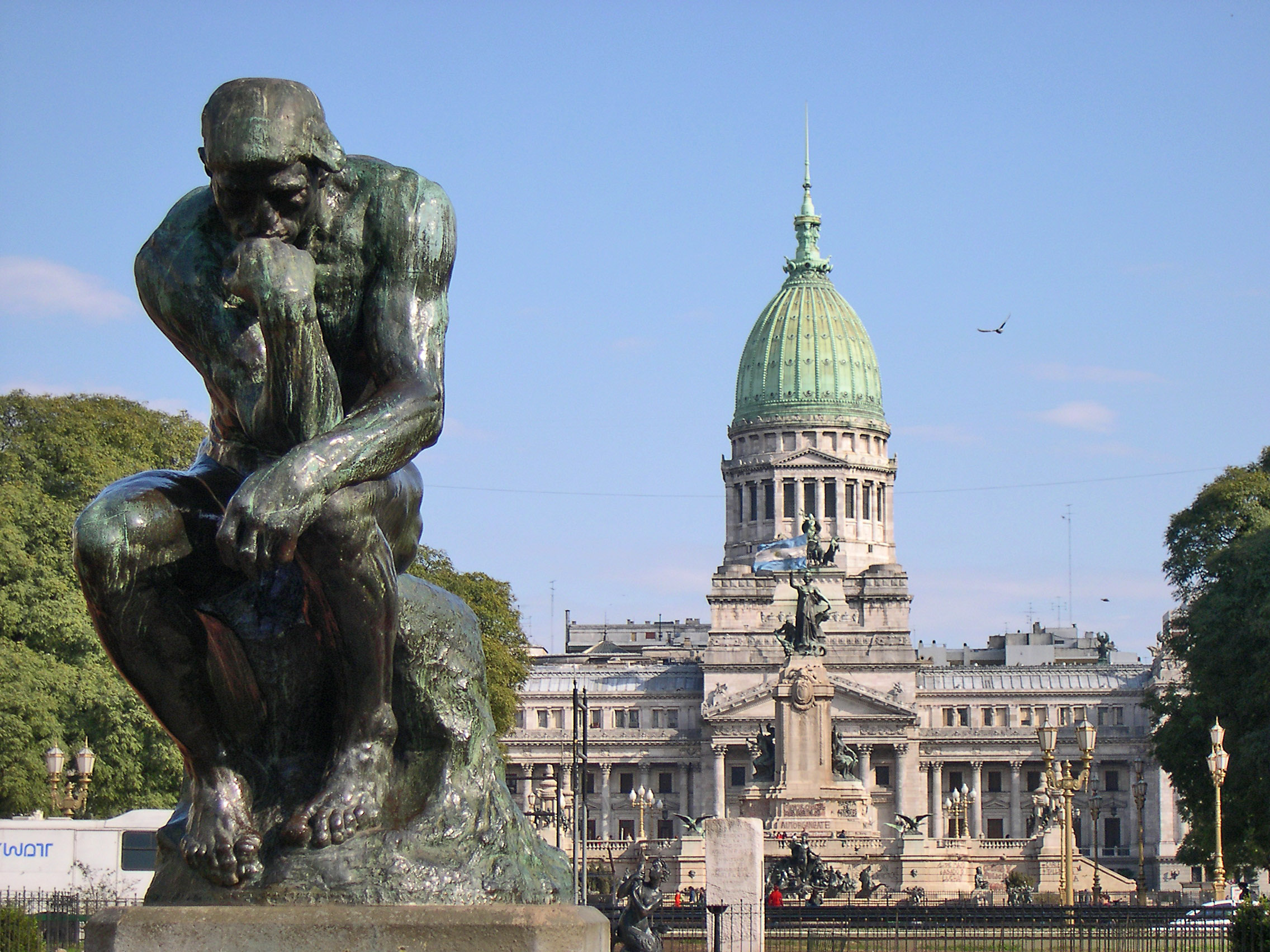
Congressional Plaza

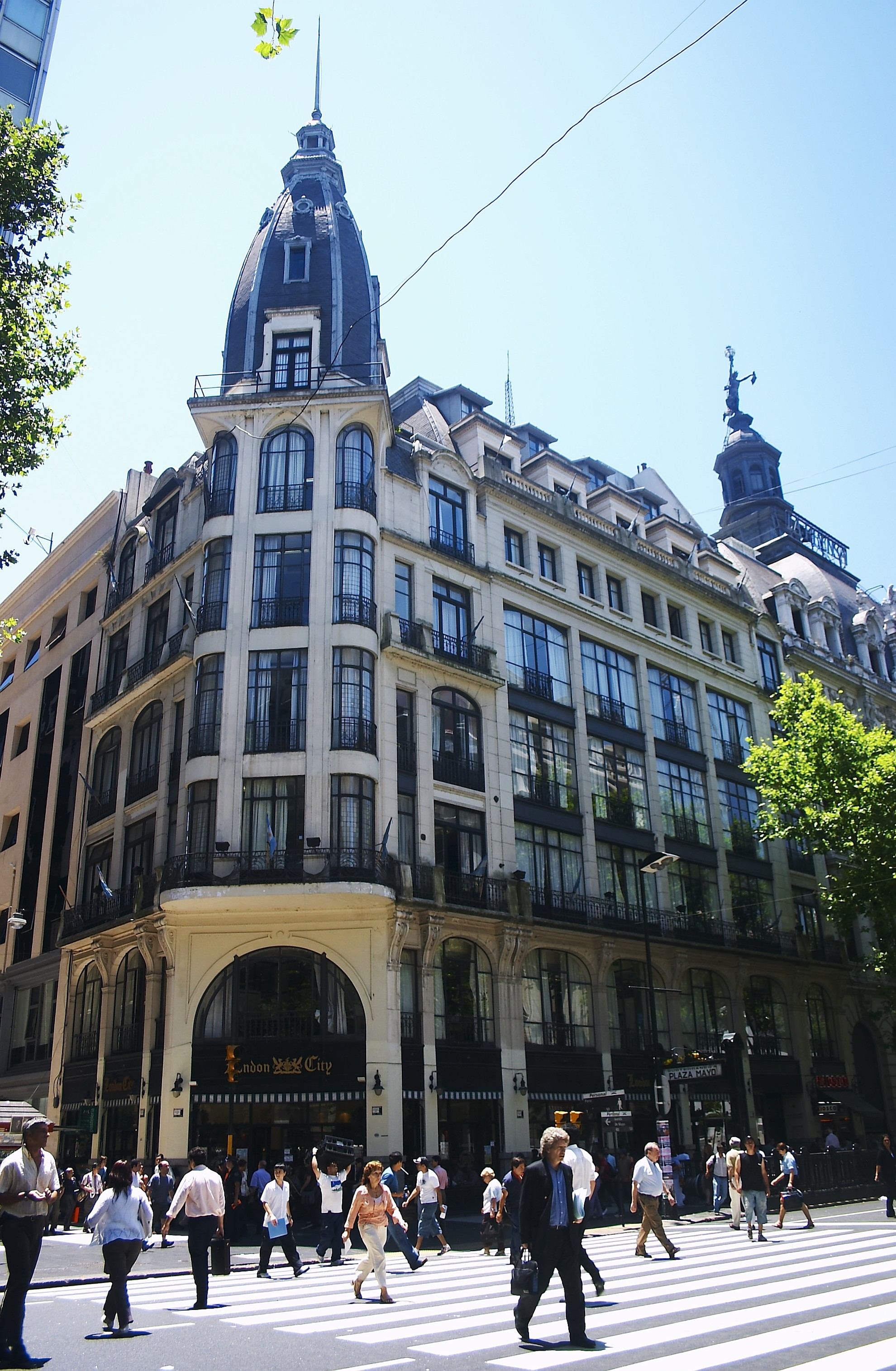
London City Café

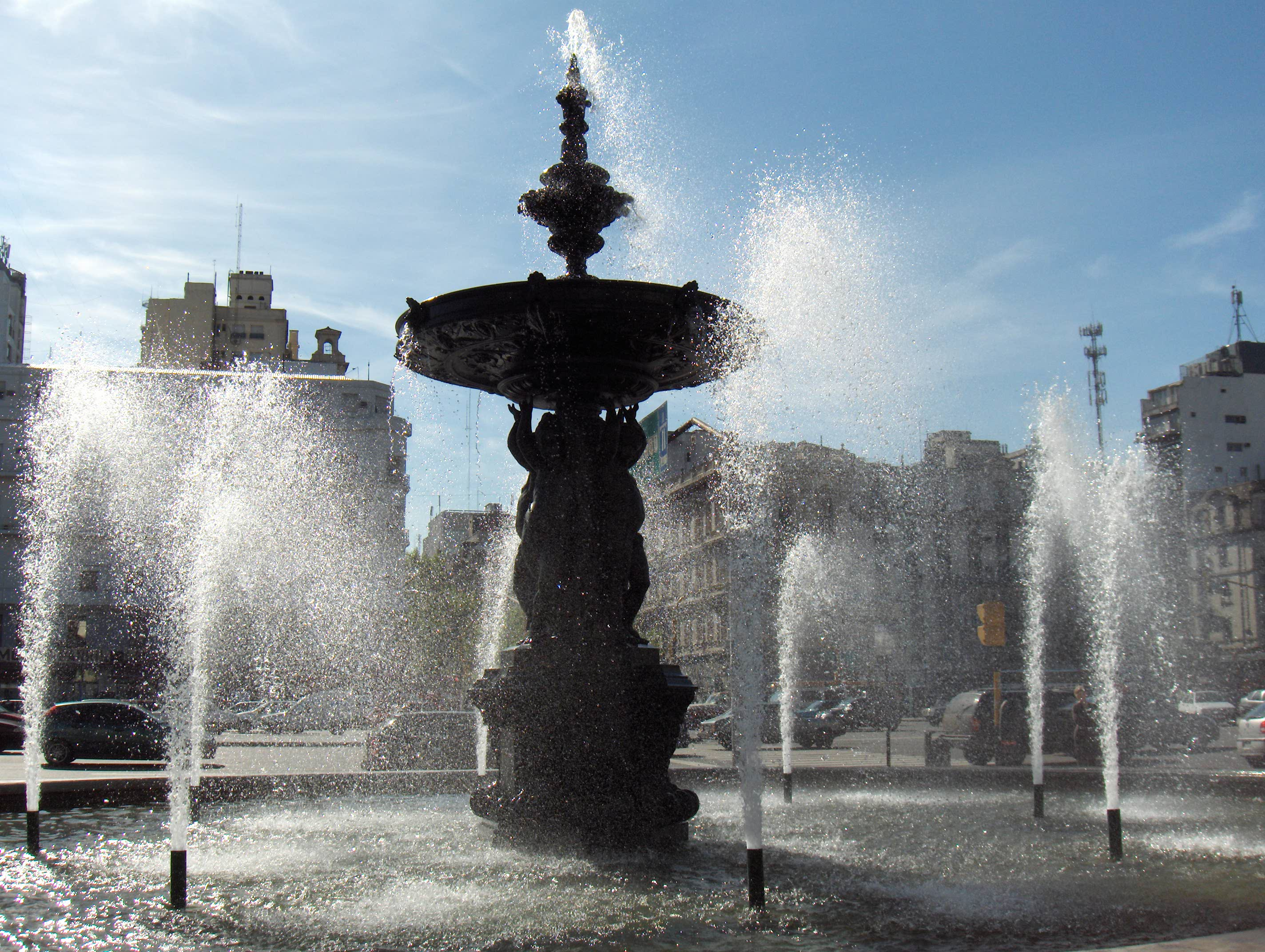
Fountain located at the intersection of Avenida de Mayo and 9 de julio

== See also ==
- Hotel Majestic (Buenos Aires)
- Hotel Chile
