= Hotel Majestic (Buenos Aires) =

Historic former hotel building, Buenos Aires, Argentina

Former Hotel Majestic
- Ex Hotel Majestic
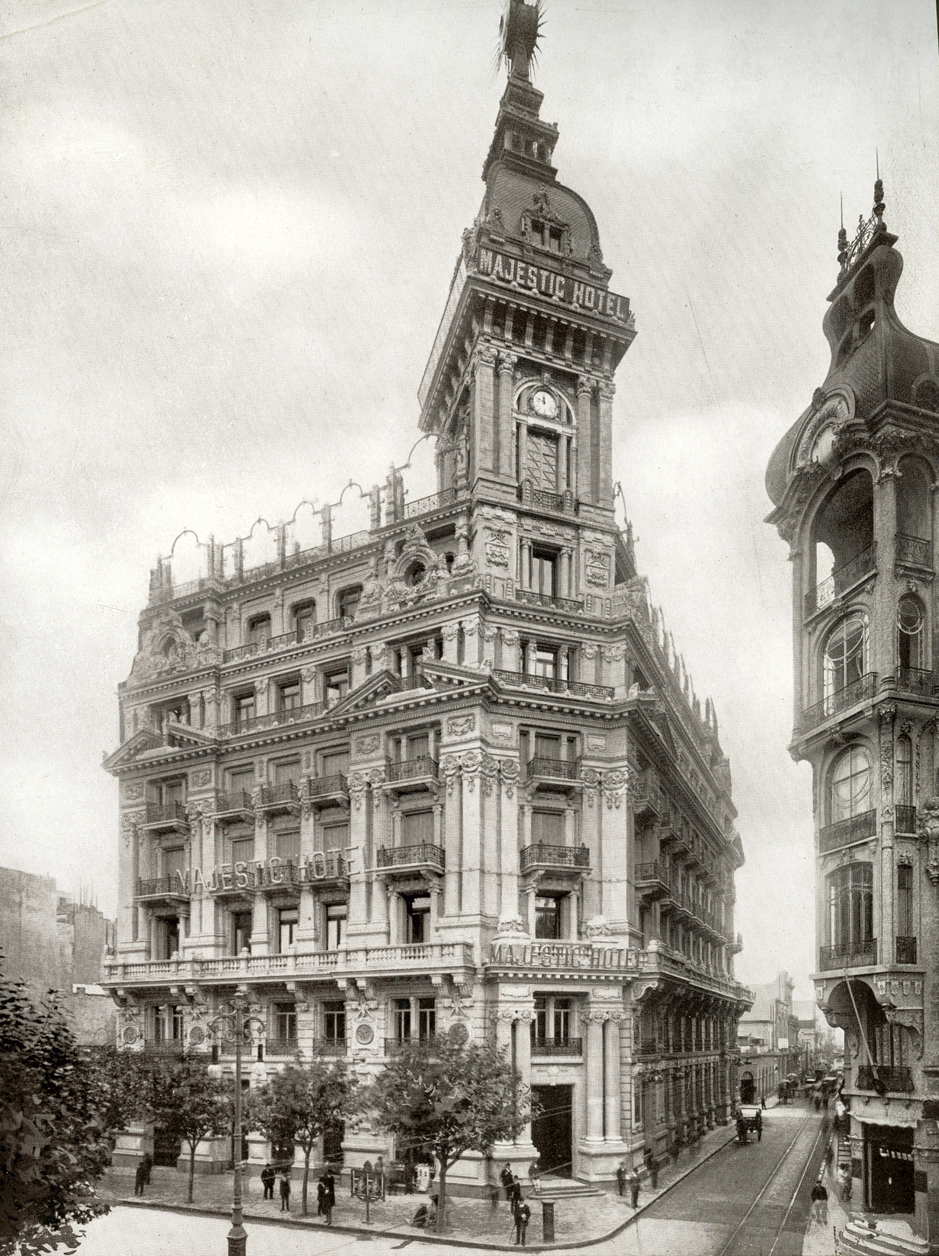
- The original Hotel Majestic, c. 1912
- Interactive map of the Former Hotel Majestic area
- Former names: Caja Internacional Mutua de Pensiones building

General information
- Architectural style: Eclectic
- Location: Avenida de Mayo 1301–1317, at Santiago del Estero, Buenos Aires, Argentina
- Completed: 1909
- Owner: Argentine state

Technical details
- Structural system: Masonry and iron
- Floor count: 9 (original design)
- Floor area: 8,218 m2 (original design)

Design and construction
- Architects: F. L. Collivadino and I. Benedetti

The former Hotel Majestic (Spanish: Ex Hotel Majestic), originally built for the Caja Internacional Mutua de Pensiones, is an historic building in Monserrat, Buenos Aires, Argentina. It stands on Avenida de Mayo at the corner of Santiago del Estero, opposite Hotel Chile, and is one of the avenue's most prominent early 20th-century buildings, noted for its tower and scale. Completed in 1909, it later operated as the luxury Hotel Majestic before being adapted for use by Argentine tax agency.

== History ==
The Caja Internacional Mutua de Pensiones, popularly known as La Mutua, was founded in 1901. It eventually had more than 40,000 members and seven buildings of its own. Between 1904 and 1905, La Mutua acquired two lots on Santiago del Estero Street between Avenida de Mayo and Rivadavia Avenue, in Monserrat, for the construction of its headquarters, rental office floors, and apartments for members. In 1904 it called a design competition with the collaboration of the Sociedad Central de Arquitectos. The winning proposal, submitted under the motto Mercurio, was by the architects F. L. Collivadino and I. Benedetti; after the purchase of adjacent lots, however, the original design was enlarged and modified.

On the eve of the centennial of the May Revolution, the building was leased and converted into a luxury hotel, which opened in 1909 and hosted foreign delegations during the centennial festivities. The hotel closed around 1930. The national government acquired the property in 1931 and first installed the Dirección General de Impuesto a los Réditos there. In 1947 the tax agency was reorganized as the Dirección General Impositiva (DGI), and in 1996 the building passed to the newly created Administración Federal de Ingresos Públicos.

In 2007 AFIP and the Sociedad Central de Arquitectos launched a new design competition to restore and adapt the deteriorated building, but the project was not carried out as originally planned. The building has been vacant since 2007. Façade restoration began in 2014, and a first preliminary restoration phase was completed in 2021. In 2020 the property was assigned for future use by the National Parks Administration, but in 2024 that assignment was revoked and the building was reassigned to the Agencia de Recaudación y Control Aduanero.

=== Notable guests ===
Documented guests include Vaslav Nijinsky, who married there, and Le Corbusier, who stayed there in 1929. Later secondary sources also associate the hotel with aviator Adrienne Bolland and writer Antoine de Saint-Exupéry. The Portuguese writer and diplomat Abel Botelho lived in the hotel and died there in 1917.

== Architecture ==
The building for La Mutua was one of the most ambitious architectural projects of its period in Buenos Aires because of its mixed program, its scale, and the conditions imposed by the cooperative. The ground floor and lower levels were intended to house La Mutua's headquarters and offices, while the upper floors were designed as rental apartments expected to produce a gross return of 10 percent. The design brief required a building with the appearance of a financial institution, crowned by the cooperative's emblem on the dome: a radiant sun.

The original structure comprised a basement, ground floor, seven upper stories, an accessible roof terrace, and an eighth-story level in the tower. The entrances for the commercial premises and the apartments were clearly separated: La Mutua's premises occupied the two chamfered corners at street level, while the residential entrance was placed on Avenida de Mayo 1317.

The banking hall of La Mutua occupied the ground floor. It was designed with three rows of columns, freeing the interior from structural walls and creating a large space for public attention. This hall was originally lit by two decorative skylights that filtered sunlight in vivid colors; neither survives today.

The residential entrance leads to a monumental vestibule with two cage elevators and an imperial staircase embellished with decorative ironwork, wooden handrails, and bronze statuary. The upper floors are arranged around two central cores linked by bridges: one contains the main staircase and the other is a light court that illuminates and ventilates the interior corridors. The original apartments varied in size, but all faced outward, typically with a small vestibule, a bathroom to one side, a sitting room, and differing numbers of bedrooms.

The top residential level ended in another decorative skylight and was enclosed only by an iron-and-glass structure that lit the upper landing of the main staircase, which was also decorated with bronze statuary. From the seventh floor one could reach the terrace, once enclosed by a masonry colonnade joined by decorative ironwork; this feature was later demolished during tax-agency alterations.

Above the roofline, the tower contained a final duplex apartment. Its façades were emphasized by four clocks and a continuous balcony, and its original mansard roof was crowned by the radiant sun emblem of La Mutua.

== Alterations ==
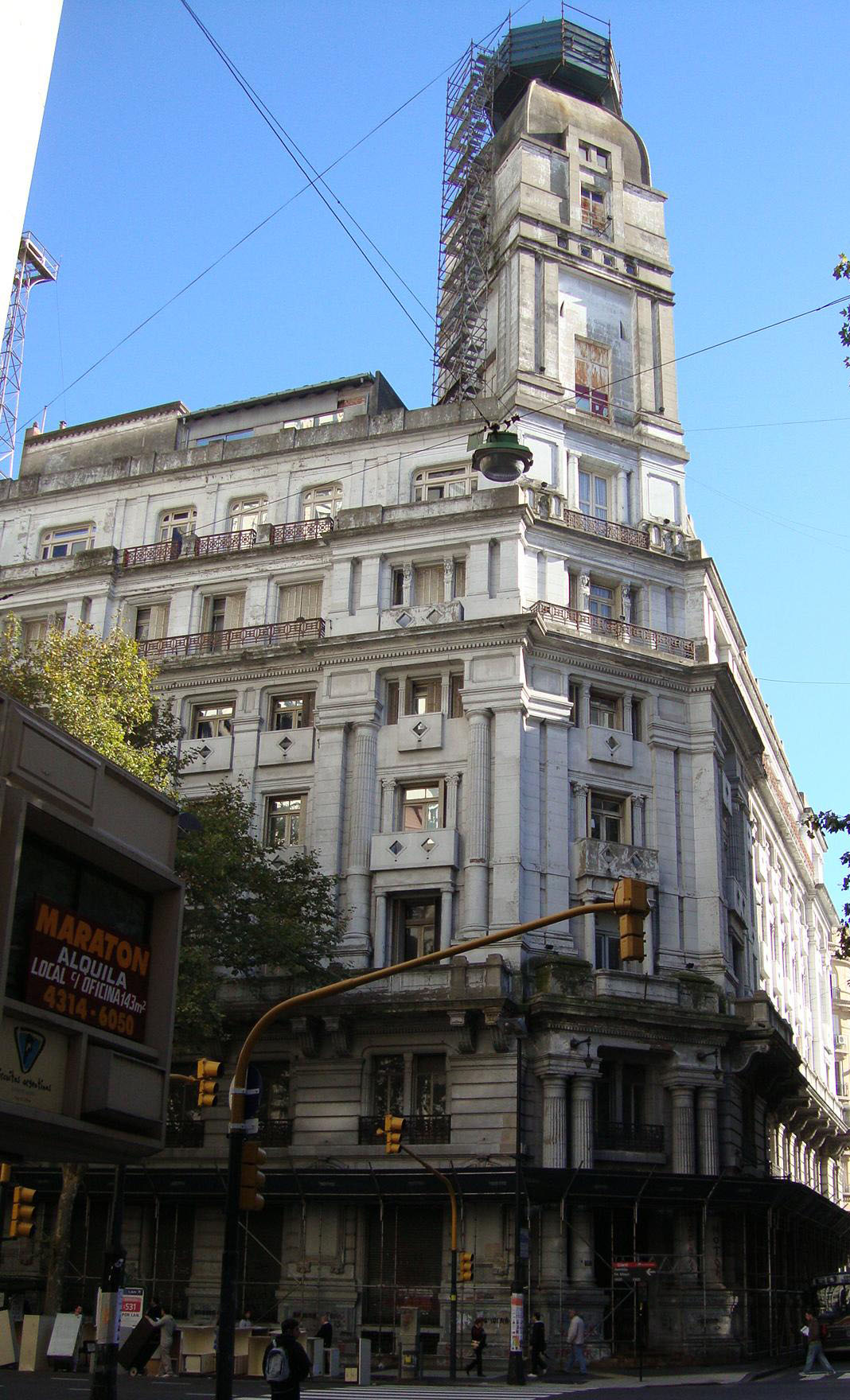
The building after later alterations

After the former hotel was adapted for government offices from 1931 onward, the building underwent successive renovations that subdivided rooms for office use and removed much of the ornament from the façades. In the process, the exterior was progressively simplified in the interest of easier maintenance.

The central-court skylight was replaced with a roof, the top-floor mansard was dismantled to create a roof garden, and additional floors were added. The slate-clad dome was replaced by a concrete structure and lost its pinnacle and radiant sun; balconies with decorative iron railings were rebuilt in masonry with diamond-shaped openings; and oculi, pediments, balusters, the rooftop colonnade, the four clocks, the tower lantern, the perimeter viewing balcony, and the ornamental ground-floor marquee were removed.

Even so, the building preserves a significant part of its interior decoration, including extensive boiserie and original frosted-glass doors bearing the hotel's initials.

== 2007 redevelopment proposal ==
In July 2007, AFIP and the Sociedad Central de Arquitectos called a competition for the building's restoration and adaptive reuse. The concept promoted by the brief was an interactive complex intended to help reshape tax culture in Argentina. The ground floor was to contain public-service, exhibition, and museum areas devoted to the history of taxation in Argentina from the colonial period onward, conceived so that some activities could be seen from outside without entering the building; a cultural venue for exhibitions and related events was also planned.

The program also envisioned library, training, taxpayer-information, staff-support, and research areas, as well as renewed use of the tower and roof terrace as a public viewpoint.

The winning proposal, by Juan José Vicario and Juan Ignacio Meoz, combined heritage recovery with overtly contemporary additions. In the architects' published scheme, basement exhibition areas were visually connected to the street, the upper floors were adapted for offices, a new fire stair and service core were inserted on the Rivadavia side, and the tower was to receive a glazed dome recalling the geometry of the original slate-clad roof.
