= Hotel Chile =

Horel in Buenos Aires, Argentina

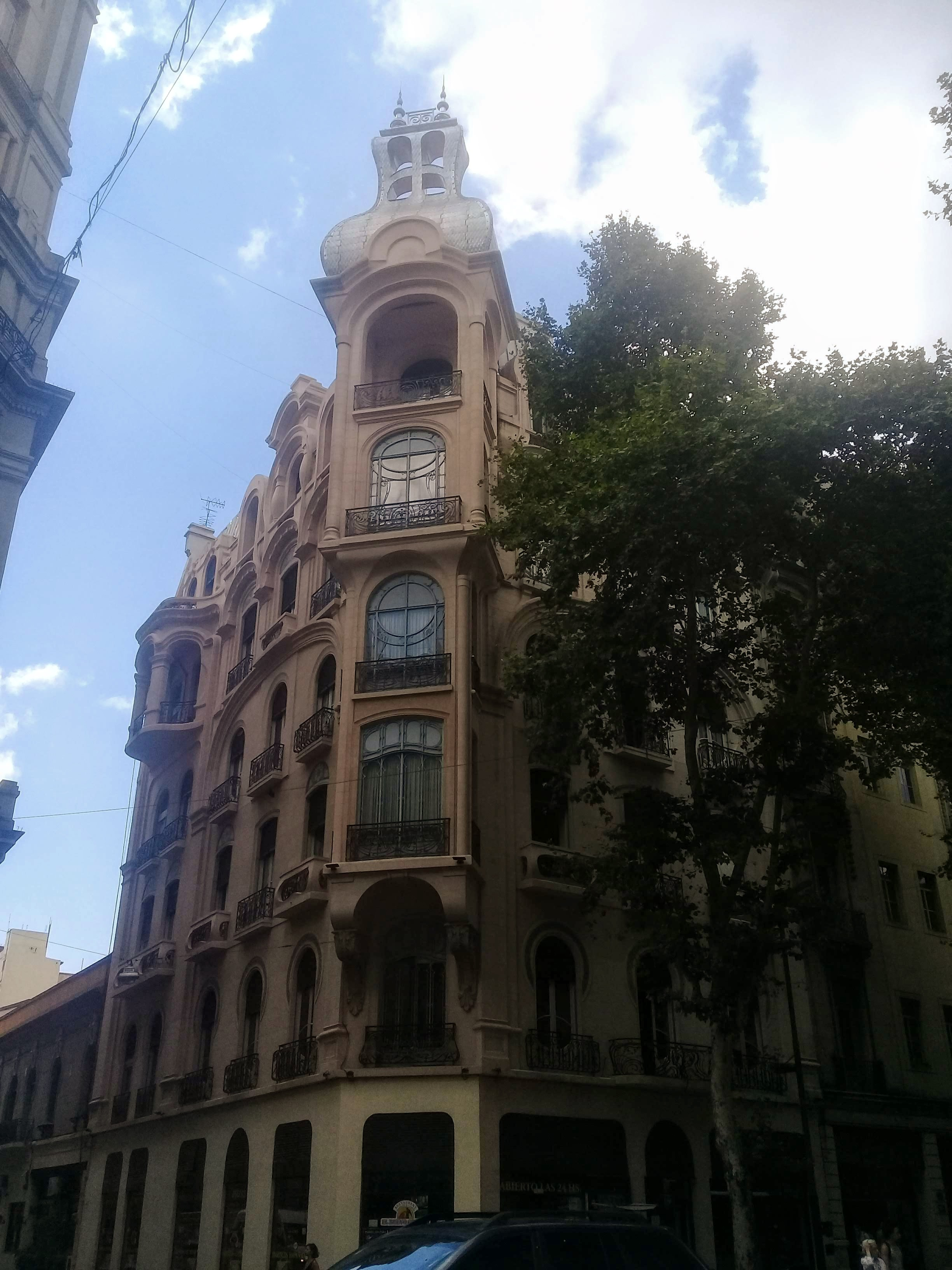
- Interactive map of the Hotel Chile area
- Alternative names: Lutetia Hotel, Hotel National, Chile Hotel Romanelli

General information
- Type: Hotel
- Architectural style: French Art Nouveau style
- Location: Buenos Aires, Argentina
- Opened: 1906

Design and construction
- Architect: Louis Dubois

Other information
- Number of rooms: 53

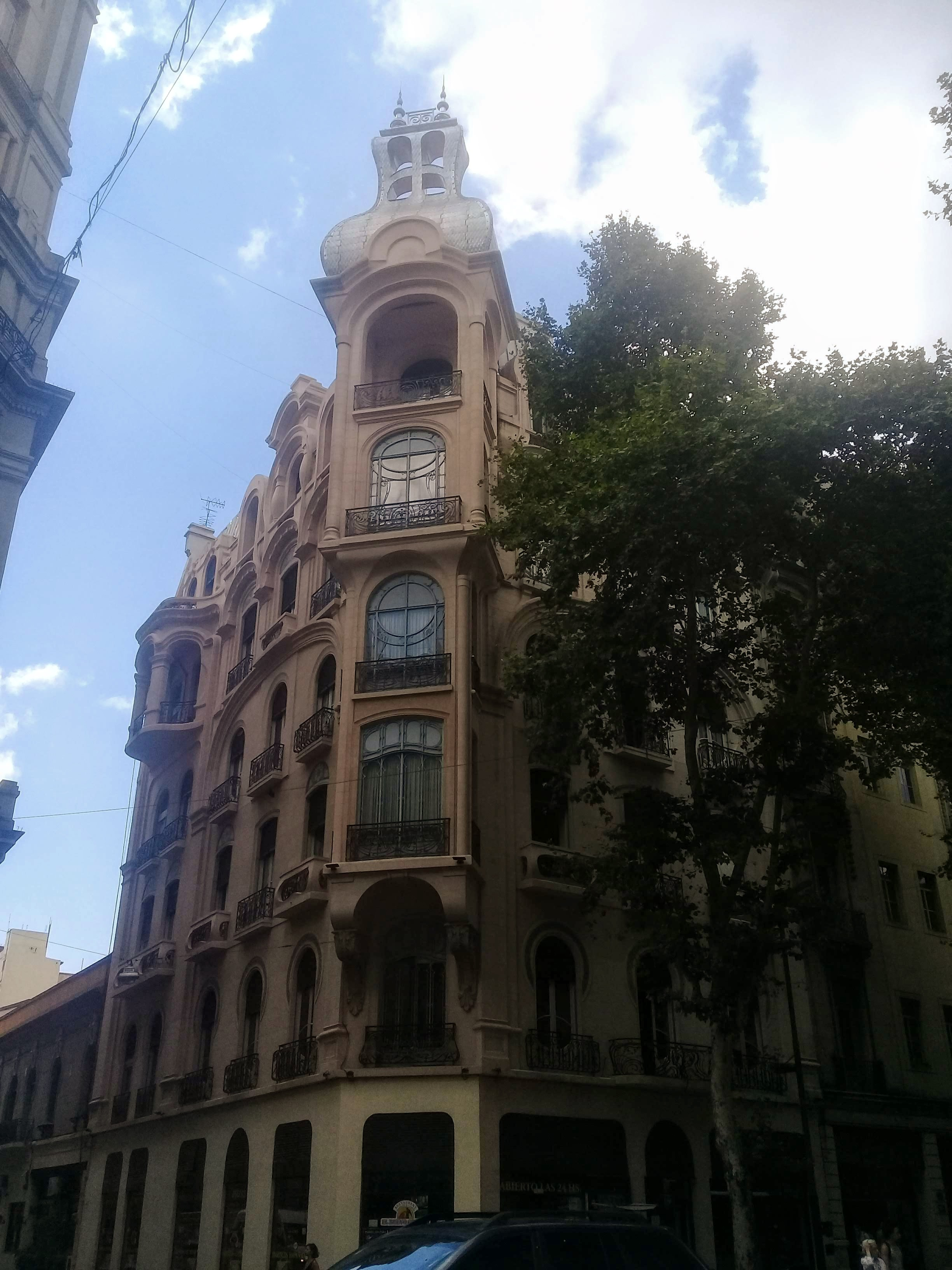
Hotel Chile

Hotel Chile is a hotel on the corner of May Avenue and Santiago del Estero Street, in the downtown Montserrat section of Buenos Aires, Argentina. Designed in 1907 by the French architect Louis Dubois, a graduate of the École des Beaux-Arts in Paris, the 70-room hotel is one of the most prominent surviving local examples of the French Art Nouveau style.

== History ==
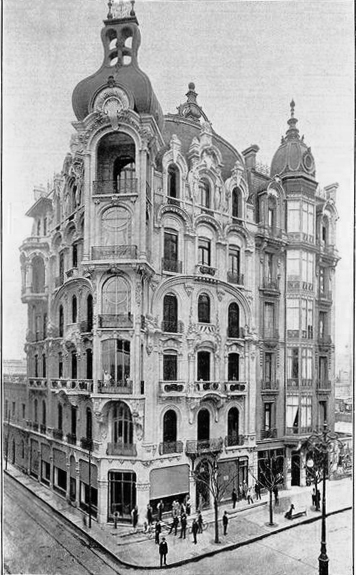
Former Hotel Lutecia

It was designed by architect Louis Dubois in 1904 and opened in 1906 originally called Lutetia Hotel, and was one of the greatest representatives of Art Nouveau arrived in Argentina in the early twentieth century. The Avenida de Mayo was still a fashionable avenue, opened in 1896, where during the passage of the first decade of the styles used for buildings evolved, from academicism or Neoclassicism to Art Nouveau, Art Deco and later.

Moreover the Avenue, which had been designed for residences of the aristocracy and great palaces, was exploited by the owners of the plots to build apartment buildings for income (rent) which quickly mutated into hotels. It was at that point that Hotel Lutetia was constructed.

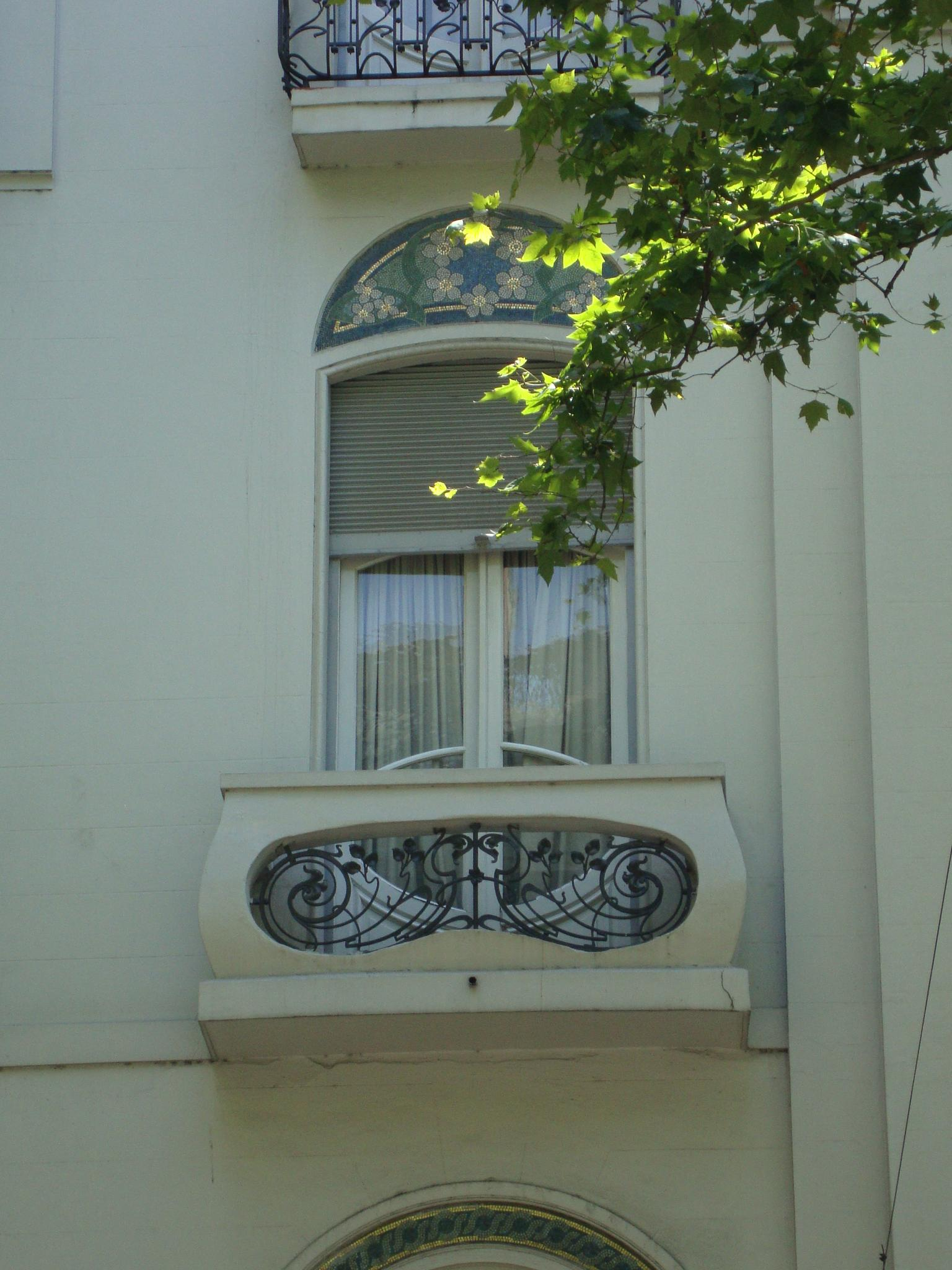
Detail of iron work on a balcony

It later became Hotel Nacional. In 1938, it changed hands and became Chile Hotel Romanelli, still owned by the hotelier Romanelli. May Avenue fell into decay over the decades and the focus for office buildings shifted to other sectors, while the artery was affected by the leading political and social situations in the country. Connecting the Palace of Congress with the House of Government, it is the scene of frequent political demonstrations and marches.

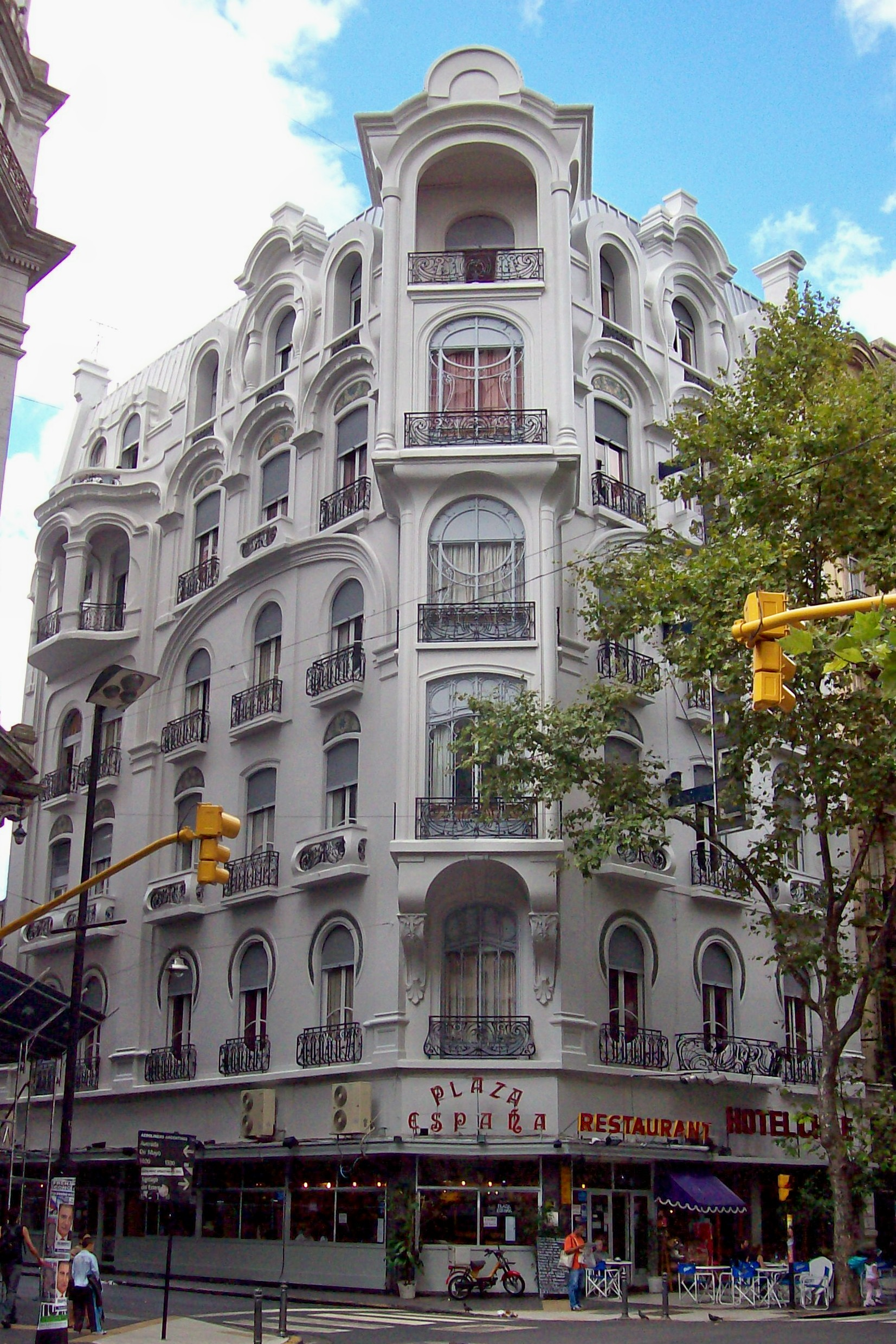
The hotel in 2007 without its Art Nouveau dome, before its restoration in 2018

The worst Hotel Chile disaster occurred on August 4, 1988, when a fire broke out at 0:30 am on the 4th floor, 2 extending to the attic (5th floor) and the dome, and totally consuming them within two hours. Also the front of the building was seriously damaged, large pieces of masonry falling into the street. The hotel was restored, replacing the slate mansard corrugated iron, without recovering his famous dome. The next door building on Avenida de Mayo, designed by architect Dubois, was also affected by the incident, and had to be completely reworked, also losing is cupola bay window and other elements adorning its facade.

On August 2018, a new dome - an exact replica of the original (including zinc plates manufactured in France and Germany) was restored in place. The facade which was also restored nevertheless shows a more simplified design lacking many of the ornamental details.

On the ground floor of the Hotel Chile functioned for years the Spanish restaurant Plaza España, one of several specializing in traditional Spanish cuisine in this section of the Avenida de Mayo, an artery that historically was adopted by the Spanish immigrant community since the early twentieth century.
