= Francesco Parisi (painter) =

Italian-Argentine painter

Francesco Parisi (born in 1857 in Taranto, Italy - 1948) was an Italian-Argentine painter.

== Early years in Italy ==
He studied design in Taranto and Naples. He then moved to Rome to work under Domenico Torti, where they worked together in the Pinacoteca Vaticana, in San Giovanni Laterano, and in the decoration of the Pecci family chapel in the church of the Stimmate.

== Later life in Argentina ==
In 1889, he moved to Buenos Aires. There he completed a number of projects including the ceilings of the studio of the house of the deputy J. Hernandez. He painted many of the frescoes in the Cathedral of Buenos Aires. For the ceiling of the presbytery, he painted Christ among the Doctors; Christ at the Well with the Adulterer. In the cupola, he depicted the Triumph of Religion. In the drum of the dome, he painted sybils, prophets, and apostles. In the nave ceiling, he painted the Assumption of the Virgin. He also collaborated with Bordellini and Raus in the decoration of the church of San Nicola and with Moretti and Bergamaschi in the Church of the Monserrate.

Among some of his works are a painting depicting the Pompeian Baths at Carnevale, the Villa Borghese (Rome); the Torre del Greco; a Storm in San Fernando, the Puente del Inca Zelika la tanto decantata egiziana; La Movediza del Tandil; Two Gobelins; a Diana and Jove; Complot; and La Mietitura.

In Argentina, he had a number of pupils among them Signora E. A. de Paz, C. A. di Basualdo, la signorina Lavalle, Gomez; Hayward, Wodgate, and Cordeviola.
