= List of hotels: Countries A =

This is a list of what are intended to be the notable top hotels by country, five or four star hotels, notable skyscraper landmarks or historic hotels which are covered in multiple reliable publications.

== Abkhazia ==
- Hotel Abkhazia Sokhumi, Sukhumi
- Hotel Ritsa, Sukhumi
- Medea Hotel, Sukhumi

== Afghanistan ==
- Hotel Inter-Continental Kabul, Kabul
- Kabul Serena Hotel, Kabul
- Mazar Hotel, Mazar-e-Sharif
- Safi Landmark Hotel, Kabul
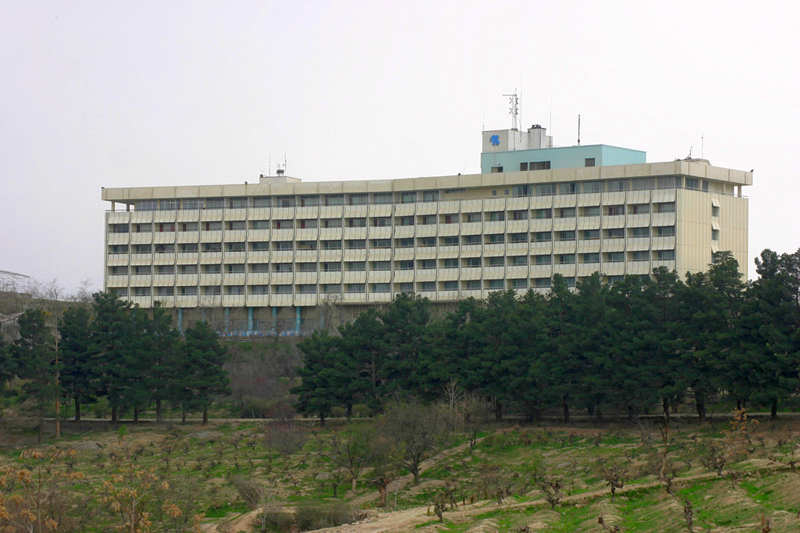
Hotel Inter-Continental Kabul

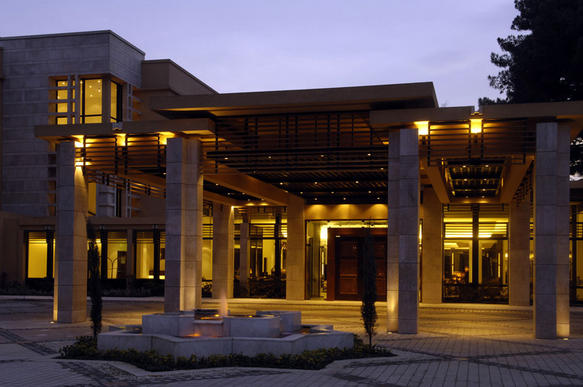
Kabul Serena Hotel

== Albania ==
- Adriatik Hotel, Durrës
- Tirana International Hotel, Tirana

== Algeria ==
- Hotel El-Djazaïr, Algiers
- Hilton Alger, Algiers
- Hotel Cirta, Annaba
- Royal Hotel, Oran
- Sheraton Oran Hotel and Towers, Oran
- Grand Hotel Cirta, Constantine
- Constantine Marriott Hotel, Constantine
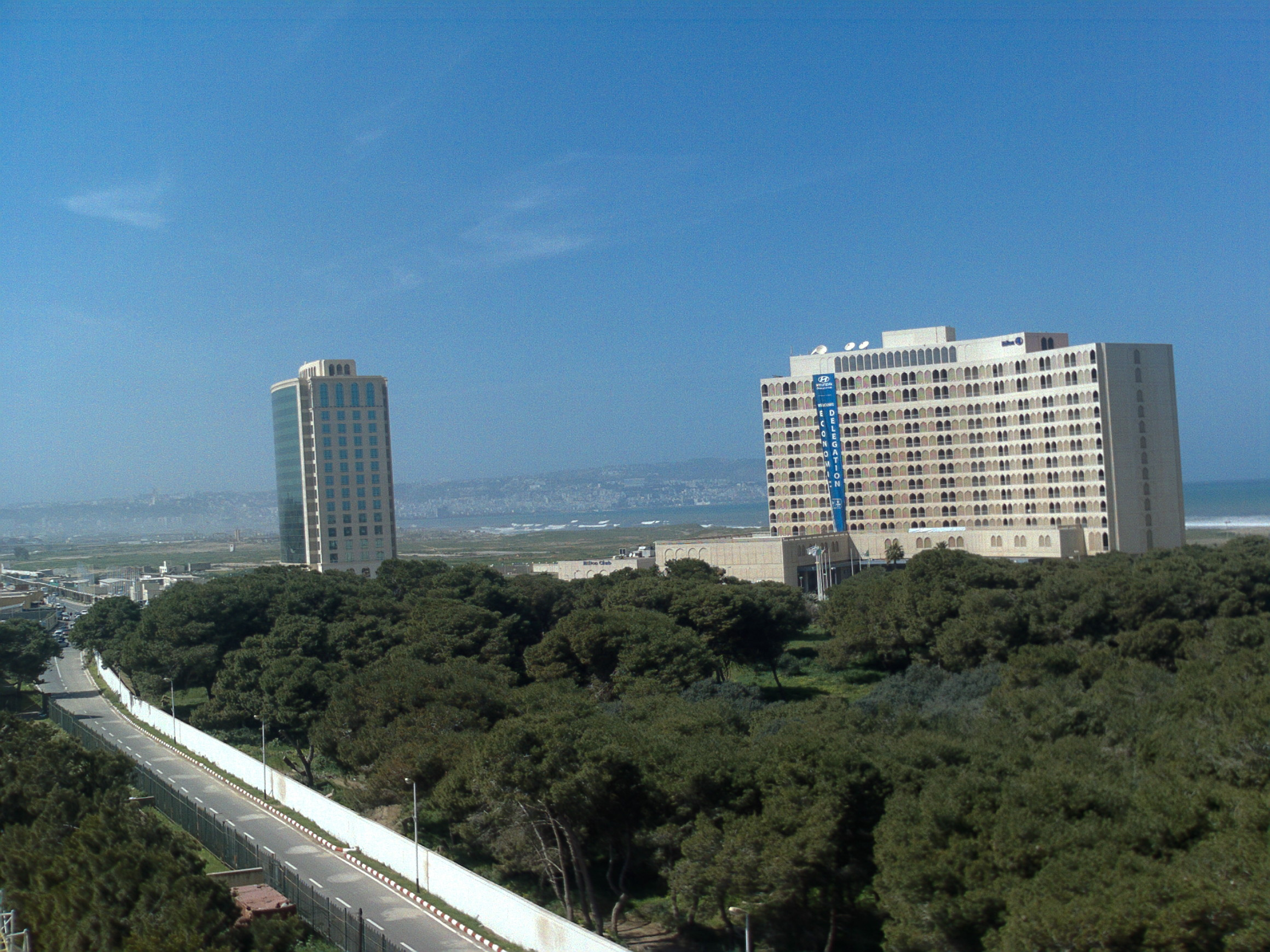
Hilton Alger

== American Samoa ==
- Rainmaker Hotel, Pago Pago
- Tradewinds Hotel, Fagatogo

== Angola ==
- Hotel Presidente Luanda, Luanda

== Anguilla ==
- Cap Juluca Hotel, Cap Juluca
- Carimar Beach Club, Mead's Bay, The Valley
- CuisinArt Resort and Spa, Rendezvous Beach

== Antigua and Barbuda ==
- Lashings, Runaway Bay

== Argentina ==
- El Castillo Hotel, Córdoba
- Hotel Villavicencio, Mendoza
- Llao Llao Hotel, San Carlos de Bariloche
- NH Gran Hotel Provincial, Mar del Plata

=== Buenos Aires ===
- Alvear Palace Hotel
- Alvear Tower
- Claridge Hotel
- Faena Hotel Buenos Aires
- Four Seasons Hotel Buenos Aires
- Grand Hotel
- Hilton Buenos Aires
- Hotel Chile
- Hotel Casa Lucia
- Madero Center
- Palacio Duhau - Park Hyatt Buenos Aires
- Plaza Hotel Buenos Aires
- Sheraton Buenos Aires Hotel & Convention Center
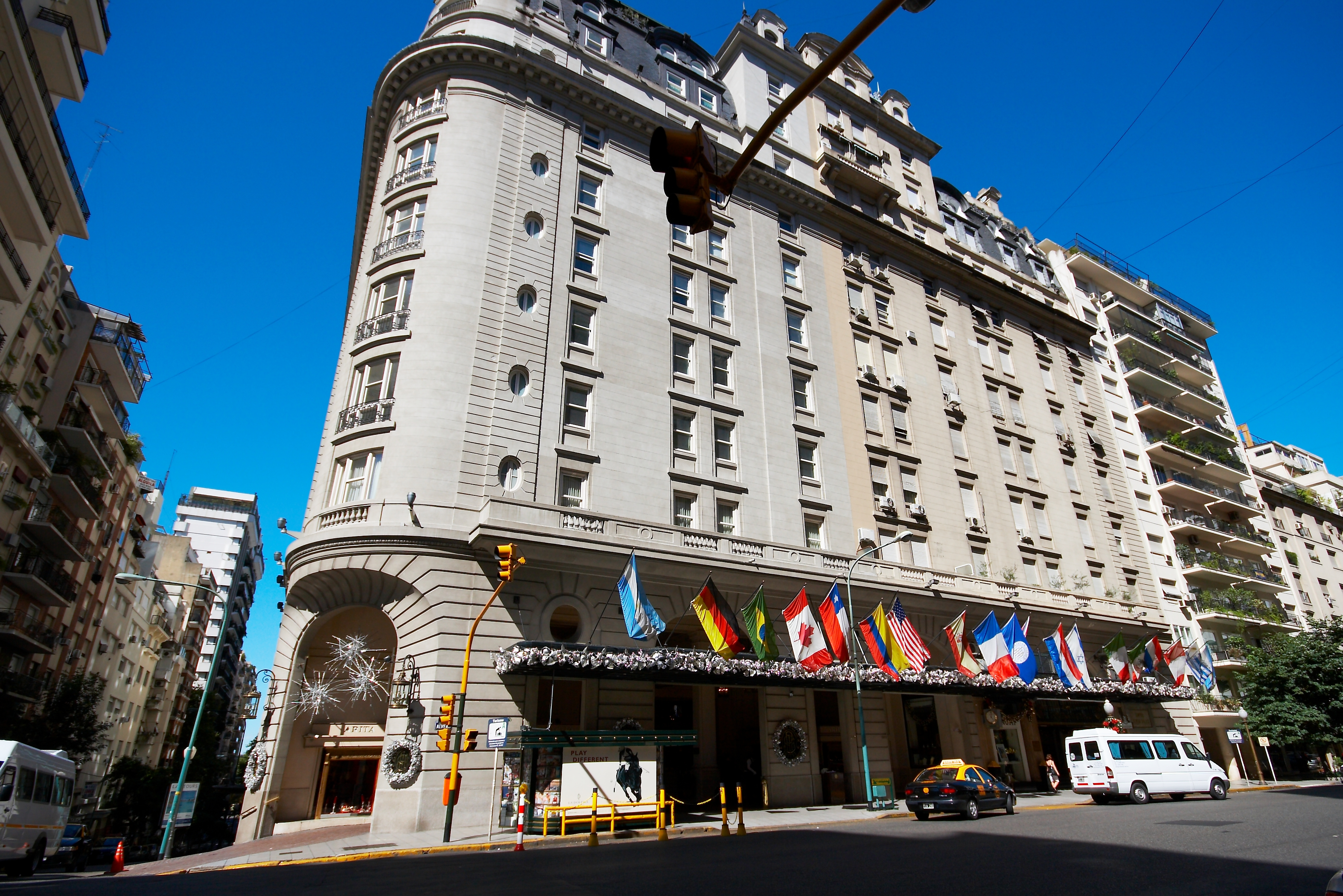
Alvear Palace Hotel

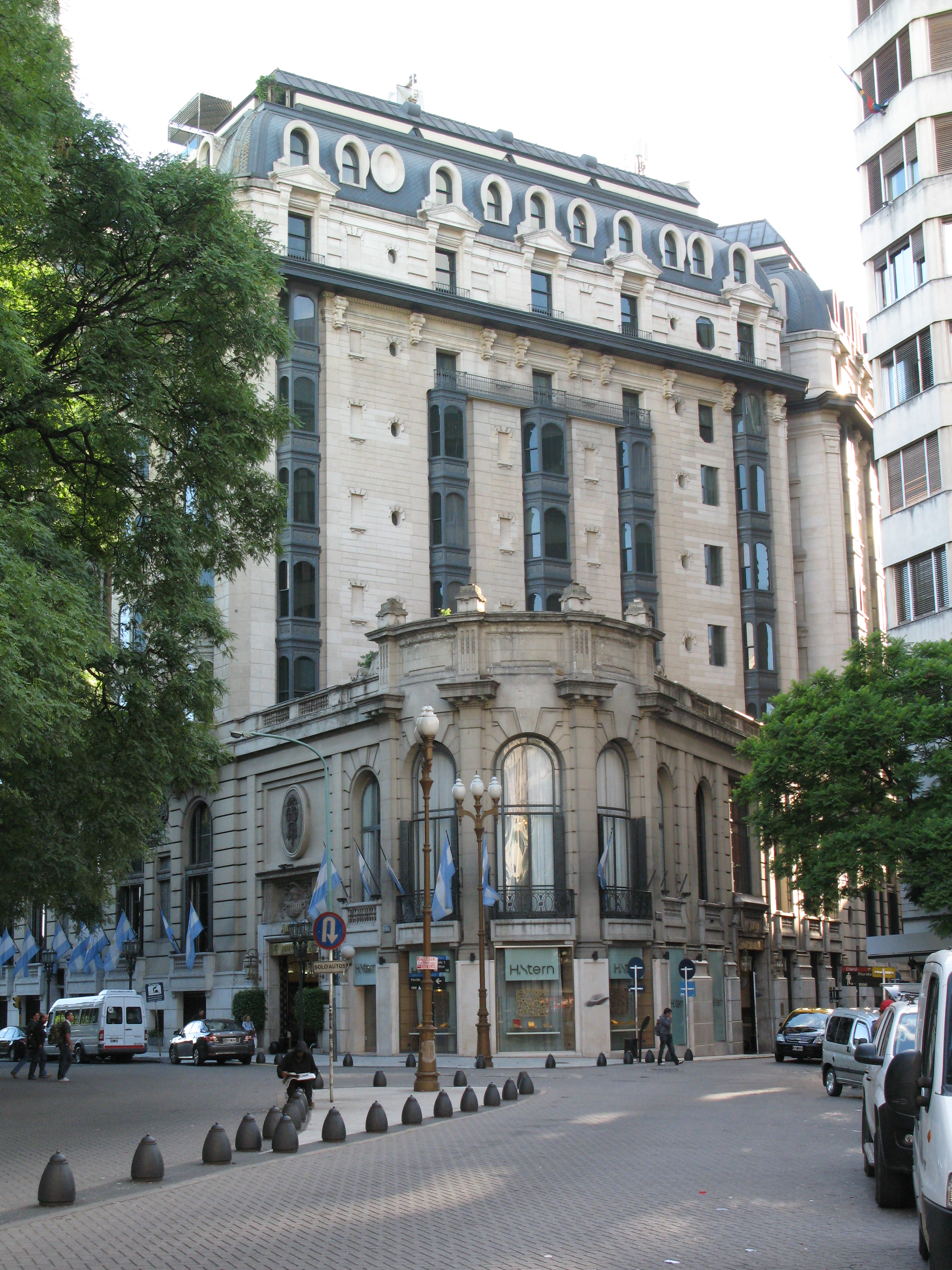
Marriott Plaza Hotel, Buenos Aires

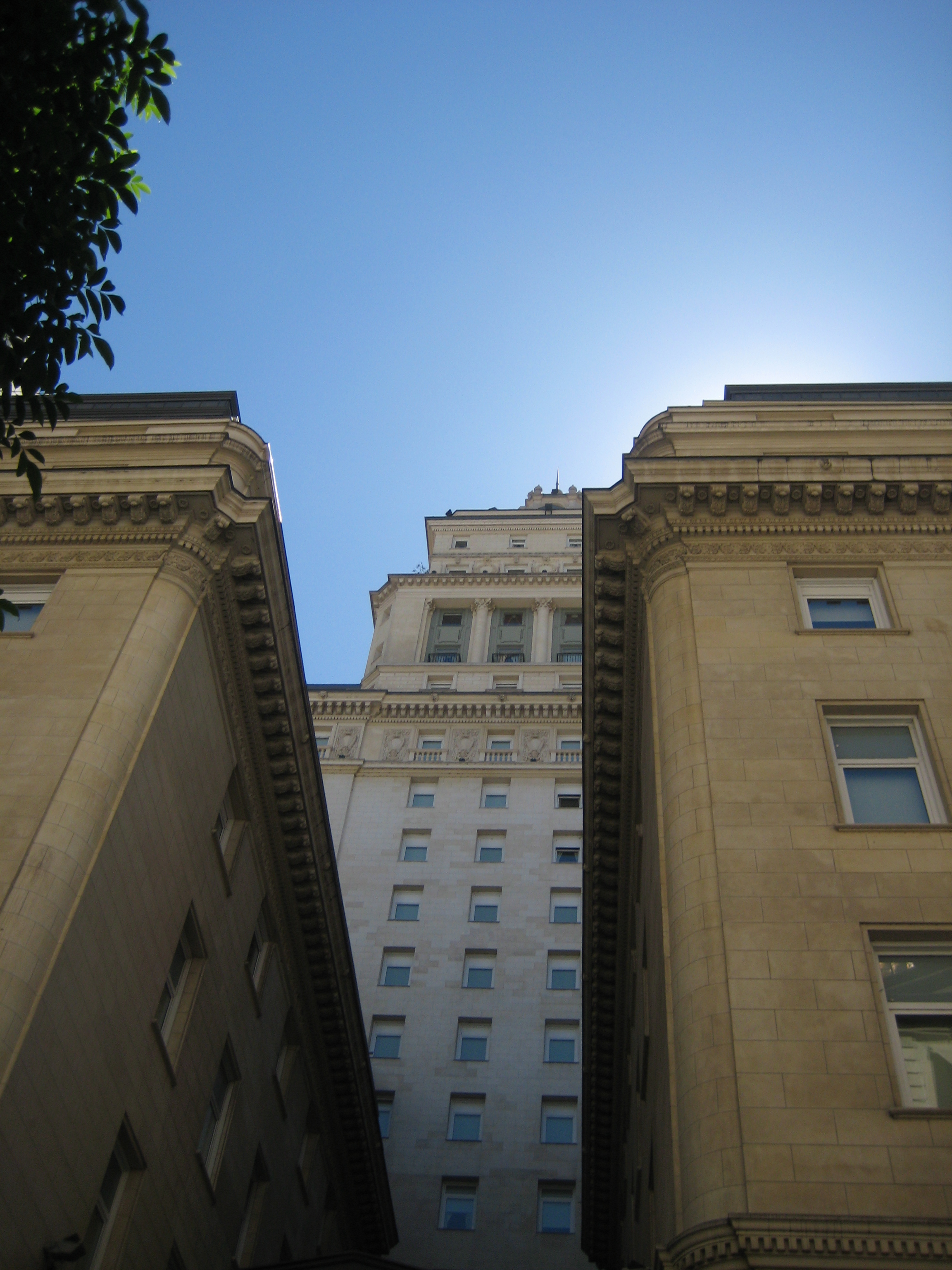
Sofitel Buenos Aires

== Armenia ==
- Grand Hotel Yerevan, Yerevan
- Armenia Marriott Hotel, Yerevan
- Ani Plaza Hotel, Yerevan
- Tsaghkadzor General Sports Complex, Tsaghkadzor, Kotayk
- Golden Palace Hotel, Tsaghkadzor, Kotayk
- Radisson Blu Hotel, Yerevan
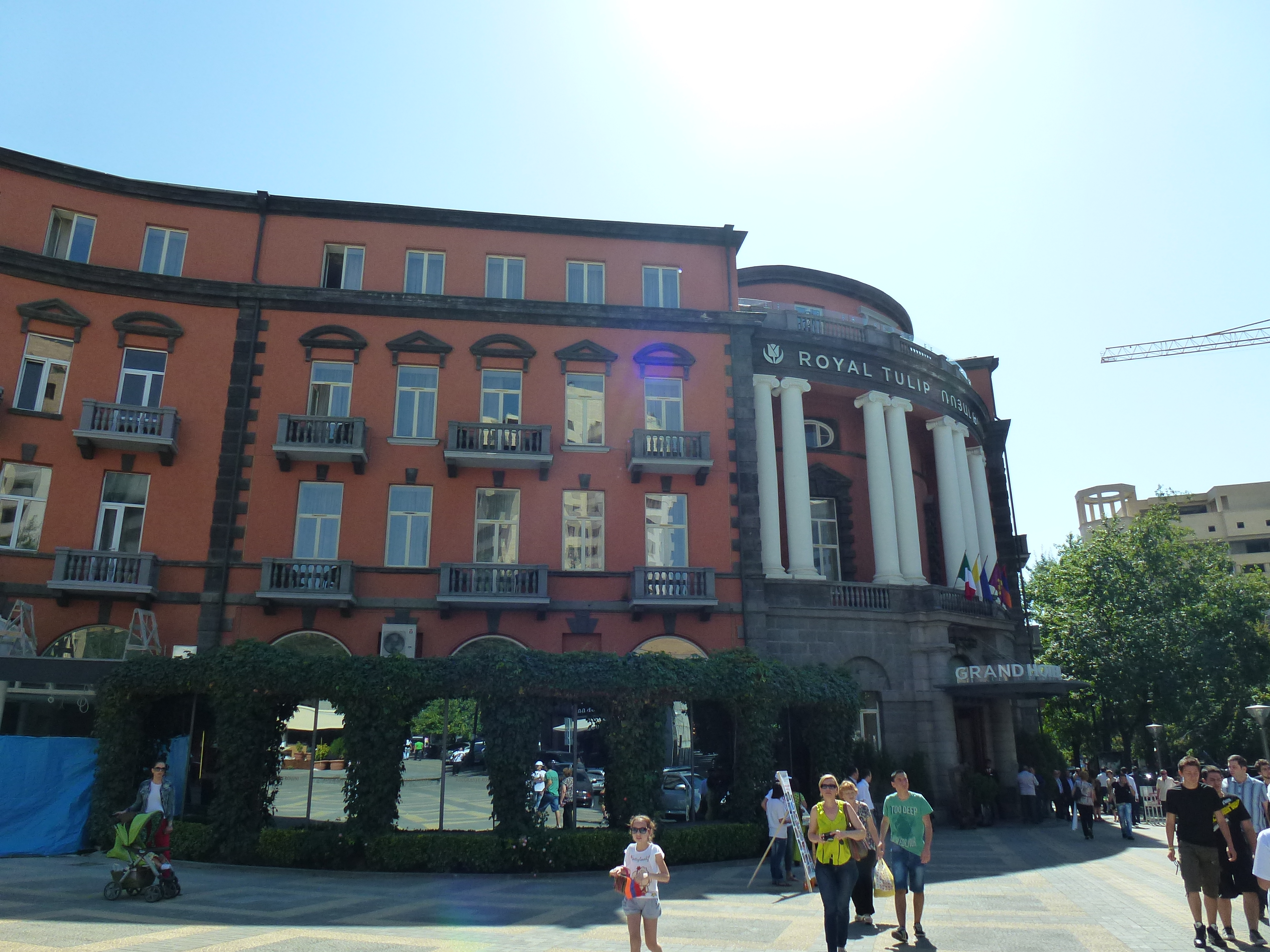
Grand Hotel Yerevan

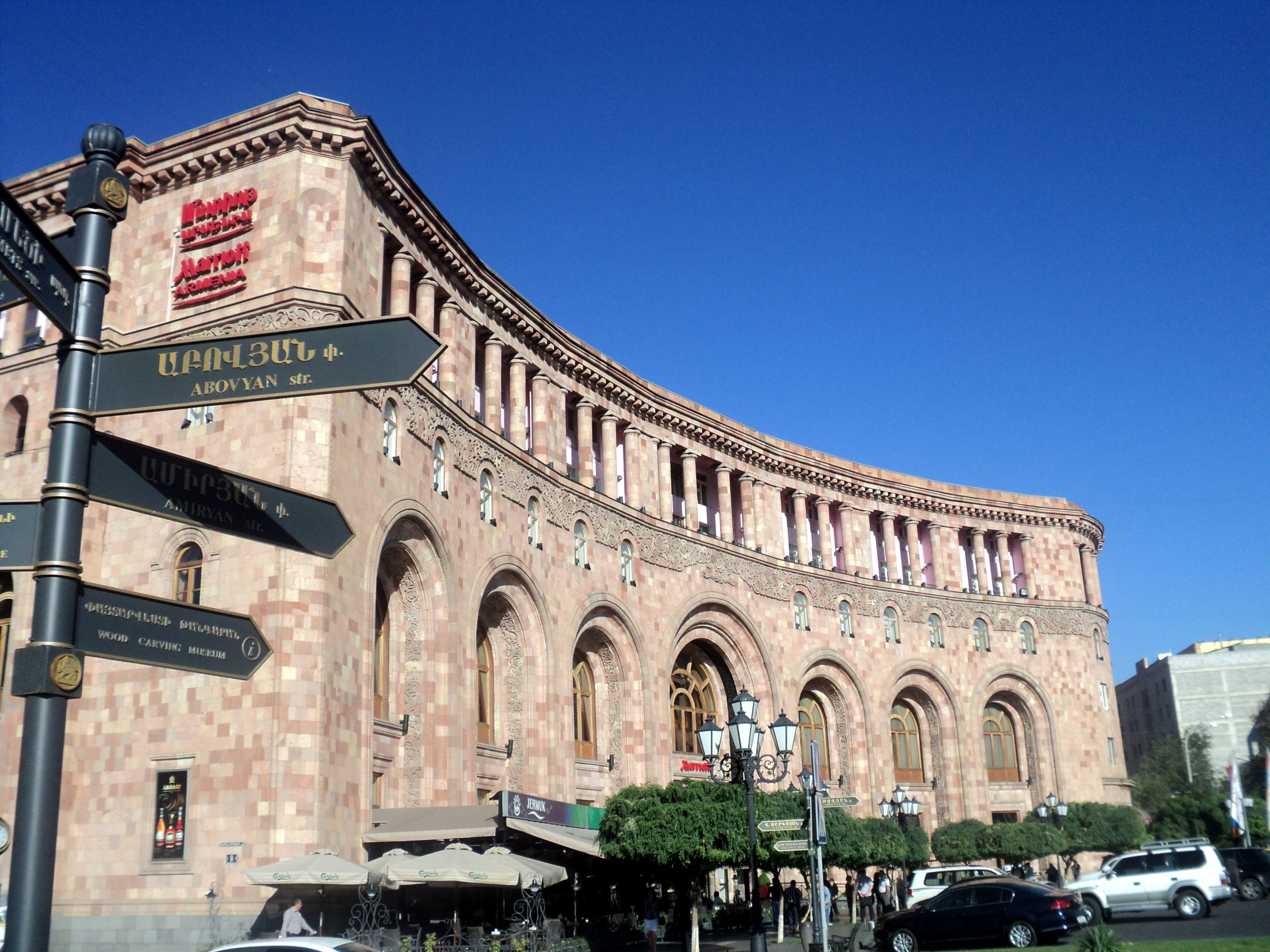
Armenia Marriott Hotel Yerevan

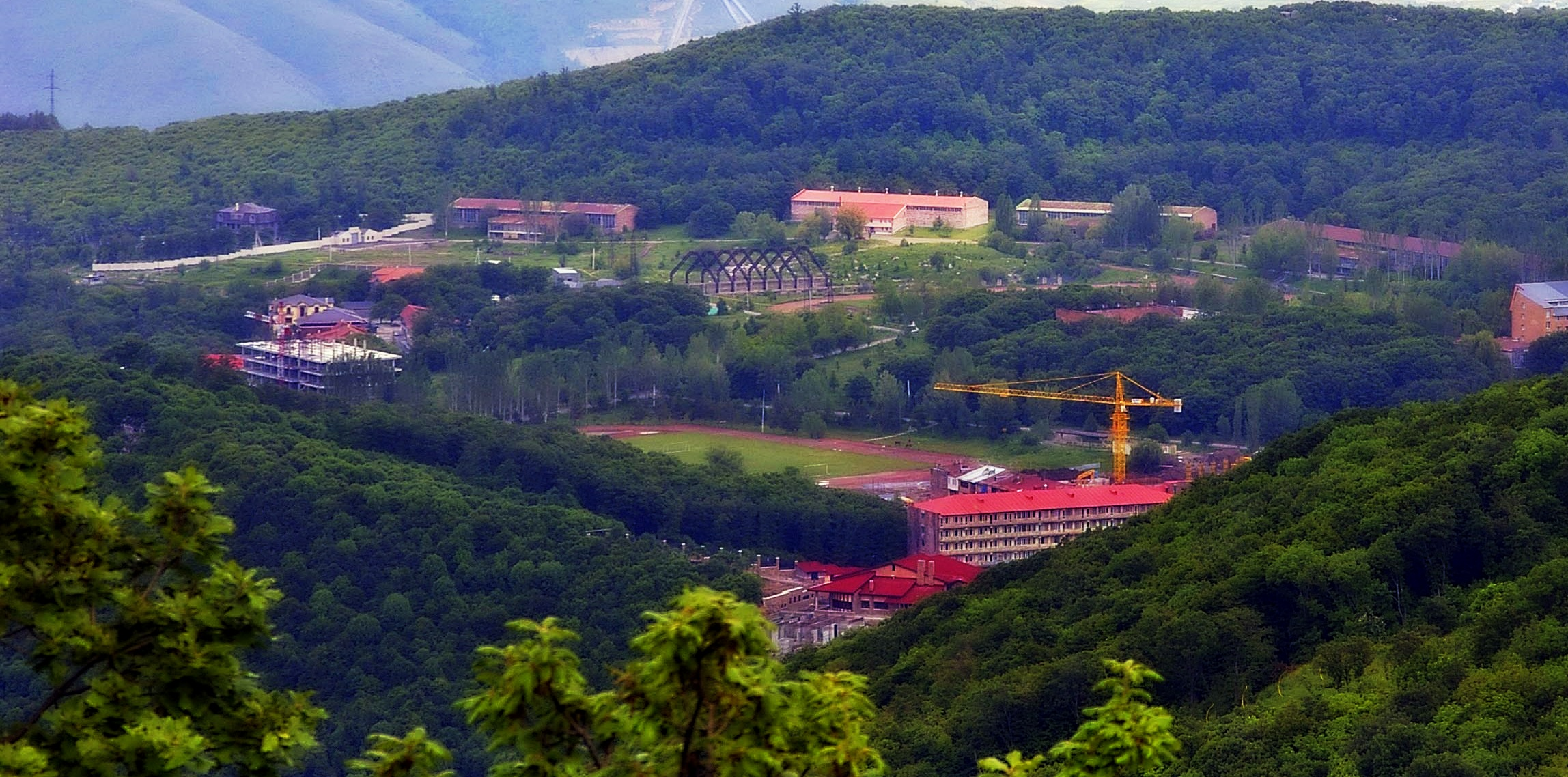
Tsaghkadzor General Sports Complex

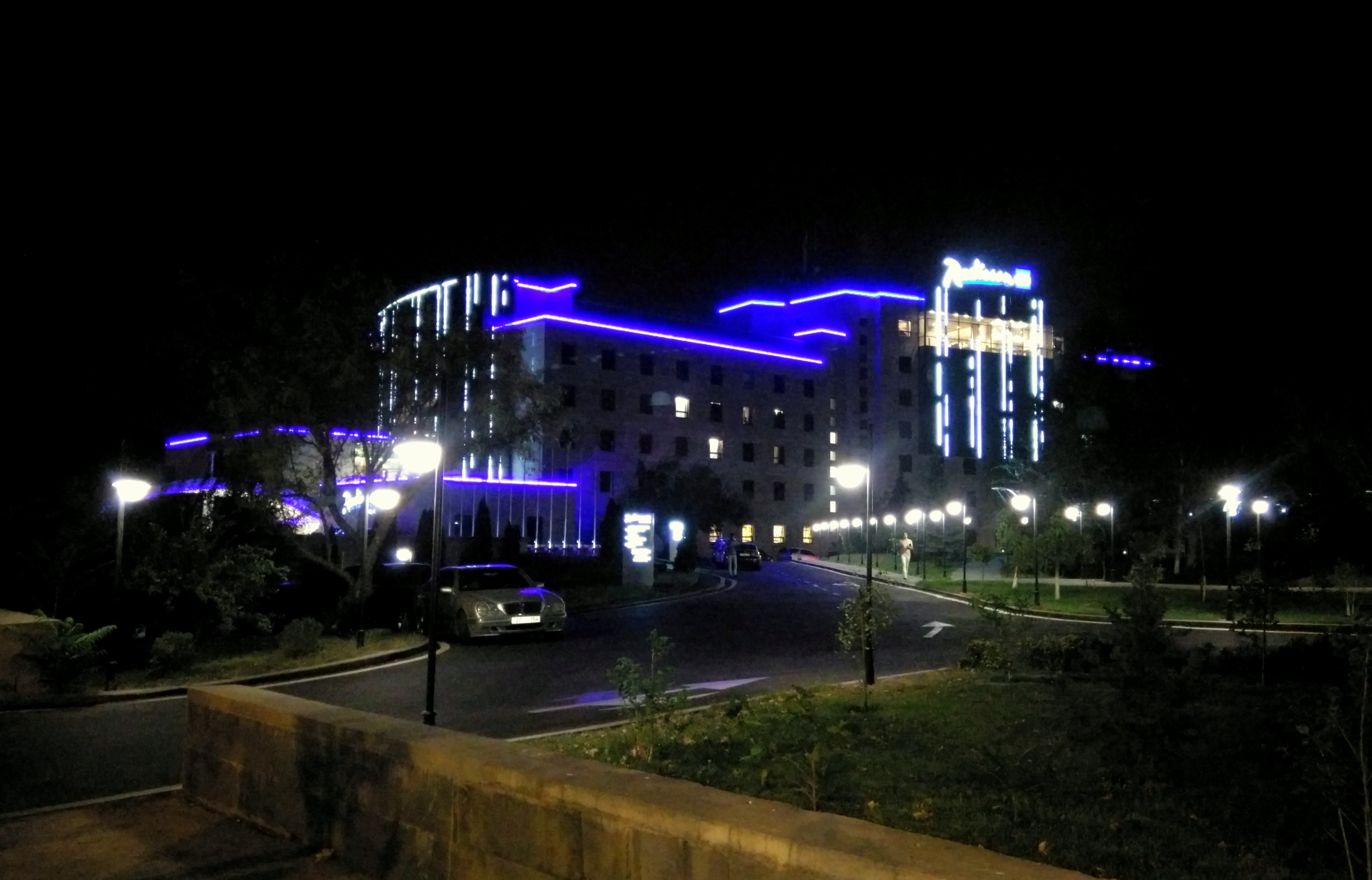
Radisson Blu Hotel

== Aruba ==
- Aruba Marriott Resort
- Radisson Aruba Resort, Casino & Spa

== Australia ==
- Australia Hotel, Sydney
- Buchanan's Hotel, Townsville
- Crown Perth
- Crown Melbourne
- Dick's Hotel, Sydney
- Grace Hotel, Sydney
- Harbour Rocks Hotel, Sydney
- Holiday Inn, Townsville
- Hotel Canberra
- Hotel Grand Chancellor, Hobart
- Hotel Grand Chancellor, Launceston
- Hotel Kurrajong, Canberra
- Hotel Windsor, Melbourne
- Hydro Majestic Hotel, Medlow Bath
- The Langham, Melbourne
- Manor Apartment Hotel, Brisbane
- Old Canberra Inn, Canberra
- The Old Woolstore Apartment Hotel, Hobart
- Palace Hotel, Perth
- Palazzo Versace Australia, Gold Coast, Queensland
- QT Canberra
- Raffles Hotel, Perth
- The Reef Hotel Casino, Cairns
- Regatta Hotel, Brisbane
- Sebel Townhouse Hotel, Sydney
- Shamrock Hotel, Bendigo
- The Star, Sydney
- The Star Gold Coast
- Victoria Hotel, Darwin
- White Bay Hotel, Sydney
- Wrest Point Hotel Casino, Hobart
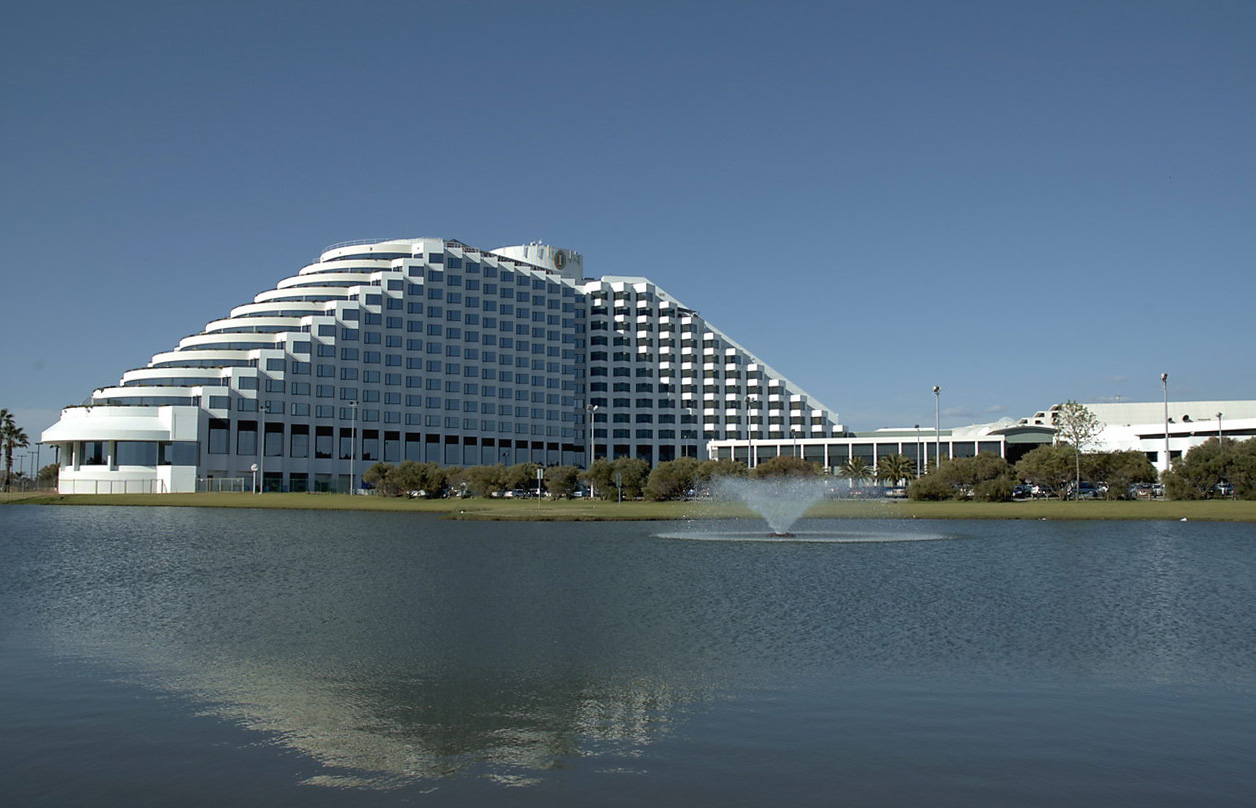
Crown Perth

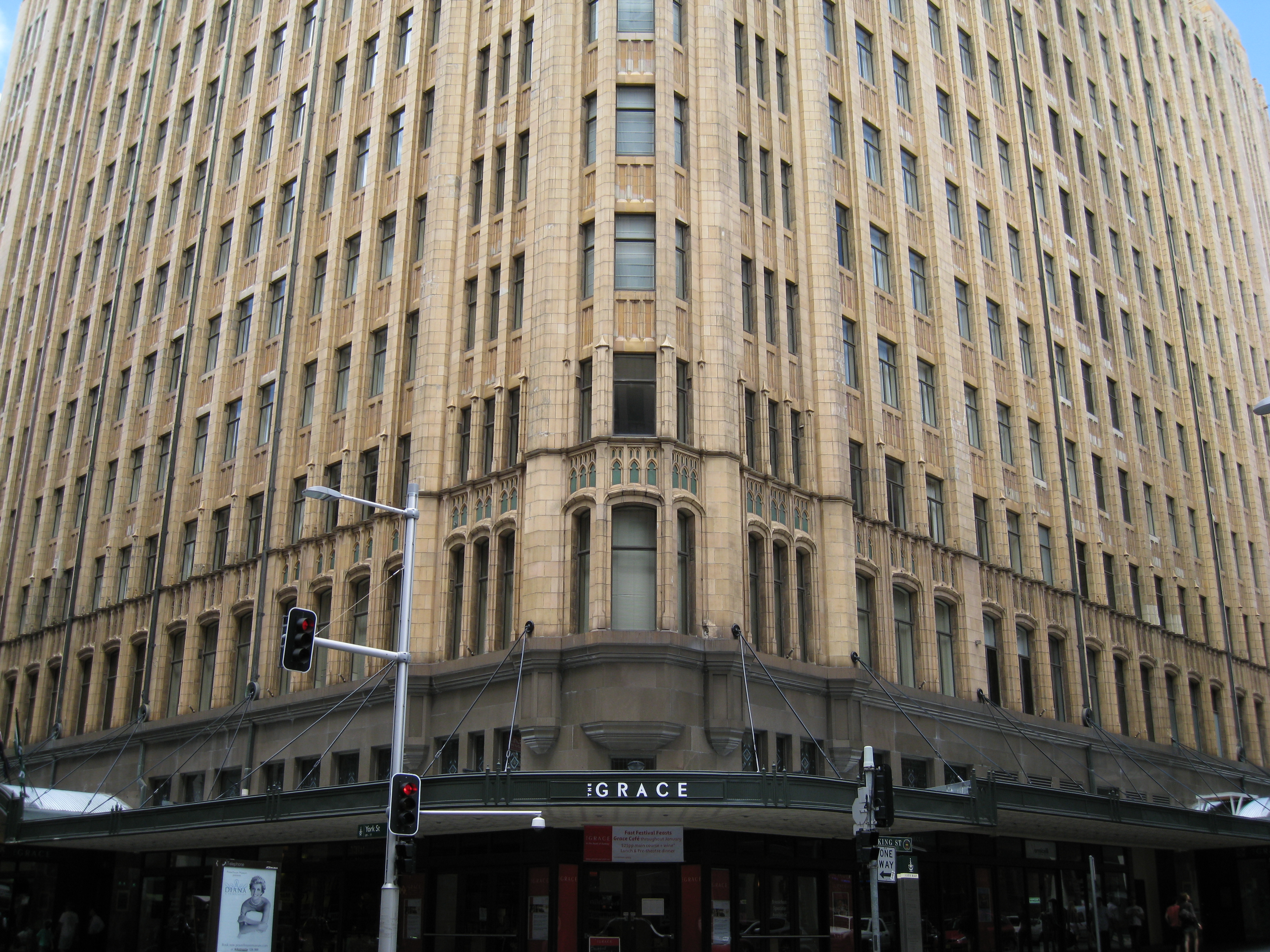
Grace Hotel

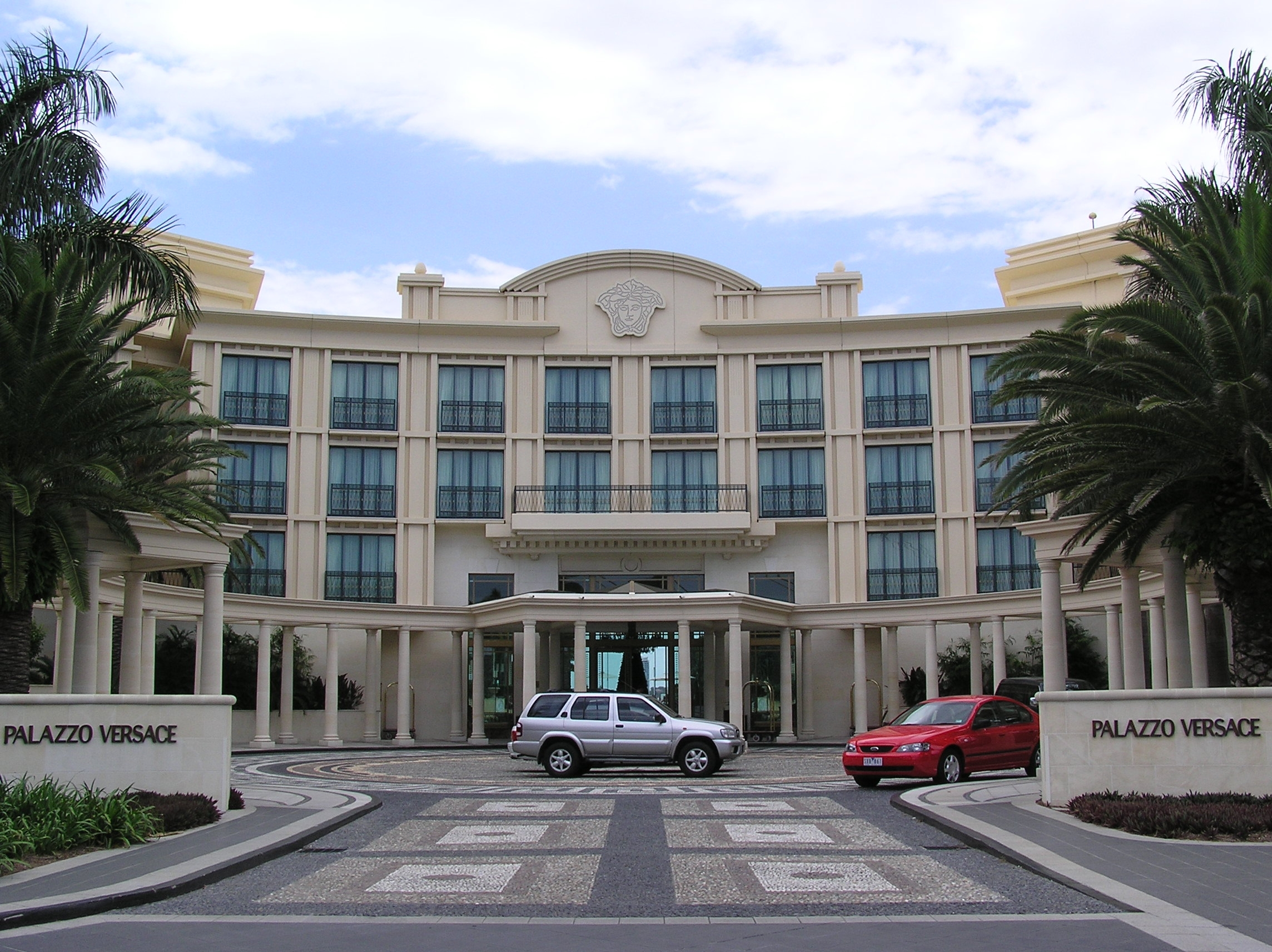
Palazzo Versace Australia

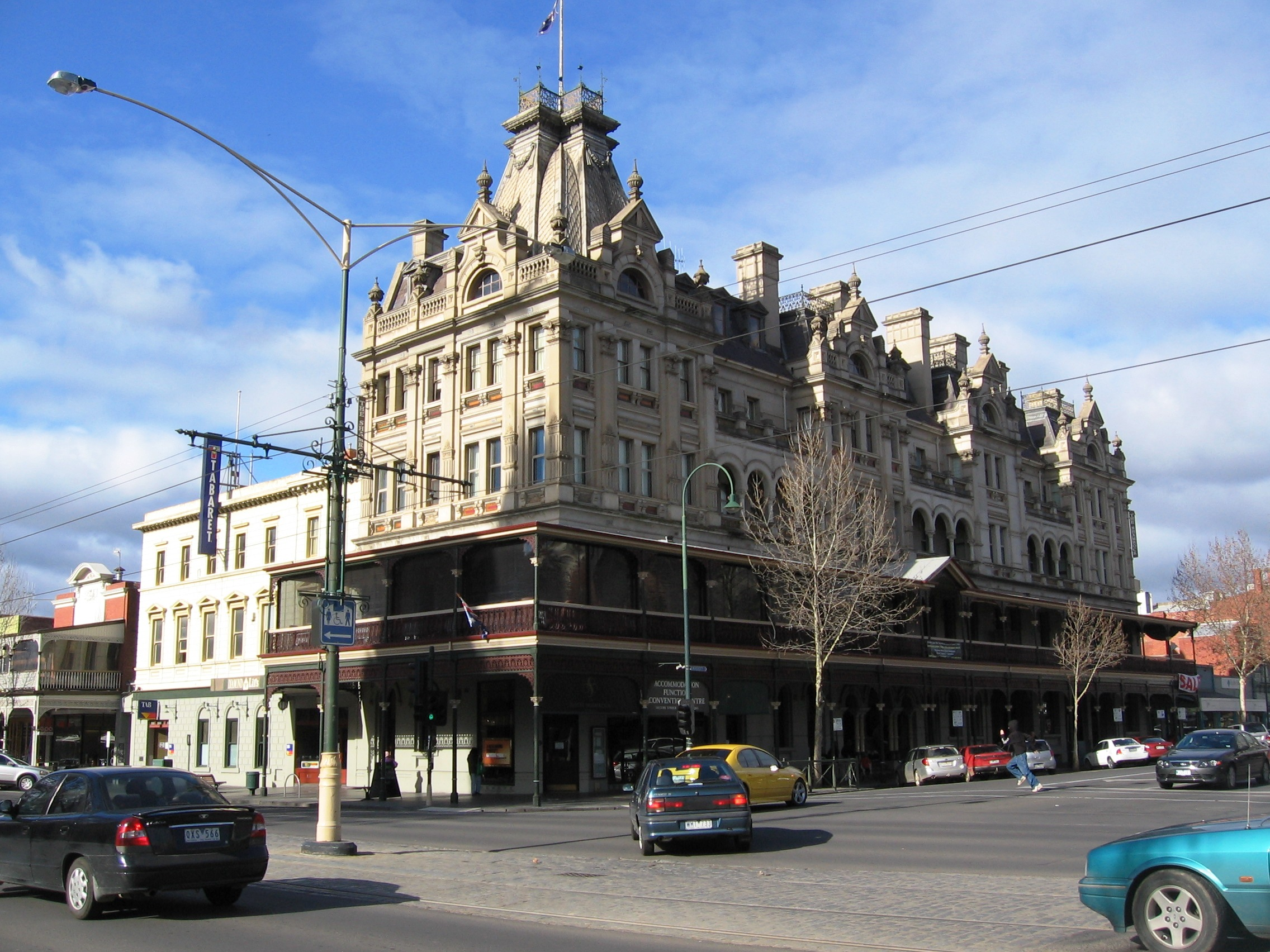
Shamrock Hotel, Bendigo

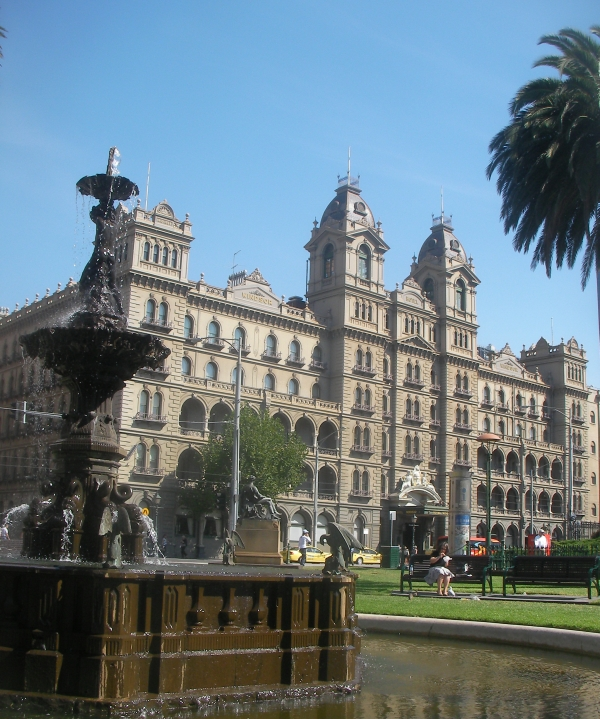
Hotel Windsor, Melbourne

== Austria ==
- Grand Hotel, Vienna
- Hotel Imperial, Vienna
- Hotel Metropole, Vienna
- Hotel Sacher, Vienna
- Hotel Sacher Salzburg, Salzburg
- Schloss Velden, Velden am Wörthersee
- Schloss Wilhelminenberg, Vienna
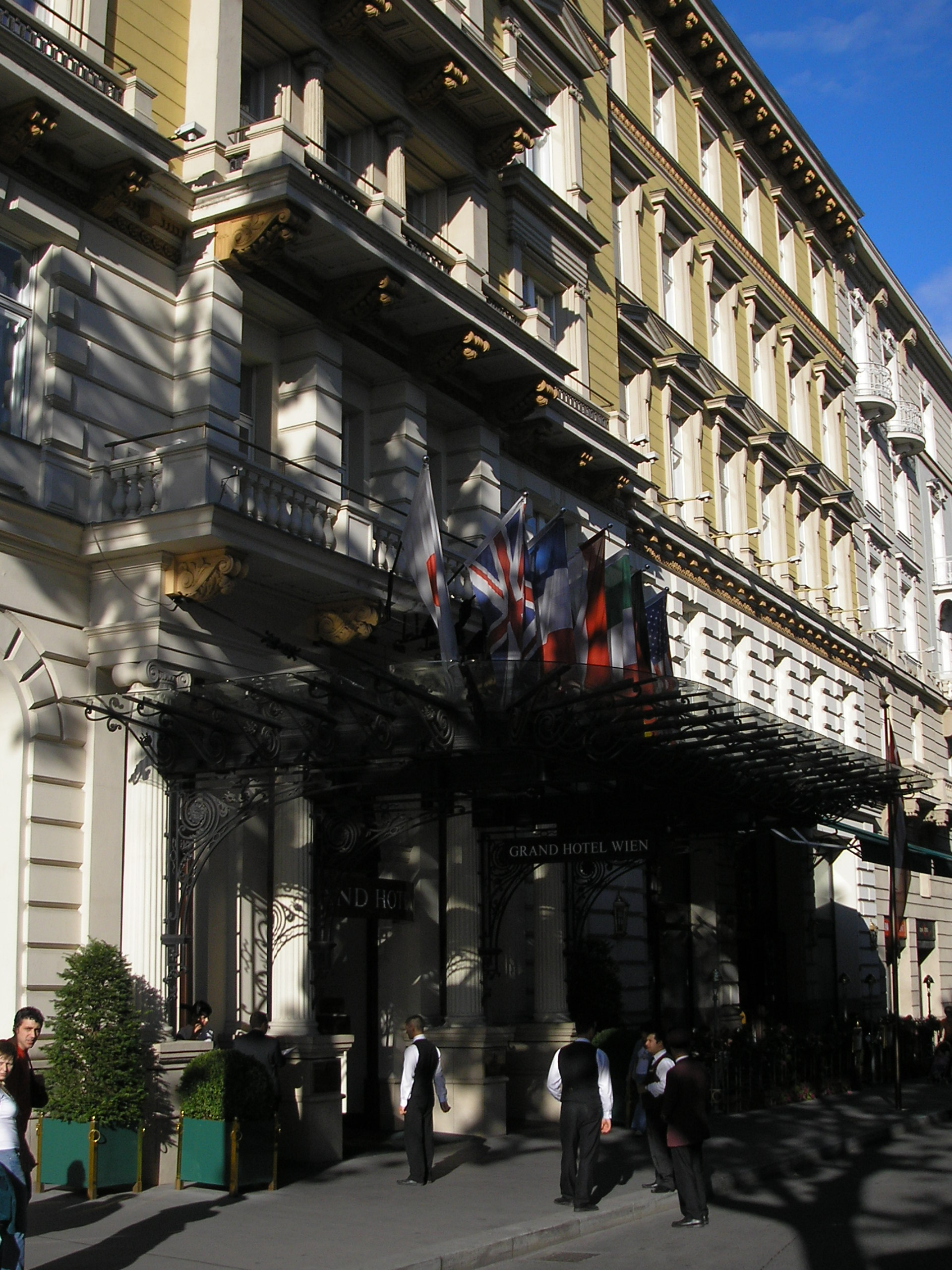
Grand Hotel, Vienna

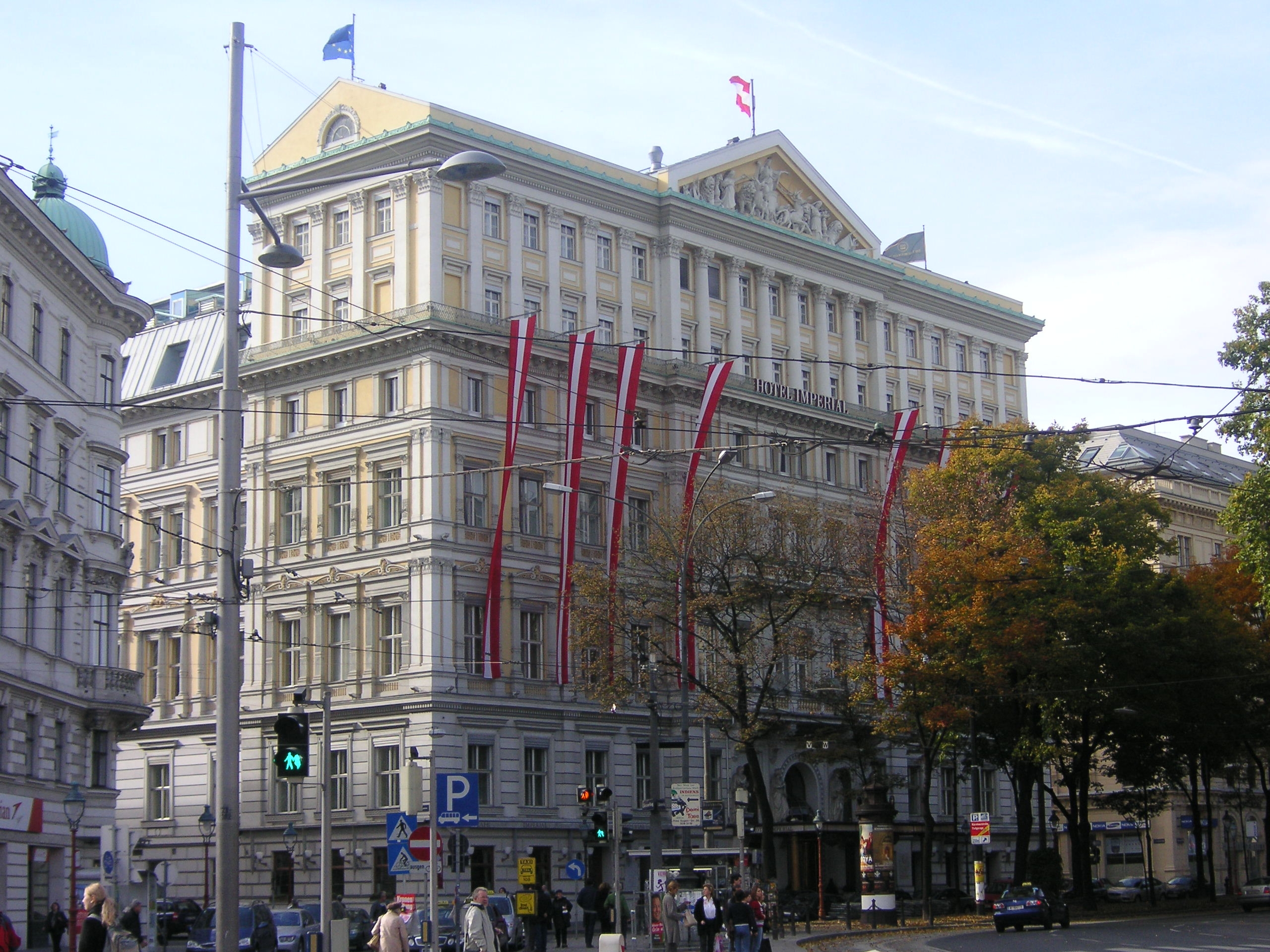
Hotel Imperial

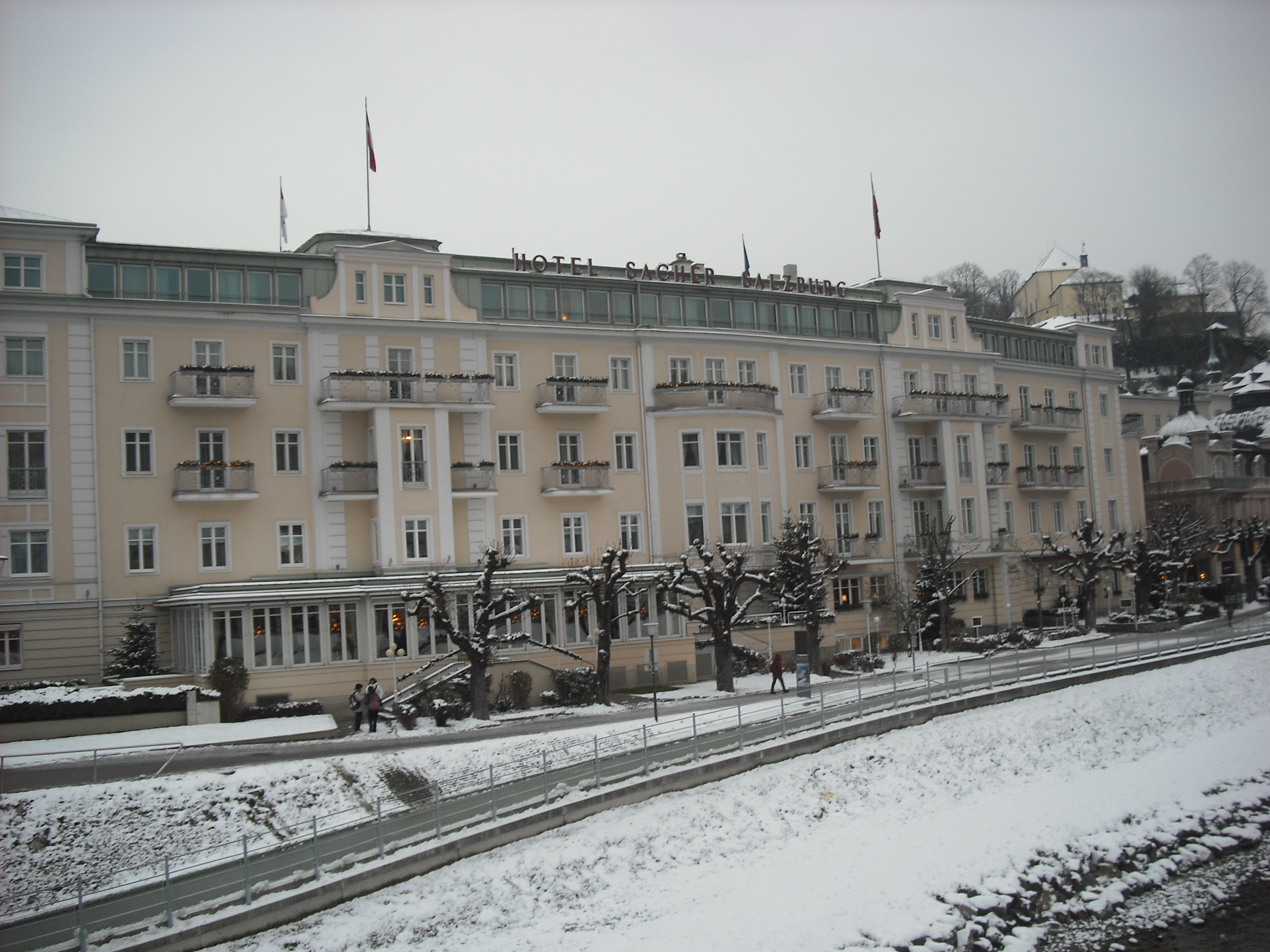
Hotel Sacher Salzburg

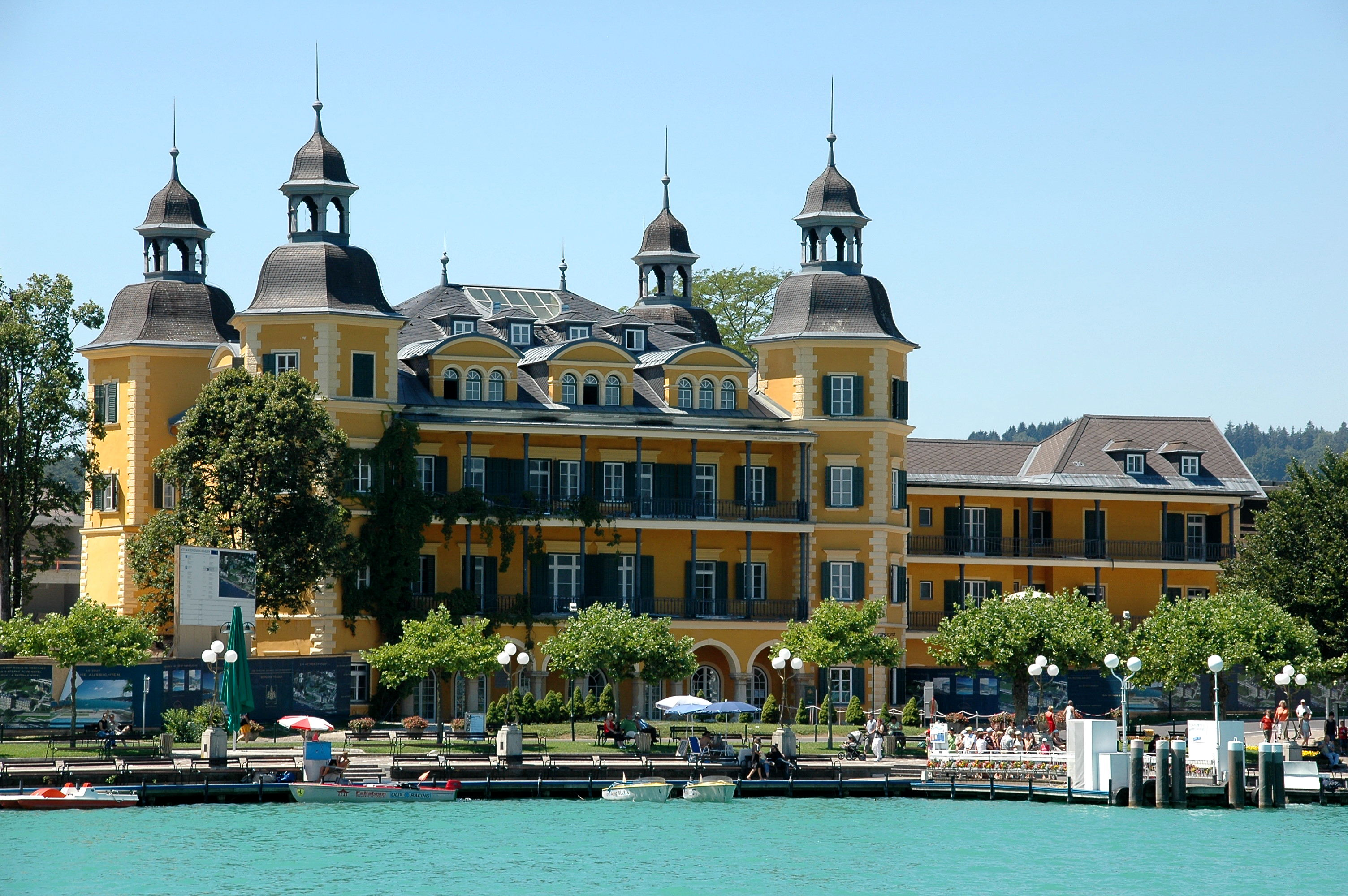
Schloss Velden

== Azerbaijan ==
- JW Marriott Absheron Baku Hotel, Baku
- AF Hotel, Novkhani, Baku
- Flame Towers, Baku
- Shaki Caravanserai, Sheki
JW Marriott Absheron Baku Hotel, Baku

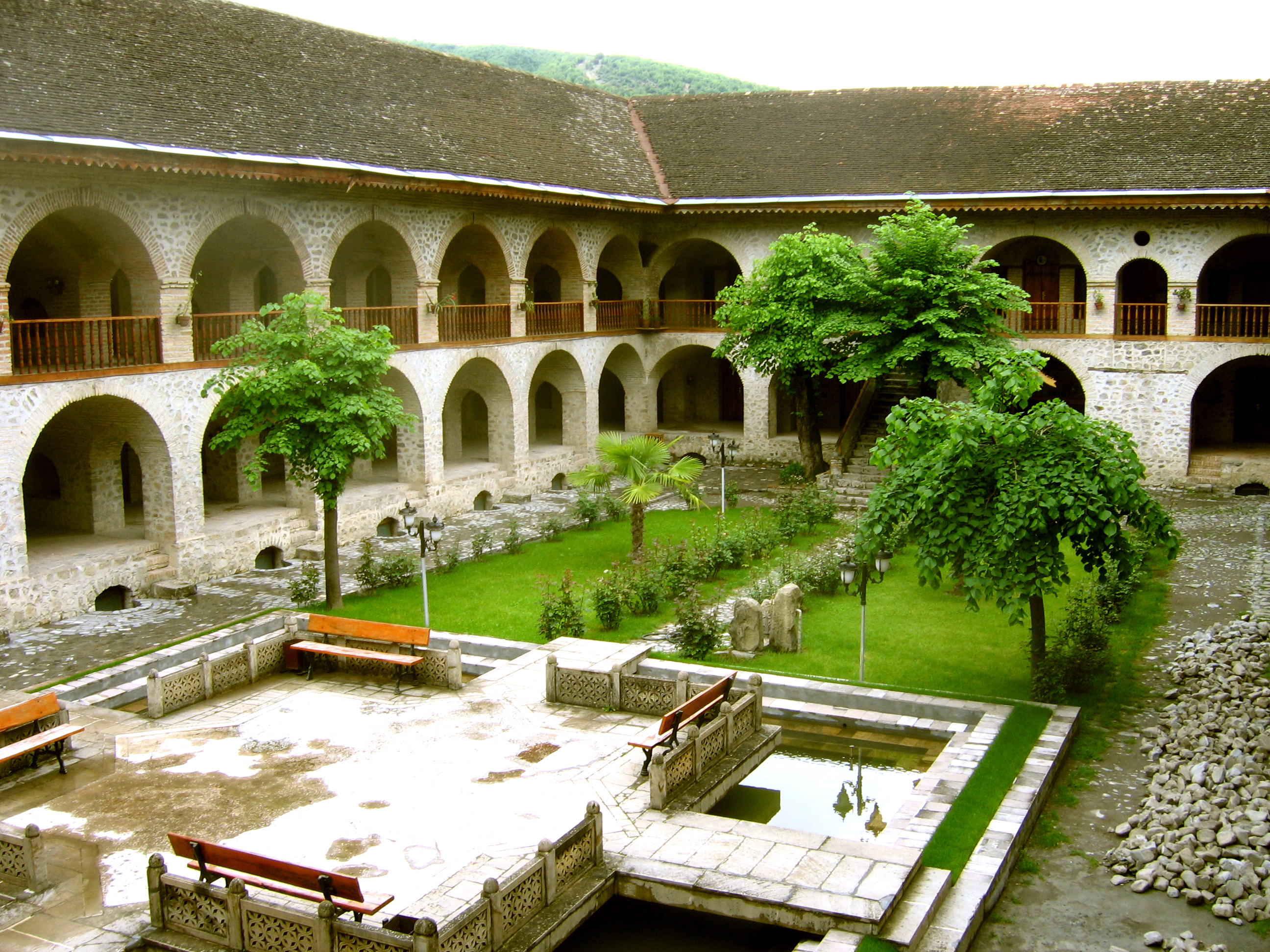
Shaki Caravanserai, Sheki

Flame Towers, Baku
