= Villavicencio (disambiguation) =

Villavicencio is a city and municipality in Colombia.

Villavicencio may also refer to:

- Centauros Villavicencio, Colombian football club
- Villavicencio de los Caballeros, municipality in Castile and León, Spain
- Hotel Villavicencio, hotel in Argentina

== People ==
- Antonio Villavicencio (1775–1816), Colombian governor
- Arturo Villavicencio, Ecuadorian scientist
- Diana Villavicencio (born 1985), Ecuadorian judoka
- Fernando Villavicencio (1963–2023), Ecuadoran politician
- Jorge Villavicencio (1958–2020), Guatemalan politician and physician
- Matías Villavicencio (born 1981), Argentine footballer
- Manuel Villavicencio (1834–1925), Peruvian naval officer
- Pedro Malo de Villavicencio, Spanish viceroy
- Pedro Nuñez de Villavicencio (1635–1700), Spanish Baroque painter
- Rosa Yolanda Villavicencio (born 1962), Colombian economist and politician
- Teófilo Villavicencio Marxuach (1912–1992), Puerto Rican journalist and politician
- Virgil Villavicencio, Filipino basketball player and coach
