= Marriott Constantine Hotel =

Hotel in Constantine, Algeria

Marriott Constantine
- Interactive map of the Marriott Constantine area

General information
- Location: Oued Rhumel Street, Constantine, Algeria
- Coordinates: 36°20′52.1″N 6°36′59.4″E
- Opening: 2014
- Owner: Société d’investissement Hôtelière
- Management: Marriott Hotels & Resorts

Other information
- Number of rooms: 180
- Number of suites: 20
- Number of restaurants: 2
- Public transit access: Tram, Line 1

Website
- Official website

The Marriott Constantine Hotel is a hotel in Constantine, Algeria. It is rated in the 5 stars international category, and is decorated in an Arabic-Moorish style.

The hotel was renovated in 2018 with the assistance of architects Fabris & Partners of Latisana, Italy. The renovation included addition of multiple swimming pools by Myrtha pools company.

The hotel has 180 rooms, distributed as 160 standard rooms, 10 executive suites, 10 senior suites and a presidential suite. located within four consecutive blocks that adapt to the underlying ground, connected in between through vertical elements that contain stairs and elevators.

== See also ==
- List of hotels in Algeria
- Grand Hotel Cirta
