= Mihanovich =

Mihanovich is a surname. Notable people with the surname include:

- Nicolás Mihanovich (1846–1929), Argentine businessman
- Sandra Mihanovich (born 1957), Argentine musician
- Sergio Mihanovich (1937–2012), Argentine musician
