= Hotel Sacher Salzburg =

Hotel in Salzburg, Austria

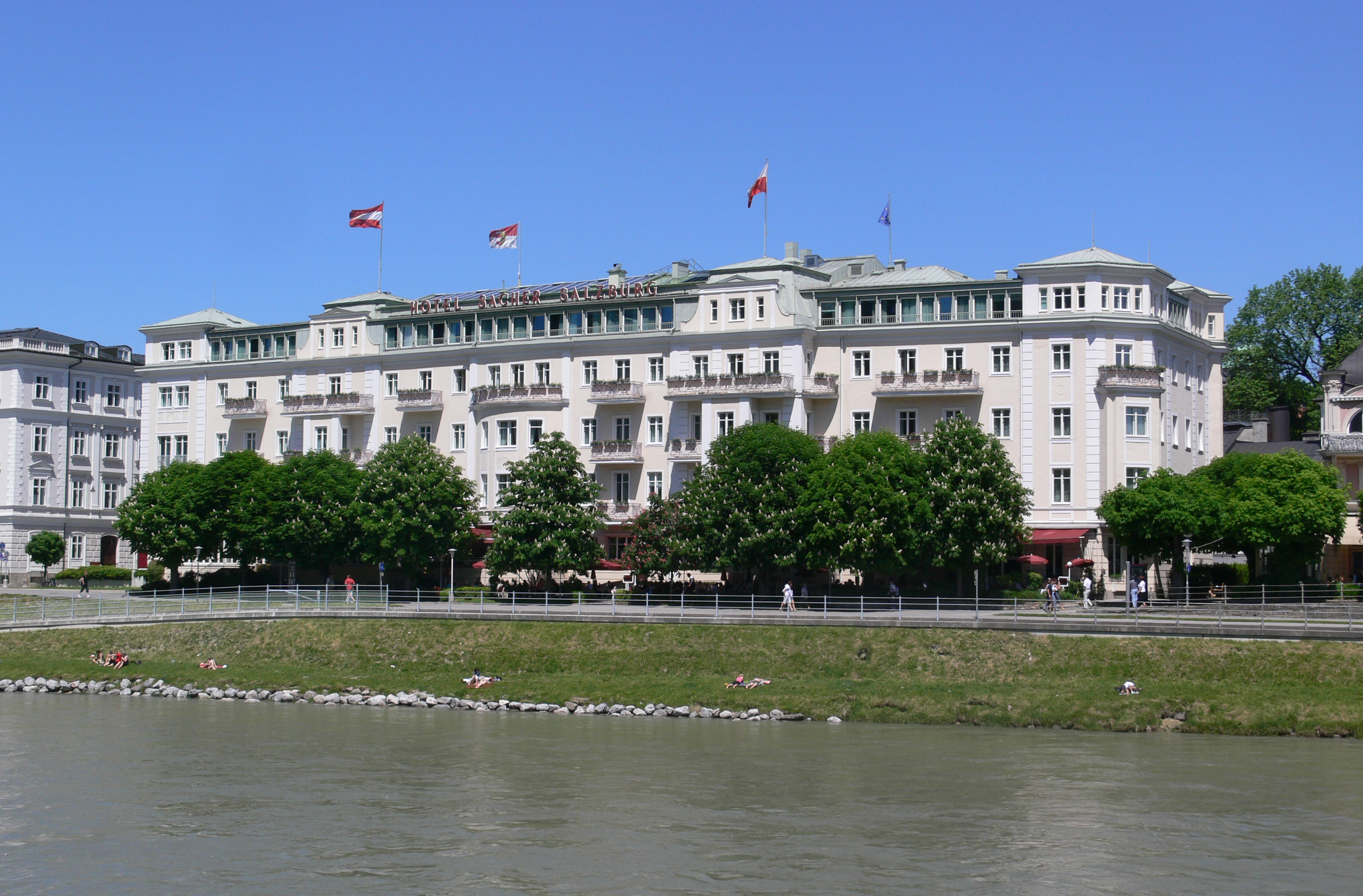
The Hotel Sacher in Salzburg, Austria

The Hotel Sacher Salzburg in Austria is a 5 star luxury hotel and Salzburg's only grand hotel. The house is built in the style of the turn of the century, and is located on the right bank of the Salzach river opposite the Historic Centre of the City of Salzburg, which is a UNESCO World Heritage, and Hohensalzburg Fortress. The hotel is part of the Sacher hotel group and is known for serving the Original Sachertorte.

== History ==
The building that houses Hotel Sacher Salzburg was developed after the regulation of the Salzach river in the first half of the 19th century, which created new building land in Salzburg. Built by Carl von Schwarz, the hotel was completed after approximately three years of construction and sold in 1866 to Karl (II.) Karl Irresberger, who opened it on 4 June 1866 as Hôtel d’Autriche with 66 rooms.

Later renamed Hotel Österreichischer Hof the property became one of Salzburg’s established hotels and hosted guests from the worlds of politics, culture and society. The hotel developed a close association with the Salzburg Festival, founded in 1920, due to its location near the festival venues and its role in the city’s cultural life.

From 1945 to 1955, the hotel was used as an officers' hotel by the United States occupation forces.

In March 1965, The Beatles held a press conference at the Österreichischer Hof while in Salzburg for the filming of Help! in Obertauern.

In 1988, Peter Gürtler, owner of Hotel Sacher Wien, acquired the Österreichischer Hof. Following a major renovation programme, the hotel was renamed Hotel Sacher Salzburg in 2000 and became part of the Sacher hotel group. Today, the hotel is owned by the Winkler and Gürtler families. Renovation work was also carried out between 2014 and 2021 included the creation of the Sacher Sky Suite, which opened in July 2021.

== Salzburg Festival association ==
The hotel has a historical association with the Salzburg Festival, founded in 1920 by Max Reinhardt, Hugo von Hofmannsthal and Richard Strauss.All three stayed at the hotel during the period in which it was known as the Österreichischer Hof. Their names are recorded in the hotel's guestbook, and Reinhardt is documented as having visited the Österreichischer Hof on several occasions.

== Amenities ==
Hotel Sacher Salzburg occupies a 19th-century building on the banks of the Salzach, facing Salzburg's historic centre. The hotel has 110 rooms and suites, designed by co-owner Alexandra Winkler in collaboration with French designer Pierre-Yves Rochon.

The hotel's restaurants include the Zirbelzimmer and Restaurant Sacher Grill, alongside Café Sacher Salzburg and the Sacher Bar. The Zirbelzimmer retains an interior dating to the hotel's opening in 1866.

Café Sacher Salzburg serves the Original Sachertorte, which originated in Vienna in 1832 and is attributed to confectioner Franz Sacher.

== Recognition ==
Hotel Sacher Salzburg received a One Michelin Key distinction in the 2024, 2025 and 2026 selections of the Michelin Guide. The hotel was also recognised in the Condé Nast Traveler Readers' Choice Awards in 2024, 2025 and 2026.
