= Hotel Casa Lucia =

Hotel in Buenos Aires

Coordinates: 34°35′30″S 58°22′44″W

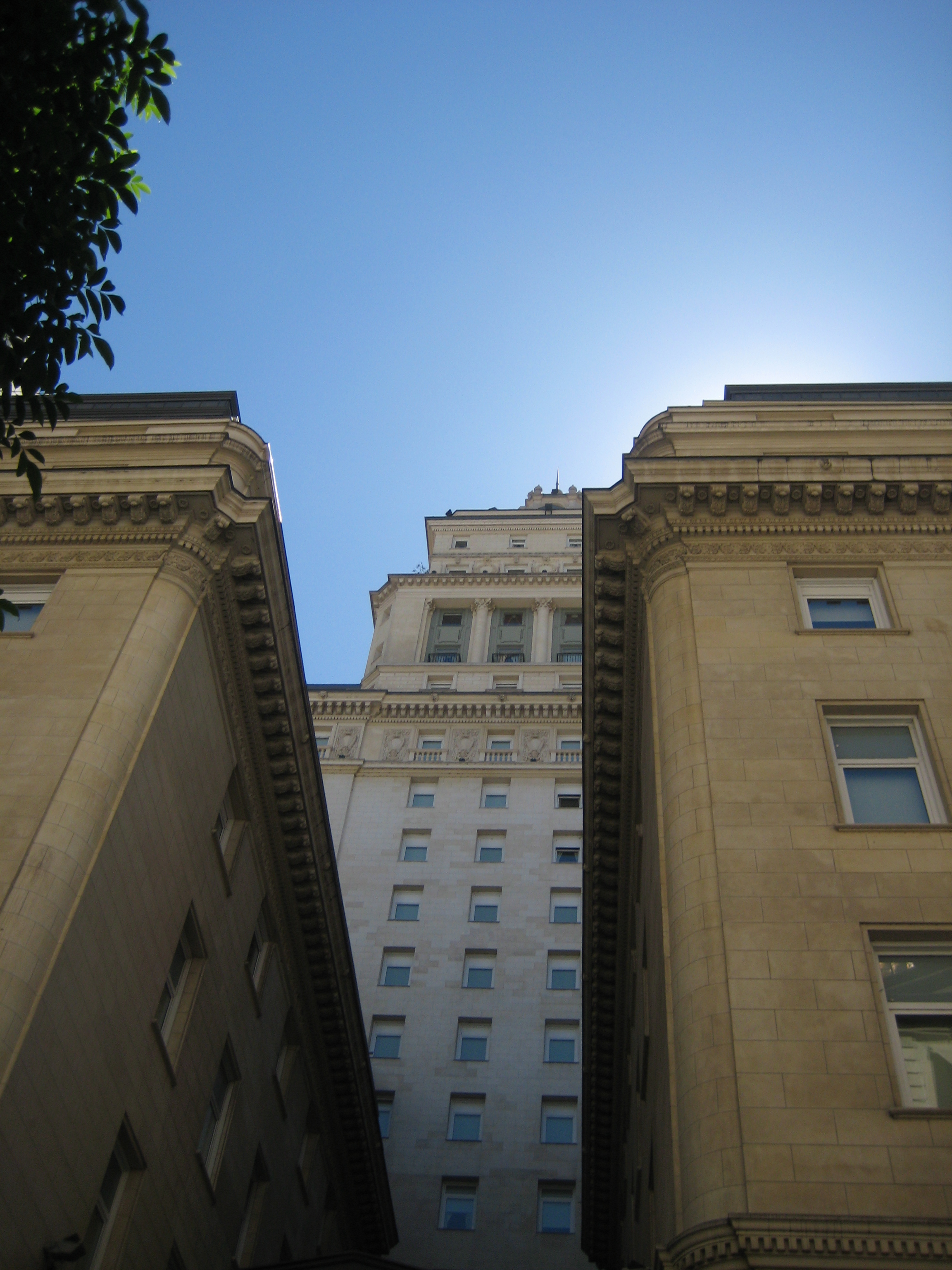
Hotel Casa Lucia

The Hotel Casa Lucia is a five star hotel in the Retiro section of Buenos Aires.

== Overview ==
The 20-story structure was built as an office building by local shipping magnate Nicolás Mihanovich. Its location allowed him to look out towards the Río de la Plata, where his steam ships could be seen plying the waters between Buenos Aires and Colonia del Sacramento, Uruguay. Inspired in part by the Tomb of Mausolus of Caria, the eclecticist building was designed by the local architectural studio of Calvo, Jacobs and Giménez, and was opened in 1929, shortly after Mihanovich's death.

The tallest building in Argentina and Latin America at the time, the 80-meter tower remained a city landmark even after its height was superseded by the nearby Kavanagh Building in 1936. The first building in Argentina to include in-wall wind braces, much of the uppermost roofing and façade and made from ship hull portions. It was later sold to its builders, the Bencich family, and became a residential complex. The tower gradually declined with the proliferation of upscale, balconied highrises in subsequent decades, however.

Nearly abandoned, the building was acquired in 2000 by hospitality giant Accor to house Argentina's first Sofitel Hotel. Designed by local studio Daniel Fernández & Associates and decorated by Pierre-Yves Rochon, its refurbishment was accompanied by the construction of a 10 m (33 ft) basement for a pool, gym and parking garage. A T-shaped alley resulting from the two adjacent 5-story wings was covered by a glass roof and converted into a black-and-white marble-tiled lobby (notable also for a 0.6-ton, 4-meter {13-ft} bronze spiderweb chandelier). Opened in January 2003 as Sofitel Buenos Aires, the hotel has 144 rooms, business facilities, a literary café and Le Sud, a Provençal restaurant.

The hotel closed on 17 December 2017, due to the termination of the contract with the owner of the property. [4]It reopened in January 2024 as Hotel Casa Lucia.
