= Four Seasons Hotel London at Park Lane =

Hotel in London

- Interactive map of the Four Seasons Hotel London at Park Lane area

General information
- Location: Hamilton Place, London, England, United Kingdom
- Coordinates: 51.50397°N 0.14982°W

Technical details
- Floor count: 11

Other information
- Number of rooms: 196 (including 47 suites)

Website
- www.fourseasons.com/london/

Four Seasons Hotel London at Park Lane is a luxury 5-star hotel in London, England. It is located near Hyde Park corner in central London. It was built in 1970 as the Inn on the Park London.

Until 2007 the hotel was owned by Saudi Prince Alwaleed bin Talal's Kingdom Hotel Investments. Then the royal family of Bahrain, Al Khalifa, bought it for £100m.

The hotel was reopened in 2010 after an extensive two year redevelopment costing an estimated £125 million. The work included a new floor, Italian restaurant Amaranto, and an interior redesign by Pierre-Yves Rochon.
