= Buchanan's Hotel =

Hotels in Townsville

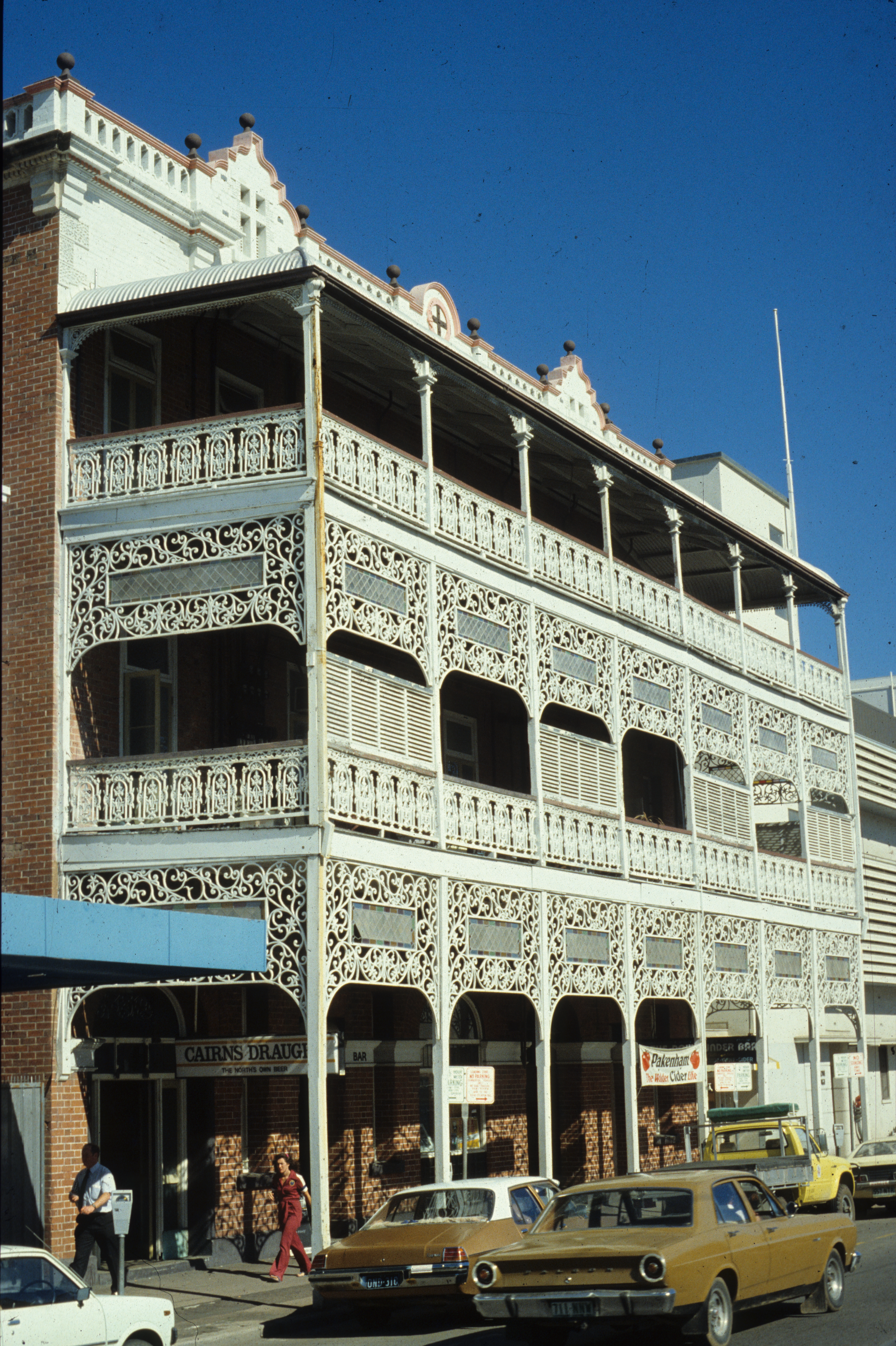
- Buchanan's hotel in 1979, from the University of Queensland Architecture Library.
- Interactive map of the Buchanan's Hotel area
- Former names: Prince of Wales (1902–1903)

General information
- Type: Hotel
- Architectural style: Federation Filigree
- Location: Australia, 12 Sturt Street; Townsville, QLD
- Coordinates: 19°15′28.24″S 146°49′02.36″E
- Construction started: 1902
- Completed: 1903
- Destroyed: 1982
- Cost: £12000 (in 1913)
- Owner: David Buchanan (1903–1913)

Technical details
- Floor count: 3

David Buchanan (1842–1913), owner and namesake of Buchanan's Hotel.

Buchanan's Hotel (nicknamed "Buchs") was a hotel on Sturt Street located in the CBD of Townsville, Queensland, Australia. The three-storey structure, with an ornate three storey cast iron verandah, was completed in 1903. It was used as a hotel up to World War II, and then during the war housed American officers. It caught fire and was largely destroyed in 1982.

== Construction and early history ==
Buchanan's Hotel in Townsville was built in 1903, and featured an ornate three storey verandah in timber with elaborate cast-iron panels, the upper sections imitating wrought iron, with stained-glass insets. It was named for its owner, David Buchanan, who built it to replace his previous hotel, Prince of Wales, which sat on the same spot and was destroyed by fire in April 1902. Initially named the Prince of Wales after its predecessor, David Buchanan's pride in his building was such that in May 1903, he officially changed its name to match his own. The building, of three storeys, was later described as being "decorated with splendid ironwork".

Buchanan, a first-generation Scottish immigrant who owned multiple hotels in his lifetime, spared no expense in the construction of his eponymous pub: Buchanan's featured high-ceilinged bedrooms, gas lighting, electric bells to summon staff members and running water to wash stands in every room. It also contained a five-hundred square foot dining saloon, and the wrought-iron lacework facade was created by Green's Foundry in Townsville. Its construction cost £12000, and it was the last hotel David Buchanan built before his death in 1913. He claimed that it stood "easily first in north Queensland", though commentators have suggested this claim might have been overstated slightly.

The architecture was a particularly notable feature of Buchanan's, one that would later lead to its display on an Australia Post stamp. Dorothy and Bruce Gibson-Wilde note this in their 1988 book, A Pattern of Pubs: Hotels of Townsville 1864-1914:

Townsville's two most elaborate hotel buildings, the Queen's and Buchanan's, were designed in the same year (1902). Both mixed the exposed brick and painted plaster detailing of the Federation era with iron lace, more typical of the nineteenth century. Buchanan's was justly famous for its superb cast and wrought iron.

== The Second World War and Lyndon Johnson ==
Lyndon Johnson, later to become United States President, stayed at Buchanan's on 8 June 1942 when it was a lodging for American officers during World War II – a visit which he repeated during a Presidential tour of Australia on 23 October 1966. On that same day, he mentioned the hotel in his speech to a Townsville crowd estimated at 50,000.

== After the Second World War ==
After the war, the hotel was abandoned and left standing empty, and by the 1960s the top story was unstable and unusable. In 1973, it was featured on an Australian postal stamp as part of a series of stamps depicting beautiful buildings. Other buildings featured included the Sydney Opera House, Como House in Melbourne and St. James Church in Sydney.

In 1982, the hotel was gutted by a fire, leaving only the exterior and internal walls standing. The current owner, developer Bill Spee, has announced plans to build a "green" office block on the site.

== Notable guests ==
Buchanan's hosted a number of notable Australians and others during its history, including:

- American heiress and princess Mary Elsie Moore
- Actor Claude Bantock
- Cricketer Sir Donald Bradman
- United States President Lyndon Baines Johnson
