= Mazar Hotel =

Hotel in Mazar-e-Sharif, Afghanistan

Coordinates: 36.7000°N 67.1167°E

- Interactive map of the Mazar Hotel area

General information
- Location: Mazar-e-Sharif, Afghanistan

Mazar Hotel is a hotel in Mazar-e-Sharif, Afghanistan. The hotel is decorated in 1930s decor, featuring all high ceilings, grand dining rooms and pillars. Described as a "medium-class" hotel", despite being one of the city's best hotels, in the late 1970s the hotel was said to also accommodate for campers.
