= The Old Woolstore Apartment Hotel =

Coordinates: 42.879767°S 147.333556°E

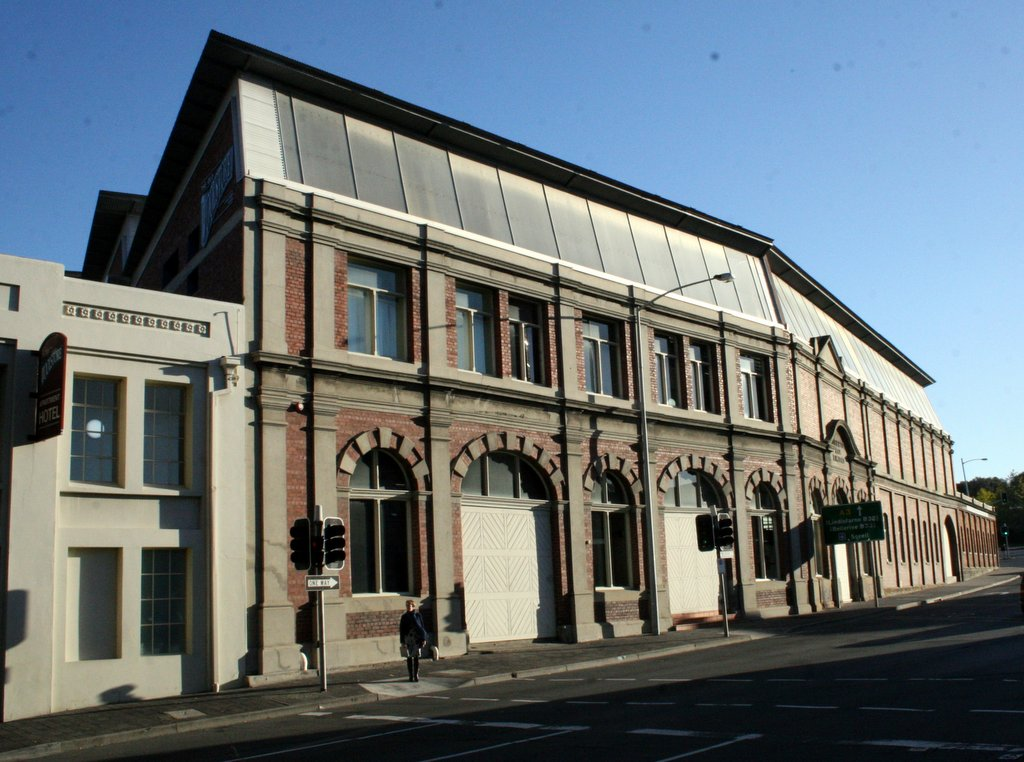
The Old Woolstore Apartment Hotel

The Old Woolstore Apartment Hotel is in Hobart, Tasmania, Australia.

== History ==
Originally, the site was used for shanty housing, before being turned into a wool storage and treatment facility around 1900. Wool was brought in to be pressed, then shipped to Hobart. The top floor of the building was used for wool treatment and therefore required the natural light offered by the saw-tooth roof line. The Old Woolstore was awarded the "Best Redeveloped Industrial Building" in 1997 by the National Trust. The original floors have been maintained.
