= Upper Caravanserai (Shaki) =

1800s roadside inn in Azerbaijan, now part of a hotel

- Yuxarı Karvansaray
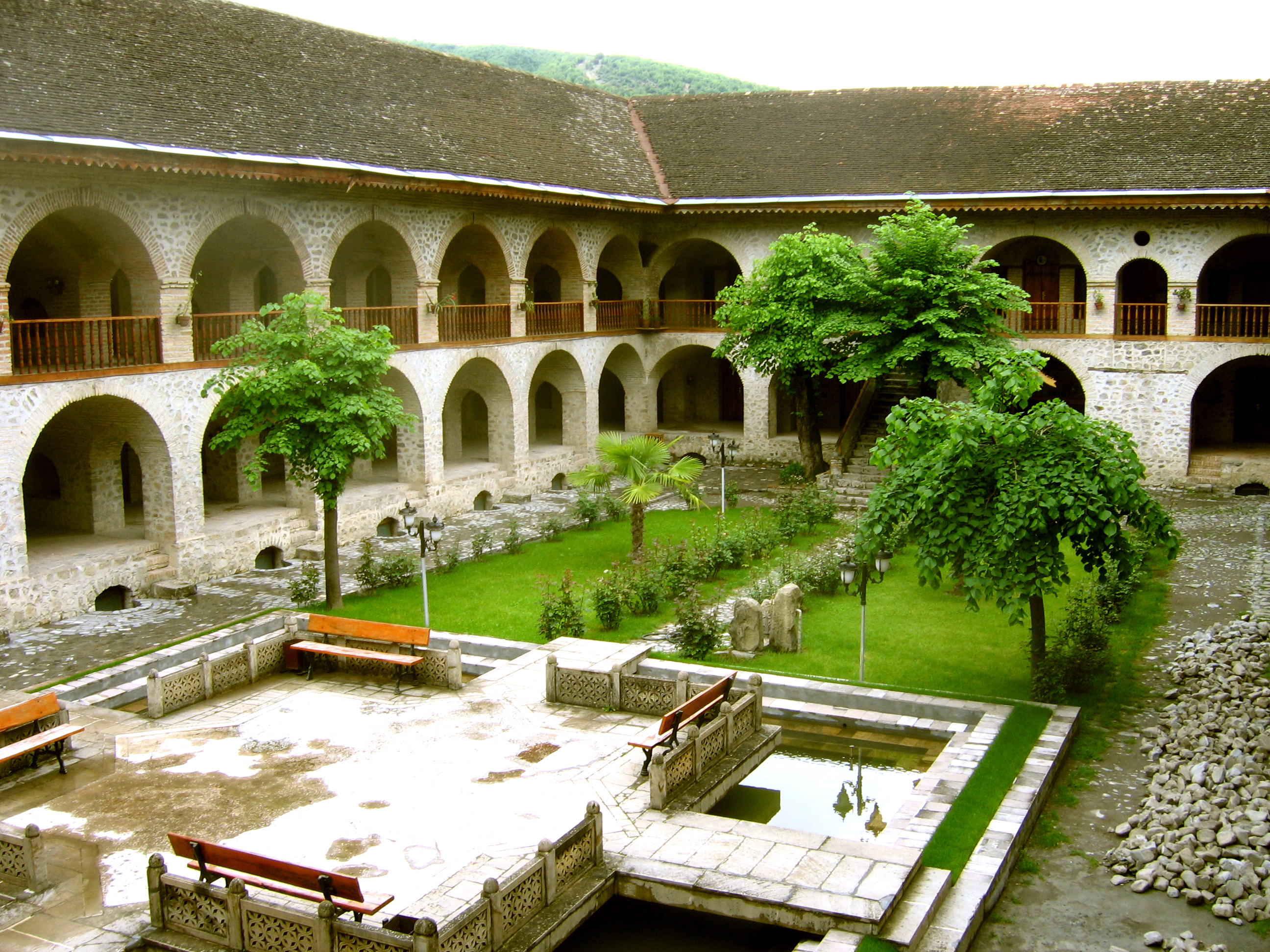

General information
- Location: Sheki, Azerbaijan
- Coordinates: 41°12′3.23″N 47°11′37.17″E
- Completed: 19th century

The Upper Caravanserai (Azerbaijani: Yuxarı Karvansaray) is a historical monument in Sheki, Azerbaijan. A part of the building is now used as a hotel.

== Historical information ==
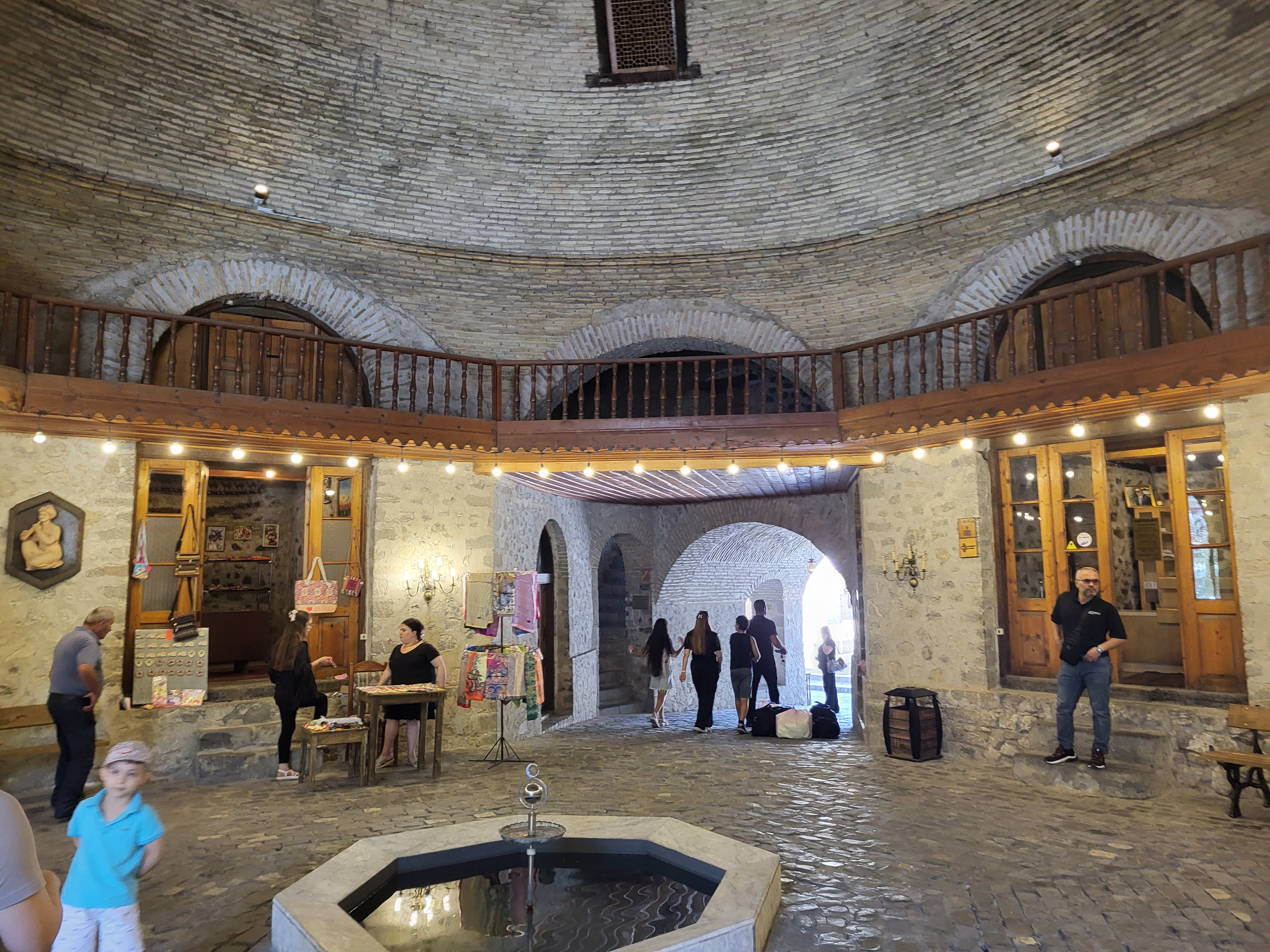
Inner entrance

Swift development of trade in the Middle Ages enhanced the importance of caravanserais in the territory of Azerbaijan, favoring the construction of new ones. Generally, caravanserais were built in form of fortified structures with a single gate. During dangerous incidents the gate could be closed, rendering the building impregnable.

The “Caravanserai” historical complex in Sheki consists of two magnificent caravanserais, traditionally named “Yukhary” and “Ashaghy” caravanserais, which in Azerbaijani signify the "Upper" and "Lower" Caravanserai, respectively. Construction of these caravanserais is dated to the 18th–19th centuries AD.

== Upper caravanserai ==
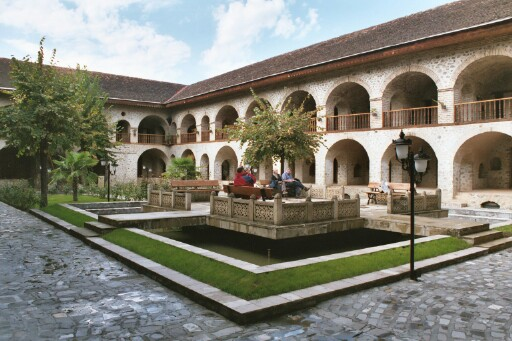
View of the inside

The "Upper" caravanserai has a rectangular shape with a large inner courtyard, in the centre of which is a pool. The total area of the caravanserai is 8,000 m^{2} (86,000 sq ft) and its dimensions are 55 m × 85 m (180 ft × 279 ft). Four entrances lead to the yard from the four corners of the building. There are 242 rooms.

Historically, there were merchant shops and storage rooms in the coaching inn, but the first floor was intended for guests to whom the rooms were leased. Each room had a hole which was connected to the ground floor with a stepladder, which made it easier for merchants the monitor the security of their goods.

Since 1988, the upper caravanserai is used as a hotel complex for tourists, guests of the city and local residents. There is a restaurant of national cuisine that seats 100 guests. There are luxury suites in compliance with international standards in the hotel.

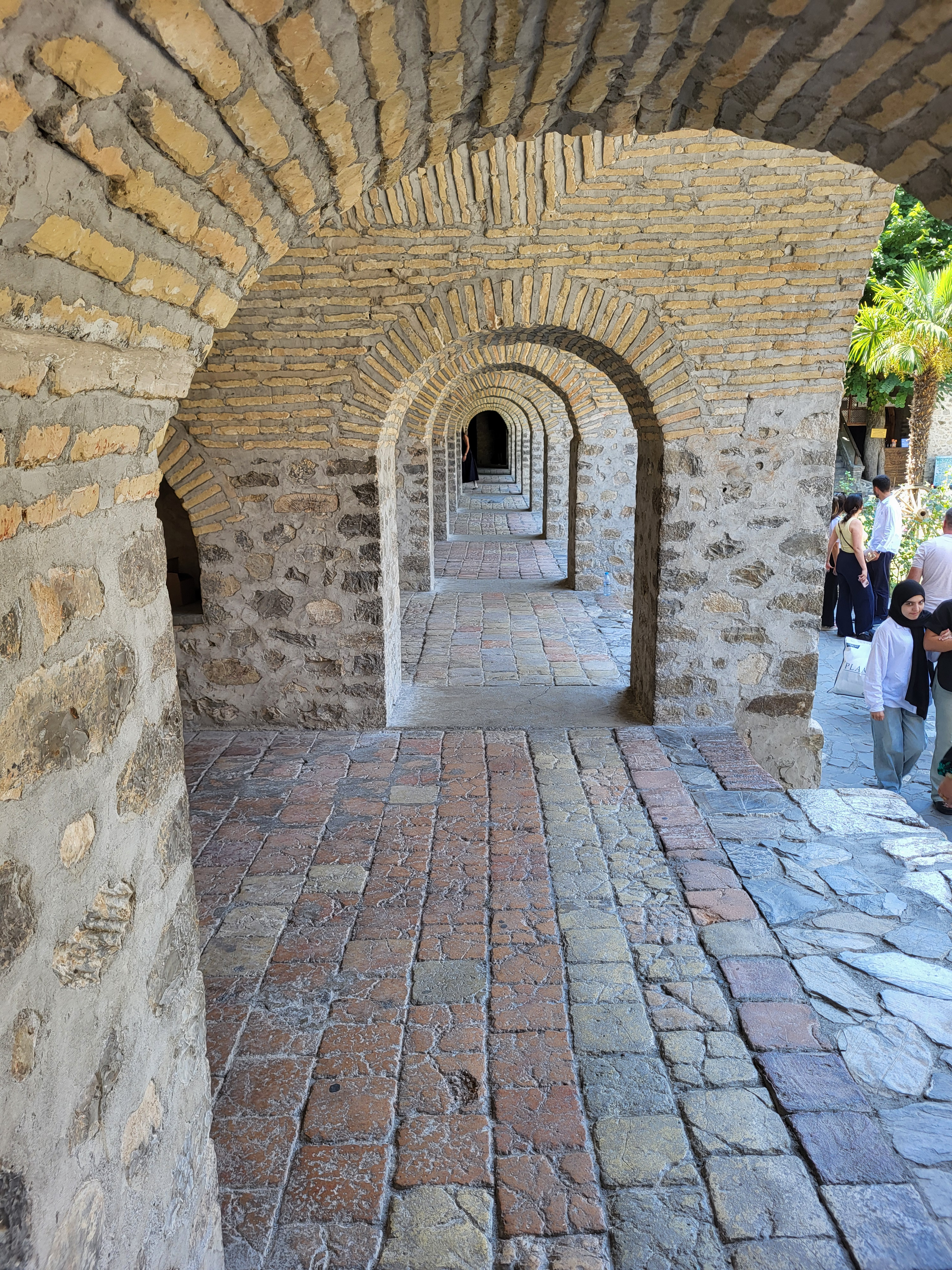
Upper corridor

== Lower caravanserai ==
The "Lower" caravanserai is located on more uneven terrain as the Gurjan River runs nearby. It has a trapezoidal floor plan with a total area of 6,000 m^{2} (65,000 sq ft). The front façade of the building overlooks the street and has a height of 14 m (46 ft), but the inner façade is 8 m (26 ft) tall. There are about 300 rooms and store rooms in the upper part of the caravanserai. Unlike the upper caravanserai, the lower caravanserai isn't used as a hotel. It attracts tourists as a historical and architectural monument and local sightseeing.
