= Arturo Villavicencio =

Ecuadorian environmental researcher

Arturo Villavicencio is an Ecuadorian environmental researcher. He was nominated by Denmark in 1995 for the Intergovernmental Panel on Climate Change (IPCC) and contributed to its fourth assessment report. The work of the IPCC, including the contributions of many scientists, was recognised by the joint award of the 2007 Nobel Peace Prize to the IPCC and Al Gore.
