= Royal Hotel (Oran) =

Hotel in Algeria

Coordinates: 35.7033°N 0.6478°W

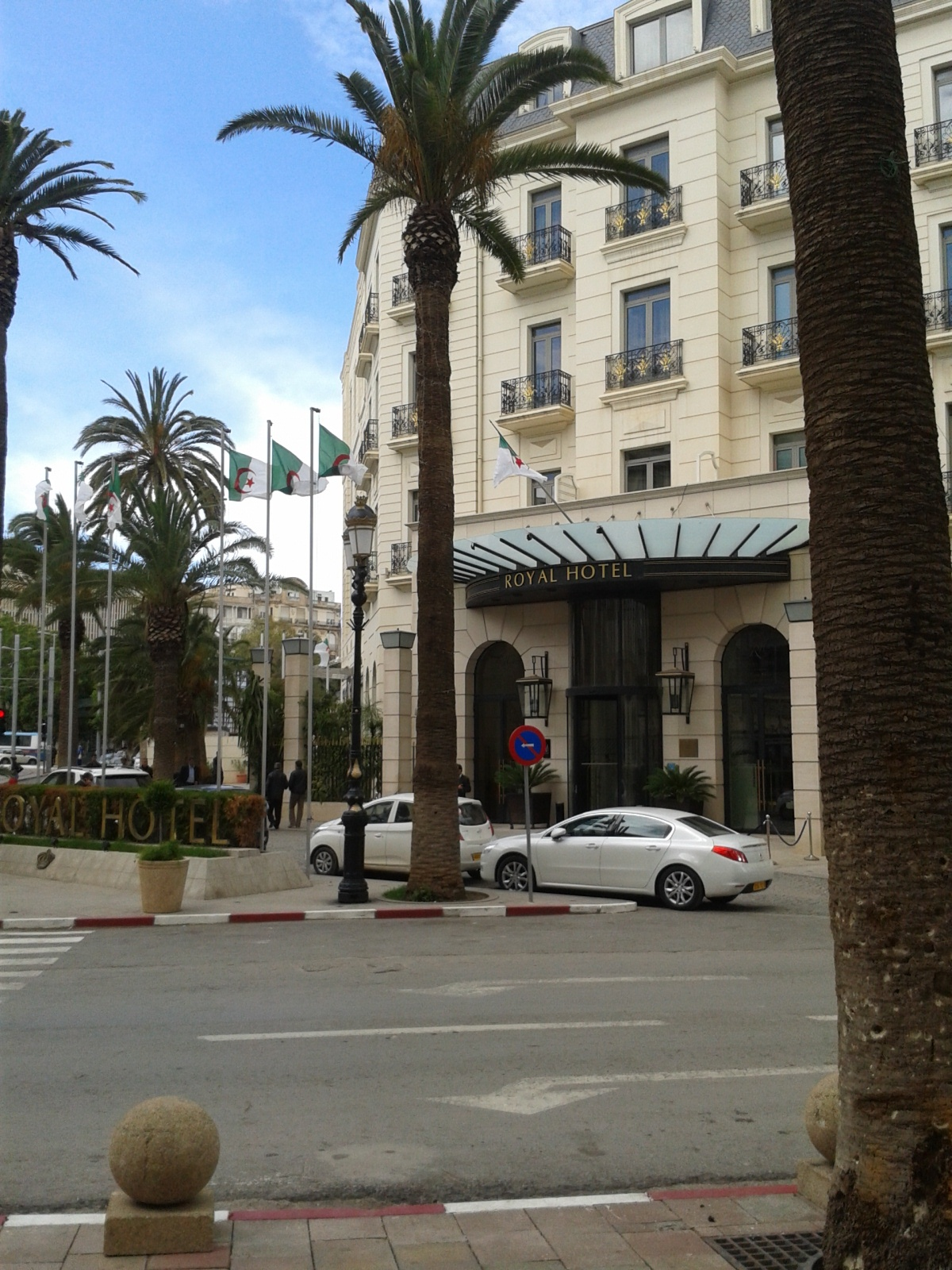
- Interactive map of the Royal Hotel area

General information
- Location: Oran, Algeria

Other information
- Number of rooms: 112
- Number of suites: 17

Website
- http://www.royalhoteloran.com/

Royal Hotel is a luxury hotel in Oran, Algeria. One of the most luxurious hotels in Oran, it is set in a colonial building dated to 1920 and contains 112 rooms, 12 junior suites and 5 senior suites. The hotel is currently operated by Accor as part of its MGallery Hotel Collection.
