= Nicolás Mihanovich =

Argentine businessman

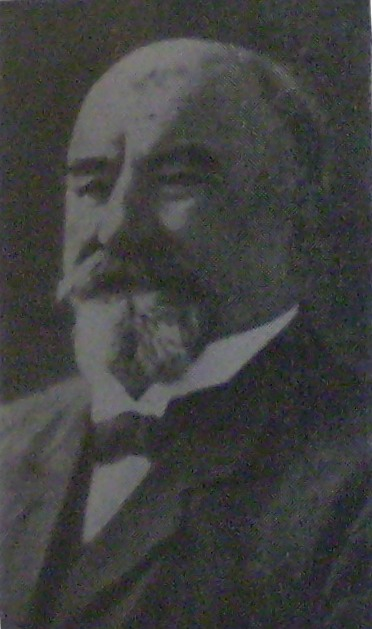
Nicolás Mihanovich

Nicolás Mihanovich (1846–1929) was a Croatian Argentine businessman closely linked to the development of the Argentine merchant marine.

== Life and times ==
=== The Beginnings ===
Niccolò Mihanovich was born in the Kingdom of Dalmatia, Austrian Empire, in what is today Croatia, in 1846. Self-educated, he arrived in Buenos Aires in 1868 and formed a partnership with two of his countrymen: Gerónimo Zuanich and Octavio Cosulich. Operating five steam ships by 1879, the group initiated scheduled transports from Buenos Aires to the then-remote outposts of Bahía Blanca and Carmen de Patagones. The new route's success led to the purchase of the 1,500-ton Watergeus, which received a materials transport contract from the rapidly expanding Buenos Aires Great Southern Railway, and to the 1887 establishment of the first ferry service between Buenos Aires and Colonia del Sacramento (Uruguay).

Already the majority stakeholder in Nicolás Mihanovich y Compañía, he bought out his partners in 1888. Facing increasing competition in the late 1880s, the Mihanovich Company's strong financial base put it in a position of great advantage following the ruinous Panic of 1890, which began in Argentina when the overissuance of local bonds by the Barings Bank led to their collapse in value. The first major steam ship operator to fold was La Platense, whose assets of over 1.2 million gold pesos (a similar amount in US$) Mihanovich was able to purchase in 1894 for only 92,000.

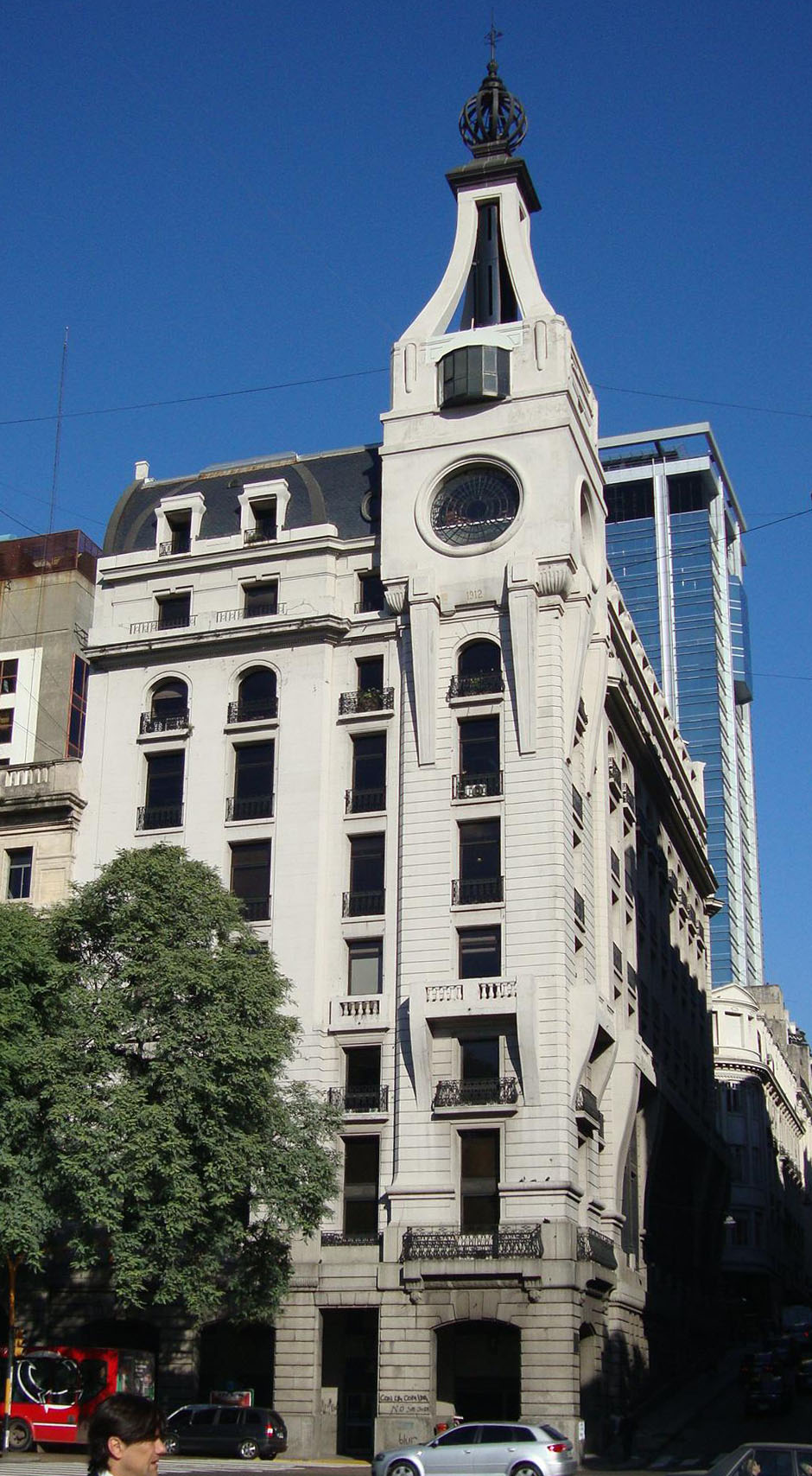
ex-Nicolás Mihanovich Navigation Company

=== The king of Argentine shipping ===
An ongoing rivalry with Saturnino Ribes' Las Mensajerías (so named for its prominence in the mail transport business) led to a trust arrangement between the two, whereby Mihanovich ceded control of Uruguay River shipping to Ribes, who was given control of the Paraná. Ribes' death in 1897, however, left Las Mensajerías in the hands of heirs opposed to the previous arrangement, though the Mihanovich Company's strength forced the Ribes heirs to sell the company. Purchasing Las Mensajerías for 450,000 gold pesos, and smaller rivals Giuliani and Balparado as well, the massive Sociedad Anónima Nicolás Mihanovich was incorporated in 1898; by then, the group operated over 200 steamers.

Mihanovich would operate not only Latin America's largest shipping company, but also the region's premier shipyard, allowing the group to dispense with the outsourcing of repairs. The company began to issue stock and by 1907, the company's market capitalization reached 7 million gold pesos (Mihanovich's brother, Miguel, sons (Pedro y Nicolás) and other relatives remained majority stakeholders). British investors then quickly brought its capitalization to £2.1 million (US$10 million), leading to the company's registration in London as the Argentina Navigation Company - Nicolás Mihanovich Ltd. in 1909; the group, by then, had become a local monopoly of 350 steamers.

Freed of competition in waterborne shipping, the group increasingly lost business in his riverboat unit to the nation's fast-growing railways. Enjoying the advantages of speed and inland access, the Entre Ríos Railway became enough of an obstacle to prompt Mihanovich to negotiate personally with the line's British owners (though with little success). Mihanovich then diversified into other sectors. He also purchased an extensive quebracho forest to take part in the growing furniture market, a wheat mill, the Banco de Italia (over half of the 6 million immigrants in Argentina were from that nation), and an abattoir, among others.

Mihanovich also joined German developer Otto Wulff in the construction of what became known as the Otto Wulff building. Completed in 1914, the Montserrat neighborhood landmark housed the Embassy of the Austro-Hungarian Empire, by which Emperor Franz Joseph I named Mihanovich Honorary Consul and Edler in 1899. Later on the emperor granted him the title of Baron (Nikolaus Freiherr Mihanovich von Dolskidol) in 1912 with the right of transmission for his dedicated efforts towards the empire. He also received honours and decorations from others European monarchs, among them; the Cross of Second Order to Naval Merit and Alfonso XIII's Order from Alfonso XIII of Spain and The Order of Saint Stanislaus with stars from Czar Nicholas II of Russia.

The company, however, remained closest to the British Empire, and although the Mihanovich family owned a 70% share, the company was registered in London. Every new steamer was, moreover, purchased from England's famed shipbuilders, including the 6,177-ton freighter Centenario (one of the largest at that time in the world).

During his active life, Mihanovich was involved in many charity activities and support various associations. He purchased 800 square kilometres of land in the Chaco where he founded a colony called Colonia Dalmacia. He and his brother Miguel create a foundation for the development of their home town Doli that still exists today called zaklada-mihanovic.

=== Twilight ===
Competition from the railways helped prompt Mihanovich to sell a number of his surplus freighters to European governments (newly embroiled in World War I). The perceived conflict of interest in having Mihanovich, an Austro-Hungarian citizen and official, direct a British-controlled shipping company led to his retirement from the board of directors, in 1916. His elder son, Pedro, briefly succeeded him, though in 1918, Mihanovich sold his family's stake in the group to a consortium led by a British shipping magnate, Owen Philipps, later Lord Kylsant, and an Argentine investor, Alberto Dodero.

Mihanovich's heir, Pedro, died in 1925 and ultimately, the patriarch outlived all his sons. Later in the decade, he had a 21-story, eclecticist apartment-office complex built in Buenos Aires' Retiro area. Inaugurated in 1929, the structure was named the Mihanovich building in honor of its developer, who had recently died at age 85. The ship NICOLAS MIHANOVICH was built in 1962.

== Ships ==
- Buenos Aires, 1924
- Ciudad de Buenos Aires 1914
- Ciudad de Montevideo
- Eolo, 1896
- Helios, 1923
- Luna
- Lambaré
- Paris 1910
- PS Bruselas, 1911
- Rivadavia, 1918 (Aguapey)
- San Martin
- Triton
- Tridente
- Venus
- Washington, 1906
