= Hilton Alger =

Hotel in Algiers, Algeria

Coordinates: 36.7383°N 3.1566°E

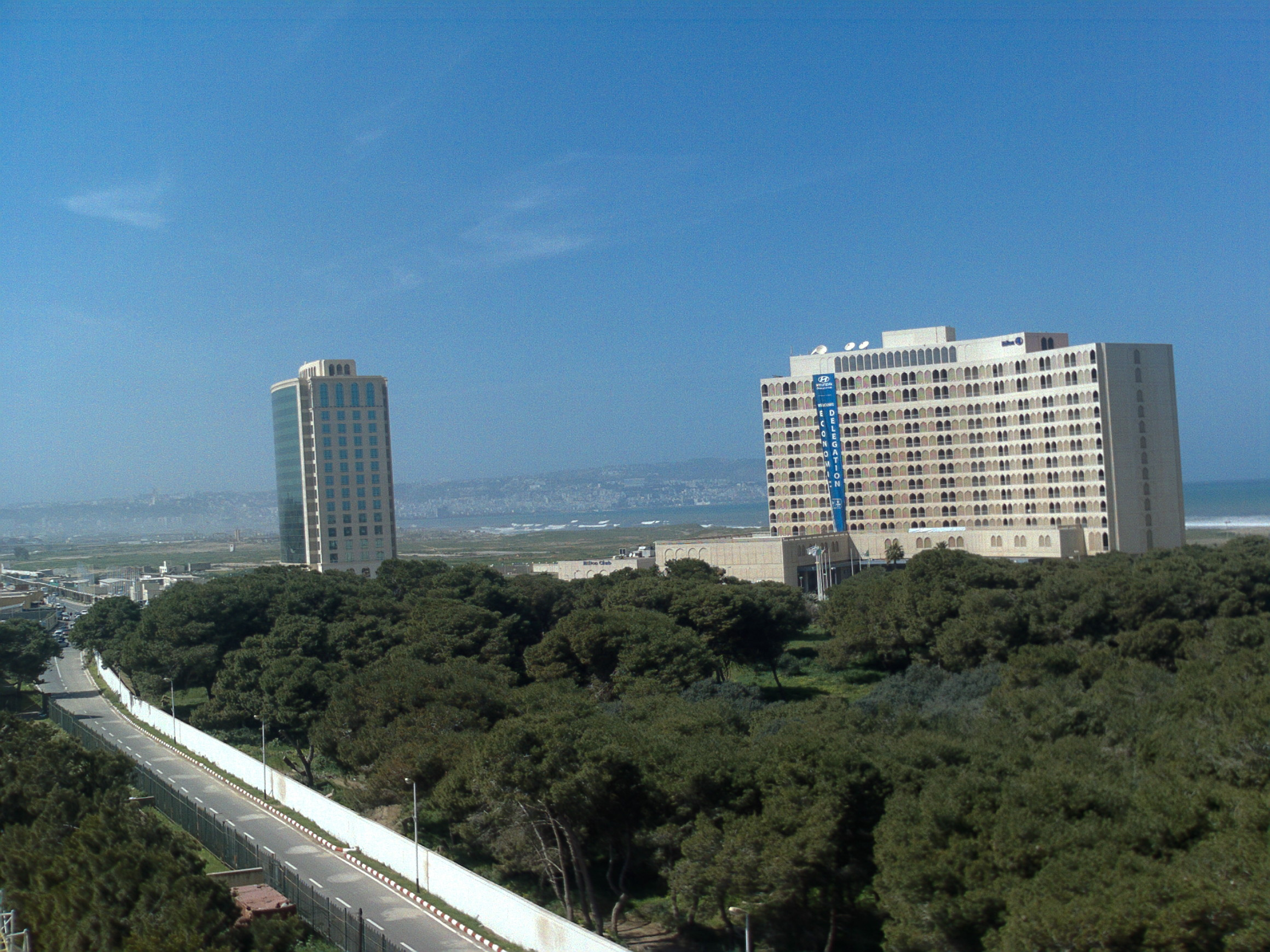
- Interactive map of the Hilton Alger area

General information
- Location: Algiers, Algeria
- Opening: 1993
- Closed: 2017
- Owner: DAHLI

Other information
- Number of rooms: 412
- Number of suites: 40

The Hilton Alger was a hotel in Algiers, Algeria operated by Hilton Hotels. It opened in 1993 and closed in 2017.

== History ==
The hôtel was built in the early 1990s as joint-venture between Daewoo and the state owned SAFEX. It opened in 1993 as a Hilton but it closed less than one year later, after the assassination of the Daewoo representative in Algeria. It reopened in 1997 as Hotel International d'Alger and become a Hilton again in 2000. It closed in 2017.

== Facilities ==
The hotel contained 412 rooms, including 40 deluxe suites. The Sara restaurant served Mediterranean cuisine, while the Casbah served traditional Algerian cuisine and Tamina served Mediterranean and international cuisine. The hotel also had numerous bars and lounges.
