= Hotel Ritsa =

Hotel in Sokhumi, Abkhazia, Georgia

- Location within Georgia

General information
- Location: Sokhumi, Abkhazia, Georgia
- Coordinates: 42°59′58″N 41°1′28″E

Hotel Ritsa is a hotel in Sukhumi, Abkhazia, Georgia. The luxury hotel is located on the seacoast, along the Sukhumi quay, near the historical center and is decorated with bas-reliefs. It was damaged during the War in Abkhazia in the early 1990s and restored in the 2000s. It contains two restaurants; "San Remo" which serves European cuisine and "Aktafurta" which serves Abkhaz cuisine.
