= Hotel Abkhazia Sukhumi =

Hotel in Sukhumi in Soviet times

- Location within Georgia

General information
- Location: Sukhumi, Abkhazia/Georgia
- Coordinates: 42°59′54″N 41°1′25″E

Hotel Abkhazia was a hotel in Sukhumi in Soviet times. It was built in 1930s and worked until it burned down in 1985. The hotel was one of the city's most prominent hotels. The lot with the remains of the hotel and other buildings was bought in 2008 by an investor who undertook to restore the hotel. As of 2018 it is still not operational.
