= Grand Hotel Cirta =

Hotel in Constantine, Algeria

- Location within Algeria

General information
- Location: Constantine, Algeria
- Coordinates: 36°21′39″N 6°36′48″E

Other information
- Number of rooms: 76

Grand Hotel Cirta or Hotel Cirta is a hotel in Constantine, Algeria, located in a white colonial building at 1 Avenue Rahmani Achour, on the edge of Place des Martyrs. The hotel is the property of the Societe de l'Hotel Cirta, owned by Mohand Tiar, an Algerian businessman and philanthropist.

== Architecture ==
The hotel has 76 rooms, including 30 double rooms, 33 single rooms, 1 triple room and 4 suites and 1 apartment room. Lonely Planet describes it as a "grand old hotel" and "another remnant of the colonial era". In 1935 one publication described the hotel as being "as fine a hotel as anyone would care to stop at, excepting that we do not have a private bath". Another said in 1972, "The grandeur of its mosque-like domed lobby, with its light blue tiles and hanging brass lanterns, may be fading somewhat in these post-colonial days of the Peoples' Democratic Republic of Algeria." The hotel contains a cinema.
