= Pierre-Yves Rochon =

French interior designer (born 1946)

- Born: 1946 (age 79–80)
- Occupation: Interior designer
- Spouse: Annick Rochon
- Children: 1 son

Pierre-Yves Rochon (born 1946) is a French interior designer. He has designed luxury hotels and restaurants around the world.

== Early life ==
Pierre-Yves Rochon was born in 1946. He grew up in Brittany.

== Career ==
Rochon first worked for designer Michel Boyer.

Rochon started his own business in 1979. He has designed luxury hotels like the Four Seasons Hotel George V and the Shangri-La Hotel in Paris, the Savoy Hotel and the Four Seasons Hotel London at Park Lane in London, the Amstel Hotel in Amsterdam, and the Disneyland Hotel in Marne-la-Vallée near Paris, and the Waldorf Astoria Beverly Hills in Beverly Hills, California.

== Personal life ==
Rochon has a wife, Annick, and a son. They reside in Paris.
