= Hotel Villavicencio =

Hotel in Argentina

Coordinates: 32°31′36″S 69°01′05″W

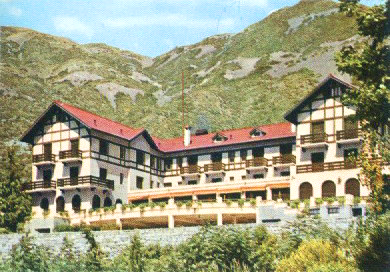
Hotel Villavicencio

The Hotel Villavicencio is a historic resort hotel northwest of Mendoza, Argentina which opened in 1940 and closed in 1979.

== Overview ==
Built in 1940 near thermal springs of the same name, the Hotel Villavicencio is east of Aconcagua (the highest point in the western hemisphere) and lies approximately 1,750 meters (5,740 feet) above sea level, in the Andes mountain range. National economic instability helped lead to the hotel's closure in 1979, though the provincial government of Mendoza continued to maintain the property.

The National Natural Resources Bureau declared 70,000 ha (180,000 ac) surrounding the hotel a protected nature preserve in 2001 and in 2006, the property was purchased by the Paris-based Danone Group. The conglomerate contracted local developer Álvarez Argüelles to restore and modernize the hotel with the intention of reopening it as a four star hotel. Works announced at the time encountered numerous delays, however, and have not yet taken place as of 2020.

Charles Darwin stayed here on March 30, 1835 during his world tour.
