= Ata Bozaci =

Swiss graphic designer

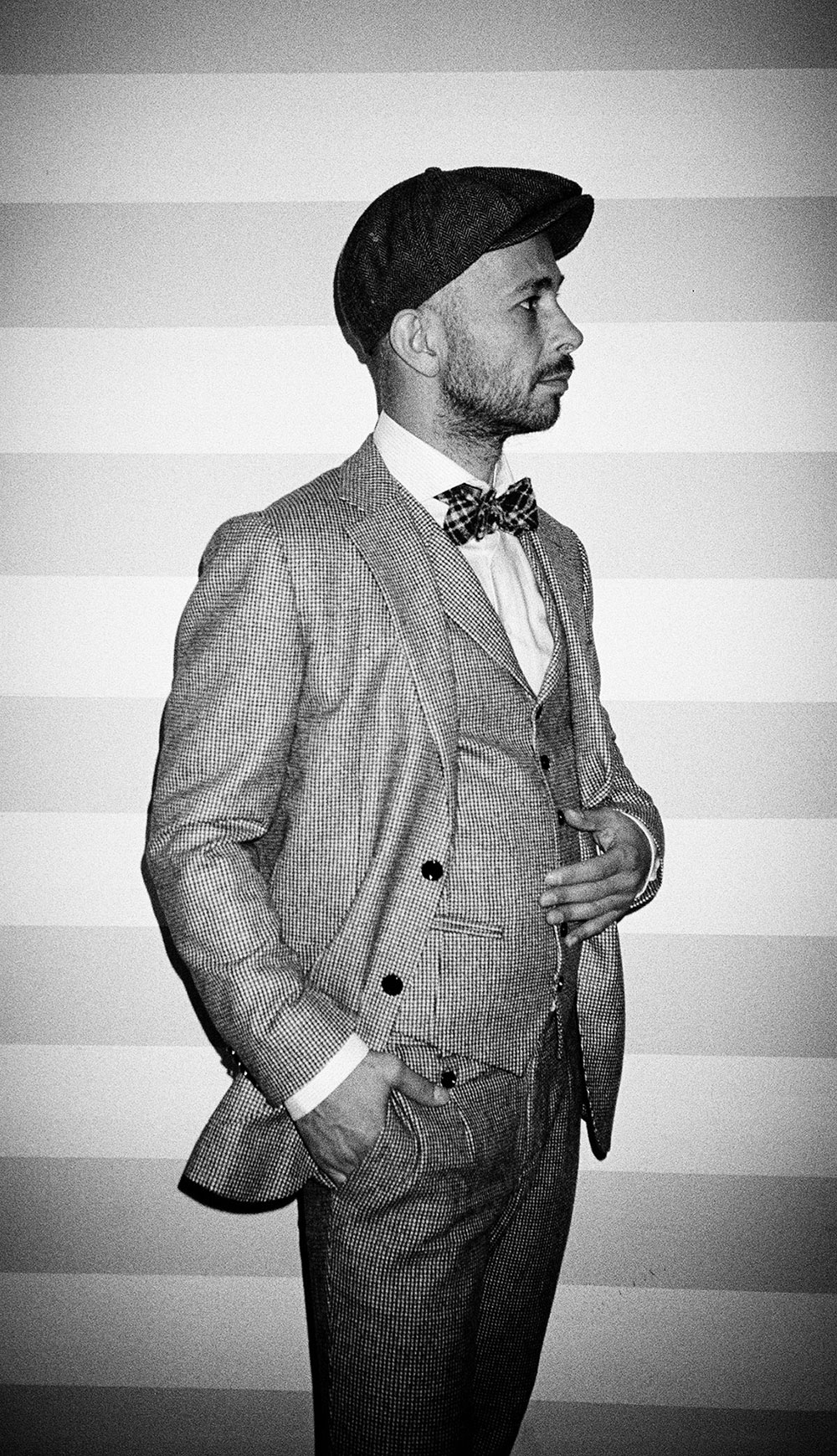
Ata Bozaci, 2017

Ata Bozaci (born March 3, 1974, in Burgdorf) is a Swiss graphic designer, illustrator and artist. His work encompasses drawing, painting, digital graphics, large-scale wallpainting and modular sculpture. From 1990 to 2012 his principle creative output was graffiti writing; he is known for graffiti works under the pseudonym Toast. People – man – are central to his recent digital works.

== Life and work ==
Bozaci grew up in a working-class Turkish family. His drawing talent was already recognised in primary school. From 1990 to 1991 he undertook a foundation course at an art and design school. From 1992 to 1996 he studied in the graphics department at the Schule für Gestaltung (Design School), Bern. For his graduation work he made the first-ever sprayed comic. His desire to connect graffiti with graphics almost cost him his place studying. In 1992 he was invited to take part in a group exhibition with H. R. Giger at Art Frankfurt. In 1995 he designed the artwork for hip-hop band Fettes Brot’s album ‘Auf einem Auge blöd’. Further graphic commissions followed within the Bernese club and cultural scene, including a collaboration with the cult magazine SODA.

Bozaci graduated from his graphic design course when he was 22 and started working freelance in Bern. He produced 15 skateboard designs for Intersport in collaboration with the graphic design studio Büro Destruct.

While Bozaci was an intern at Springer & Jacoby in Hamburg, he developed a close friendship with Mirko Reisser DAIM / getting-up. In 2001 they and other artists realised a 2000 m^{2} graffiti installation opposite Hamburger Harbour wharf, on the exterior wall of the Blohm + Voss shipyard at Dock 10, entitled ‘Das neue Hamburg und seine Partnerstädte’ (The New Hamburg and its Twin Cities).

In 2007 Bozaci was awarded his own colour by spray-paint producer Molotow, called ‘TOAST signal black’.

=== Artistic career ===
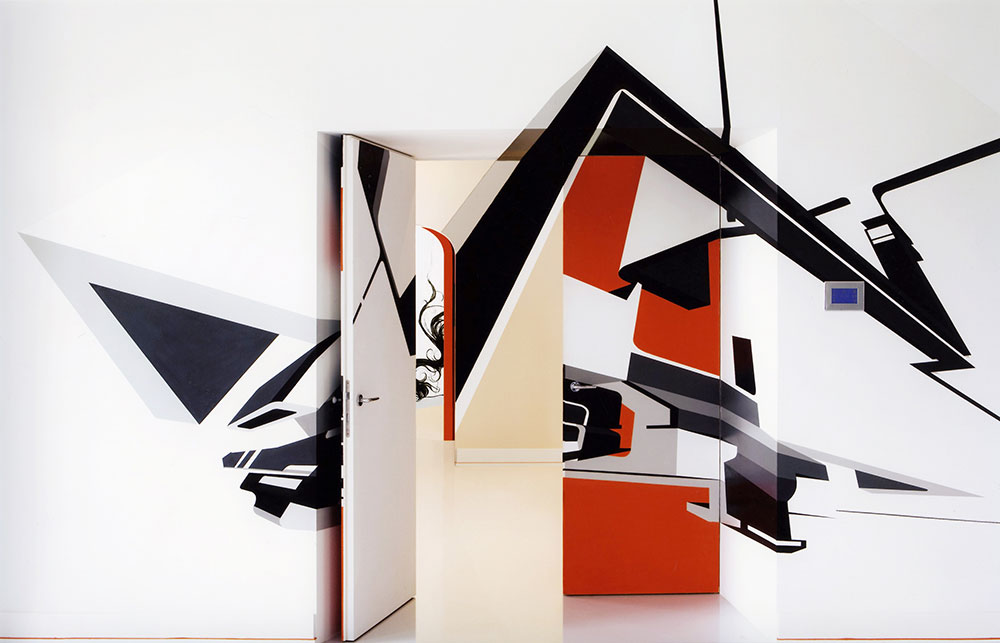
Point of view, apartment in Schloss Velden, 2007

In the late 1990s Bozaci established the company Atalier Visual Entertainment with business partners Remy Burger and Patric Geissbühler, concentrating on online game commissions. They became the most successful firm in their sector, with Die Mobiliar, Swiss Dairy Producers and the Swiss Post among their clients. In 2004 Atalier won Bronze in the Swiss Dialogue Marketing Prize. By 2007 Bozaci left Atalier in order to work purely as an artist.

The art collector Gunter Sachs invited Bozaci, alongside Basel graffiti writer Dare, to design his apartment at the Schlosshotel Velden. Linked by the title ‘Point of View’, the artists painted six immersive pictures which merge into one complete image from just a few points of view. The work was illustrated in full in the Architectural Digest (AD) magazine. For the special exhibition ‘Die Kunst ist weiblich’ about Gunter Sachs’ life and work at the Museum der bildenden Künste (Fine Art Museum) in Leipzig, Bozaci realised a large-scale picture on steel. Bozaci's collaboration with the Galerie Springmann from Freiburg began in 2008. Group exhibitions followed with Dare, Stefan Strumbel and the street art pioneer Blek le Rat. Two works from Gunter Sachs’ collection, ‘Satan in Heaven ’and ‘Black devil’ sold well above their estimates at Sotheby's auction house in London in 2012. In 2014 two further Bozaci works were auctioned at Karl&Faber in Munich.

=== Private life ===
From early on Bozaci travelled widely in Europe. Thanks to his contact with the US street artist Dave Pursue, he was able to work with the skateboard company Osiris in San Diego. He criss-crossed Mexico with the rock band ‘disidente’. Two months in Cuba and numerous inspirational trips to Australia, China, Thailand, Malaysia and Singapore followed.

Bozaci lives in Zurich with his wife and daughter.

== Works ==
=== Graffiti ===
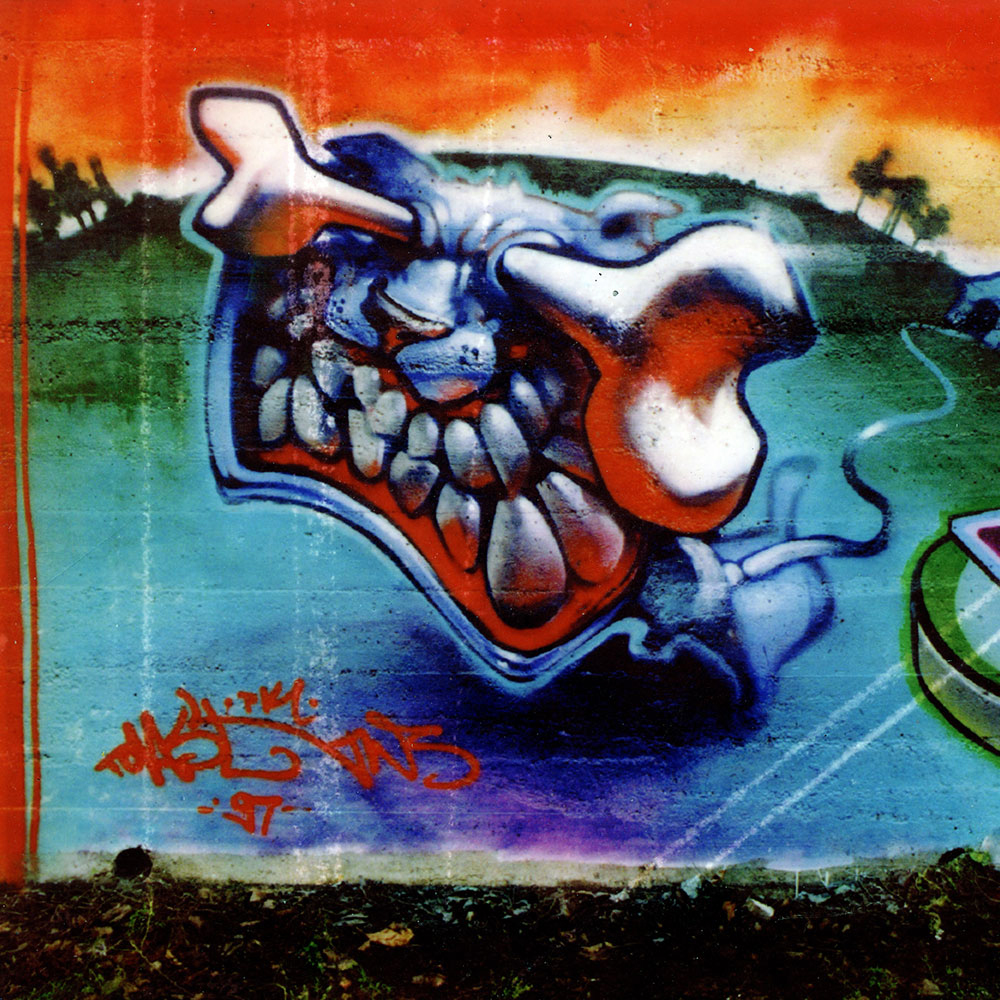
Bonedog, 1997

The works Bozaci produced between 1990 and 1996 under the alias Toast were marked by cartoonish figures. Although he began spraying lettering, for a long time Bozaci was recognised as one of the most important graffiti figure sprayers. His signature approach was to make marks that do not reveal how they were made using the simplest means.

=== Letter Architecture ===
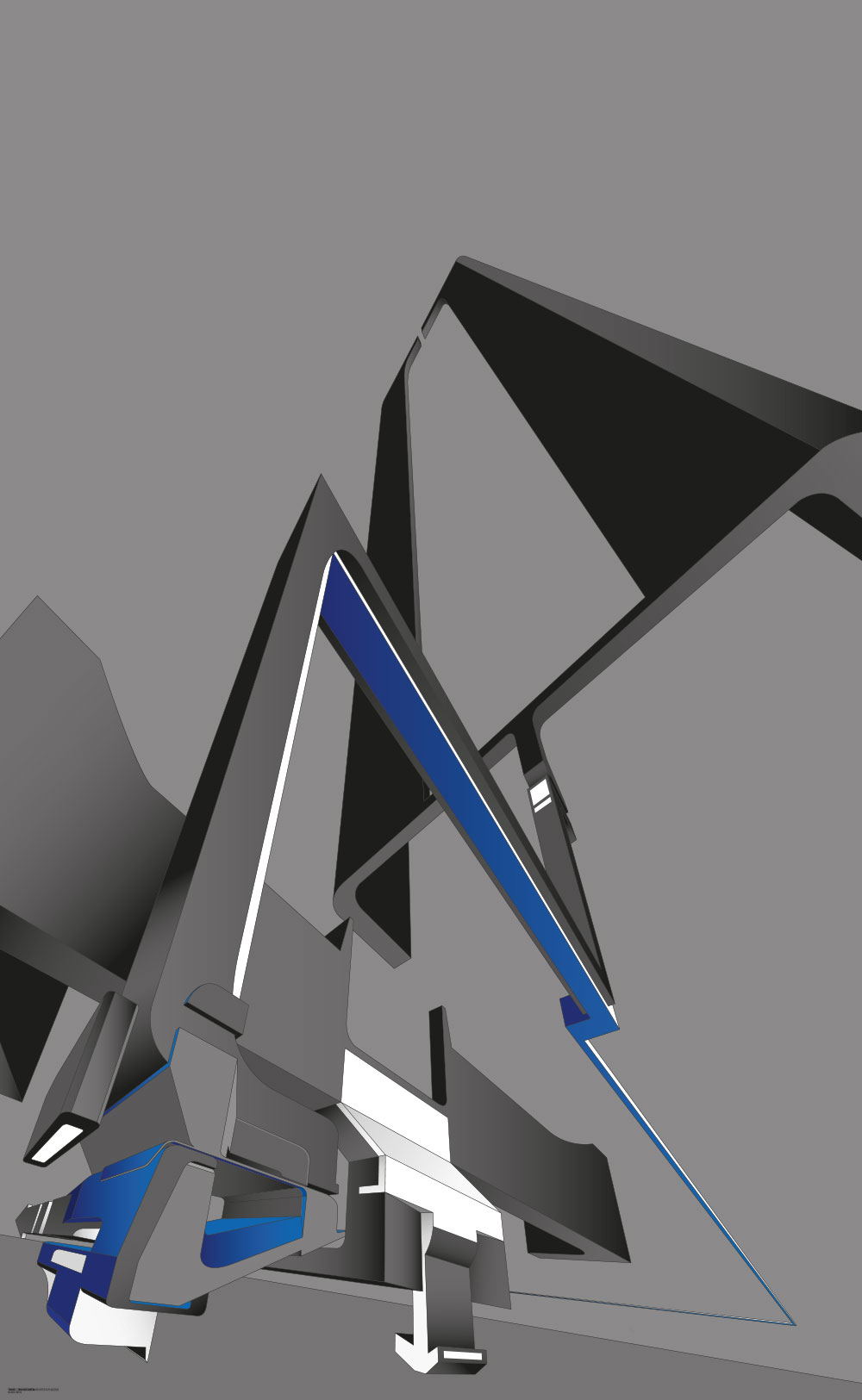
Black devil, 2003

The ‘Letter Architecture’ series was ongoing from 1996 to 2008. These works were characterised by the use of heightened perspective, resulting in immersive works in which the letters merge with their architecture.

=== Modular sculptures ===
Bozaci adapted a characteristic property of graffiti writing – the intuitive inscription of letters in a space. Various basic forms, such as a rectangle, triangle and circle, became the building blocks of his sculptural writing. These are large, multi-part figures that could equally be models for futuristic buildings. ‘For me graffiti and architecture are closely linked. For that reason, a move into tangible objects is logical.’ In 2011 ‘MLS Modular Letter System’ made from modular sculptural elements was shown at ‘The First Beijing International Design Triennial’ in the National Museum of China.

=== Hype Balloon ===
In 2011 Bozaci designed a large inflatable sculpture. The word HYPE is repeatedly blown up, only to collapse in on itself again. During the Grafik 12 exhibition Bozaci orchestrated a performance using the balloon: disguised as a graffiti sprayer he sprayed his own work and was ultimately taken away by police.

=== Linear and digital portraits ===
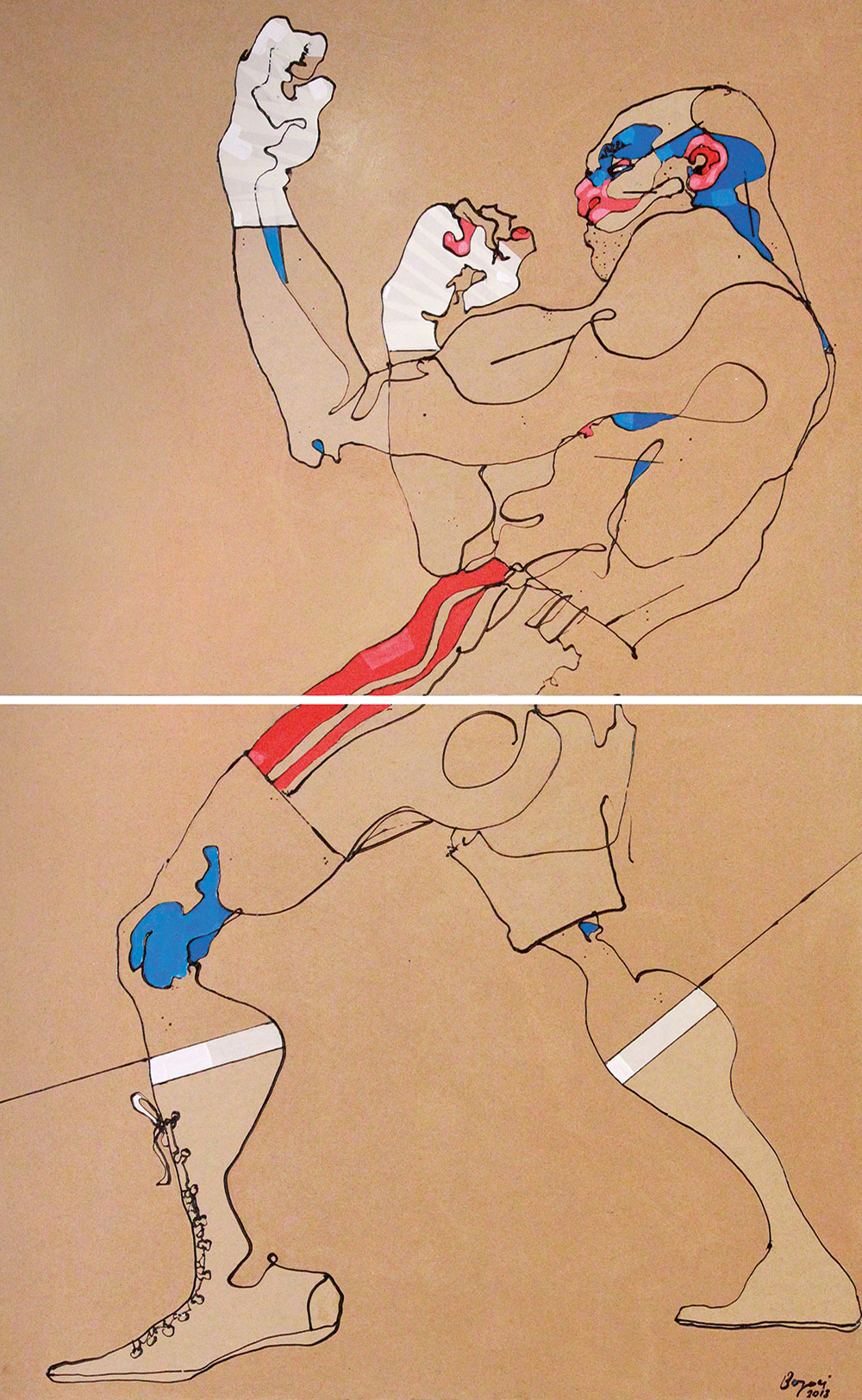
Der Boxer, 2013

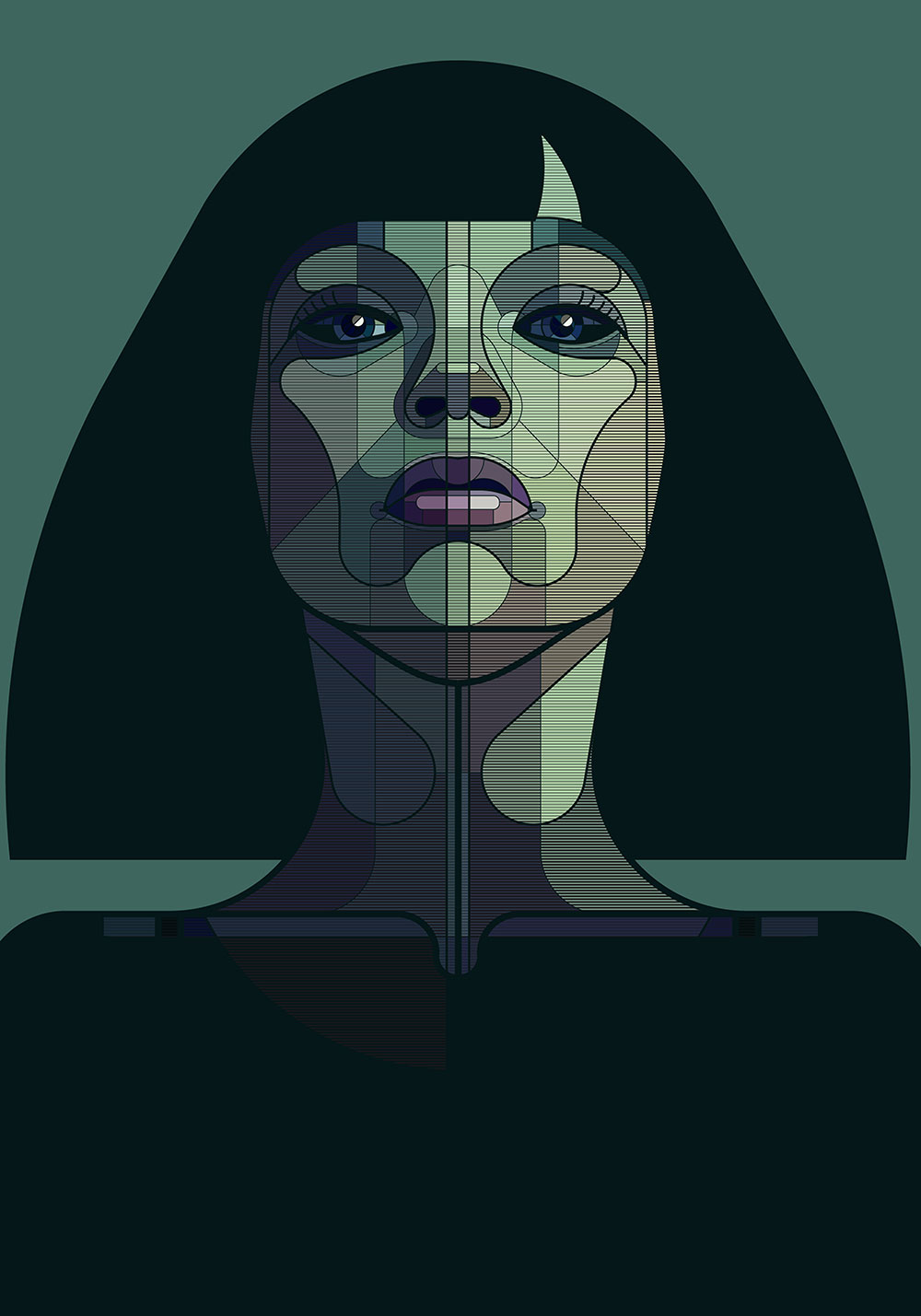
Mila, 2017

Bozaci took up boxing in the early 2000s. From this experience emerged the solo exhibition ‘Lineares Boxen’ at The Trace Gallery in Zurich in 2013.

From this period onwards Bozaci's works have become more socio-critical. His attitude to social media was visible in the 2015 travelling exhibition ‘Fifteen Seconds of Fame’. He transformed acquaintances’ facebook profile images into iconic portraits using digital technology. The faces are based on circle shapes. Bozaci views the perfection of a circle as emblematic of the current desire for beauty, with Facebook being the ideal place to manifest vanity and narcissism. Viewed from close up, only graphic forms can be comprehended in the portraits. Seen from a greater distance, a nearly photorealistic image emerges. Bozaci also subsequently painted digitally-created portraits as murals, among them a portrait of the Turkish writer Enis Batur. The five-metre tall picture was realised in collaboration with RAWCUT Design Studio and students from the Bomonti Mimar Sinan University in Istanbul.

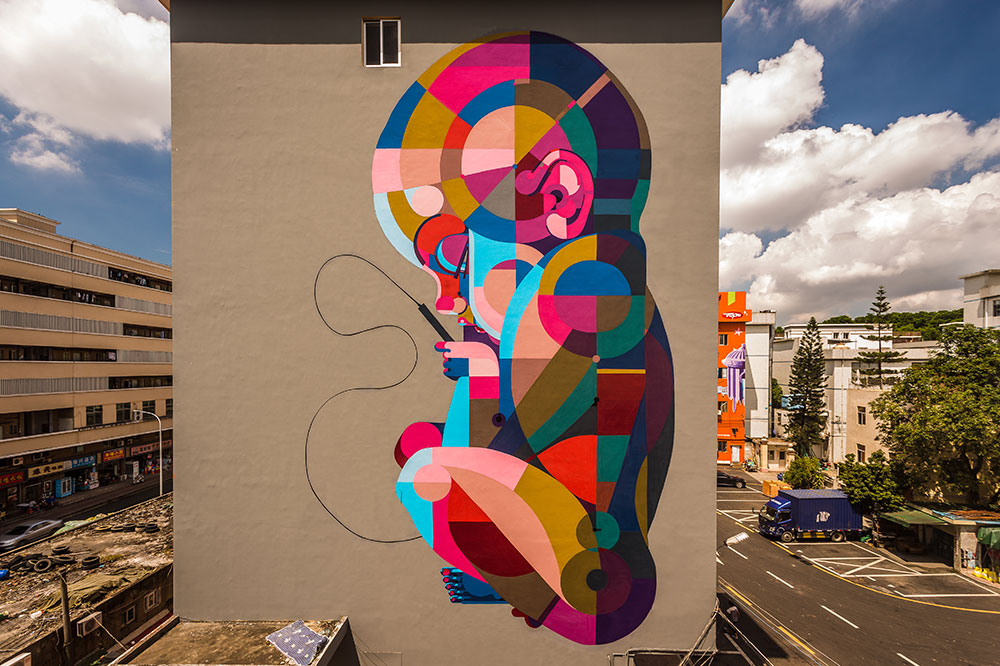
Online, Jardin Orange Shenzhen, 2016

Bozaci's largest mural to date can be seen in Shenzhen, China. He was invited to create an open-air gallery in 2016 to enhance a neighbourhood. The 27-metre tall work shows a brightly coloured baby attached to a smartphone.

Working with Microsoft in 2017 he created a design proposal for the Swissmill-Tower in Zurich. The work ‘Nackt-Schwimmen’ (Skinny Dipping) illustrates a mother-child relationship. Both the silo building itself and the design created controversy.

== Artworks (selection) ==
- 2017: Digidog alias Stromtrooper, BernARTiner, Bern
- 2016: Online, Wallpainting, Jardin Orange, Shenzhen, China
- 2014: Amanda, Wallpainting, STAMP Festival, Hamburg
- 2014: David, Wallpainting, Naestved, Denmark
- 2014: Michele, Wallpainting, Marrakech, Morocco
- 2013: Enis Batur, Wallpainting, Bomonti Mimar Sinan University, Istanbul, Turkey
- 2010: Wallpainting, Dafen Art Museum, Shenzhen, China
- 2008: Interior design, Maendler Modehaus, Munich
- 2007: Interior design, Schlosshotel Velden, Austria
- 2007: Interior design, Kamper, Graz, Austria
- 2005: Wallpainting, Bundesgartenschau, Munich
- 2000: Interior design, Kerquelen Shoe Store, West Broadway, New York, USA
- 2000: Das neue Hamburg und seine Partnerstädte, Wallpainting, Blohm + Voss, Hamburg
- 1997: Multimediawall, Wallpainting, Sprinkenhof GmbH, Hamburg

Album cover, video clips

- 2015: Ata Bozaci, Fifteen Seconds of Fame
- 2011: disidente, Antorcha
- 2006: Wurzel 5, Für di
- 2001: Karibik Frank, Staatsfeind Nr. 1
- 1995: Fettes Brot, Auf einem Auge blöd
- 1994: Grand Mother's Funck, Grand Mother's Funck

== Exhibitions ==
=== Solo exhibitions (selection) ===
- 2020: 4478 m ü. m., punkt 58, Strasserthun, Zurich, Switzerland
- 2015: Fifteen Seconds of Fame, The Trace Gallery, Zurich, Switzerland
- 2015: Fifteen seconds of Fame, Artstübli, Basel, Switzerland
- 2013: Lineares Boxen, The Trace Gallery, Zurich, Switzerland
- 2011: Unexpected Playground, Retrospektive, The Essential Collection, Zurich, Switzerland
- 2006: Toast, ArtCorner28, Biel, Switzerland
- 2004: Toast, Büro Discount, Zurich, Switzerland

=== Performances ===
- 2016: Crash test dummies, Volvo Art Session, Zurich, Switzerland
- 2015: Speed of the city, together with Pius Portmann and Harun Dogan, Volvo Art Session, Zurich, Switzerland
- 2012: Don't believe the hype, Grafik 12, Zurich, Switzerland

== Bibliography ==
- ADC Jahrbuch 2004, Werd Verlag, ISBN 3-85932-464-0
- Black Ink / Illustrations by Ata „Toast“ Bozaci, Publikat Verlag, ISBN 978-3-939566-06-9
- Büro Destruct, Die Gestalten Verlag, ISBN 3-931126-24-2
- Fadings, Publikat Verlag, ISBN 978-3-9809909-0-5
- Fifteen Seconds of Fame, Ata Bozaci
- Graffiti Art / Deutschland, Schwarzkopf & Schwarzkopf, ISBN 3-89602-144-3
- Graffiti Art / Süddeutschland und Schweiz, Schwarzkopf & Schwarzkopf, ISBN 3-89602-036-6
- Idea 285, nippan ips co., ltd, ISSN 0019-1299
- Pictoplasma, Die Gestalten Verlag, ISBN 3-931126-58-7
- Style Magazin 2001, style&thefamilytunes, ISSUE N°034
- Swiss Grafik Design, Die Gestalten Verlag, ISBN 3-931126-36-6
- Urban Discipline 2002 Graffiti-Art, getting-up, ISBN 3-00-009421-0
