= Woozy =

Woozy may refer to:

- Woozy (Oz), a fictional creature in the children's novel The Patchwork Girl of Oz
- Woozy Winks, the sidekick of fictional superhero Plastic Man
- "Woozy", a track by Faithless used in the soundtrack to The Beach
- Woozy (artist), a Greek street artist
- Woozy, a rock band from New Orleans

== See also ==
- Woozi, South Korean singer and record producer
- Wu Zi Mu, a character in the video game Grand Theft Auto: San Andreas
- Woosie, nickname of golfer Ian Woosnam
