= Héctor Esrawe =

Mexican architect

Héctor Esrawe (born 1968, Mexico City) is a Mexican industrial designer and architect. He is the founder of Esrawe Studio, a multidisciplinary design practice based in Mexico City. His work spans furniture, interior design, architecture, public installations, and museography.

== Education and early career ==
Esrawe studied industrial design at the Universidad Iberoamericana (UIA) in Mexico City, graduating in 1992. From 1997 to 2001 he was a design professor at UIA. He subsequently became design director at CENTRO Study House, where he created the Industrial Design degree programme. In 2003 he founded Esrawe Studio in Mexico City.

== Esrawe Studio ==
Esrawe Studio works across furniture, interior design, architecture, and public space installations. The studio's first residential building, Casa Sierra Fría in Mexico City, was completed in 2020. It consists of two parallel brick volumes arranged around a central courtyard, measuring 576 square metres.

The studio designed several locations of the Tori Tori restaurant in Mexico City, including a 2010 collaboration with Rojkind Arquitectos on the Polanco branch, and a 2020 Santa Fe branch featuring a cylindrical oak structure in a triple-height room.

== Other ventures ==
Esrawe co-founded EWE Studio in 2017 with Manuel Bañó and Age Salajõe, a collective focused on Mexican collectible design. He is also a co-founder of VISSIO and MASA, which promote Mexican collectible design, and a founding partner of the perfumery brand Xinú.

== Recognition ==
Esrawe Studio was named Interior Design Studio of the Year at the Dezeen Awards 2020. Esrawe was named one of Architectural Digest (AD) Germany's Top 100 Creatives in 2021. He received the World Special Prize for an Interior at the Prix Versailles in 2021. He was inducted into the Interior Design Hall of Fame in 2025. The American Institute of Architects recognised him as an Honorary Fellow.
