= Dieschitz =

Coordinates: 46°35′N 14°03′E

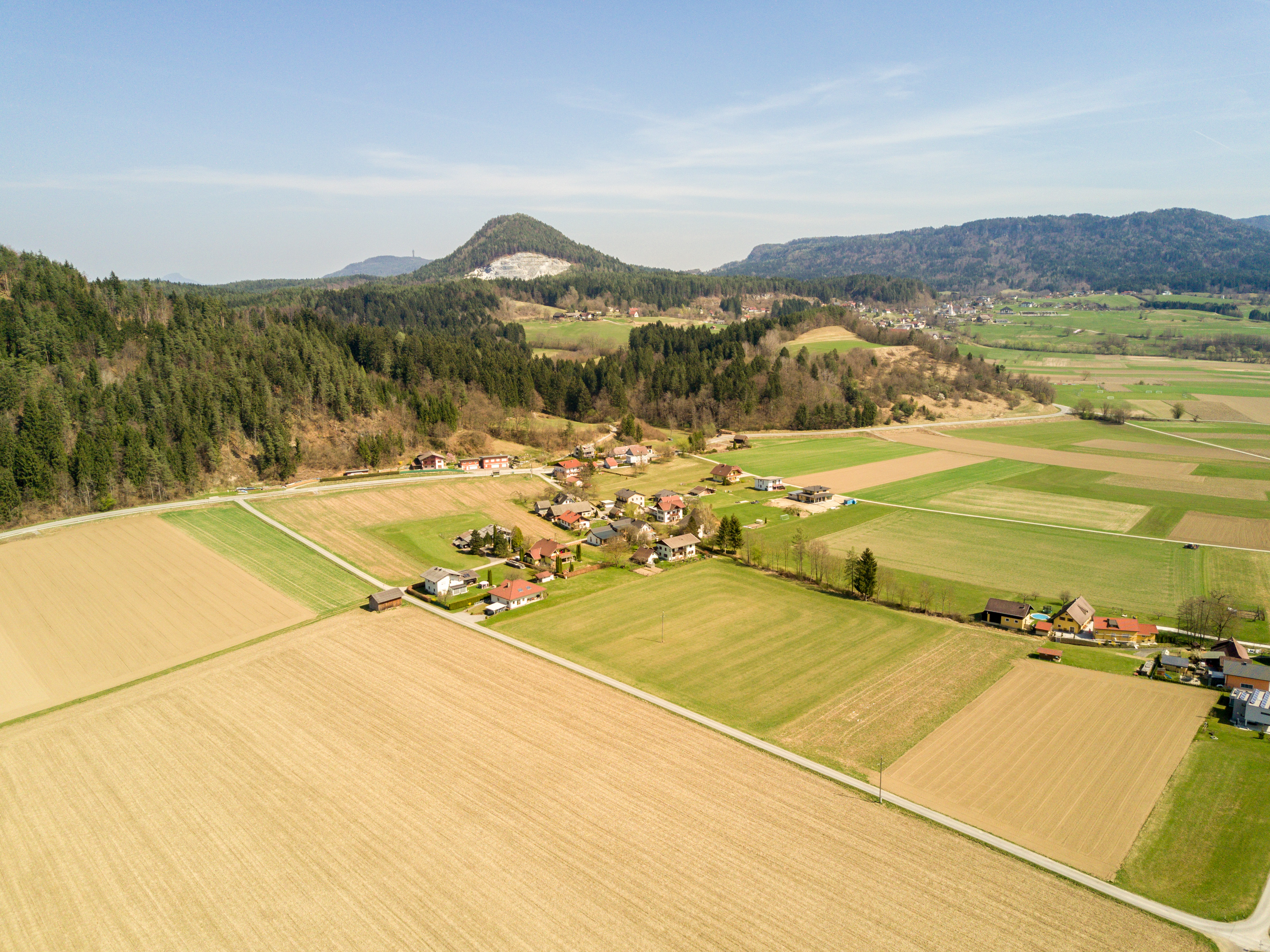
Aerial view of Dieschitz

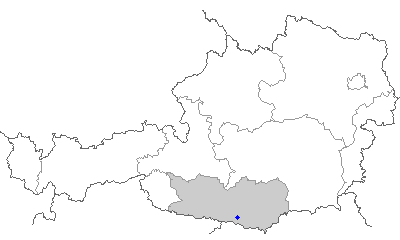
Dieschitz (Deščice), Austria

Dieschitz (Slovene Deščice [ˈdeːʃtʃitsɛ]) is an Austrian village in the municipality of Velden am Wörthersee, Villach, Carinthia.

== Geography ==
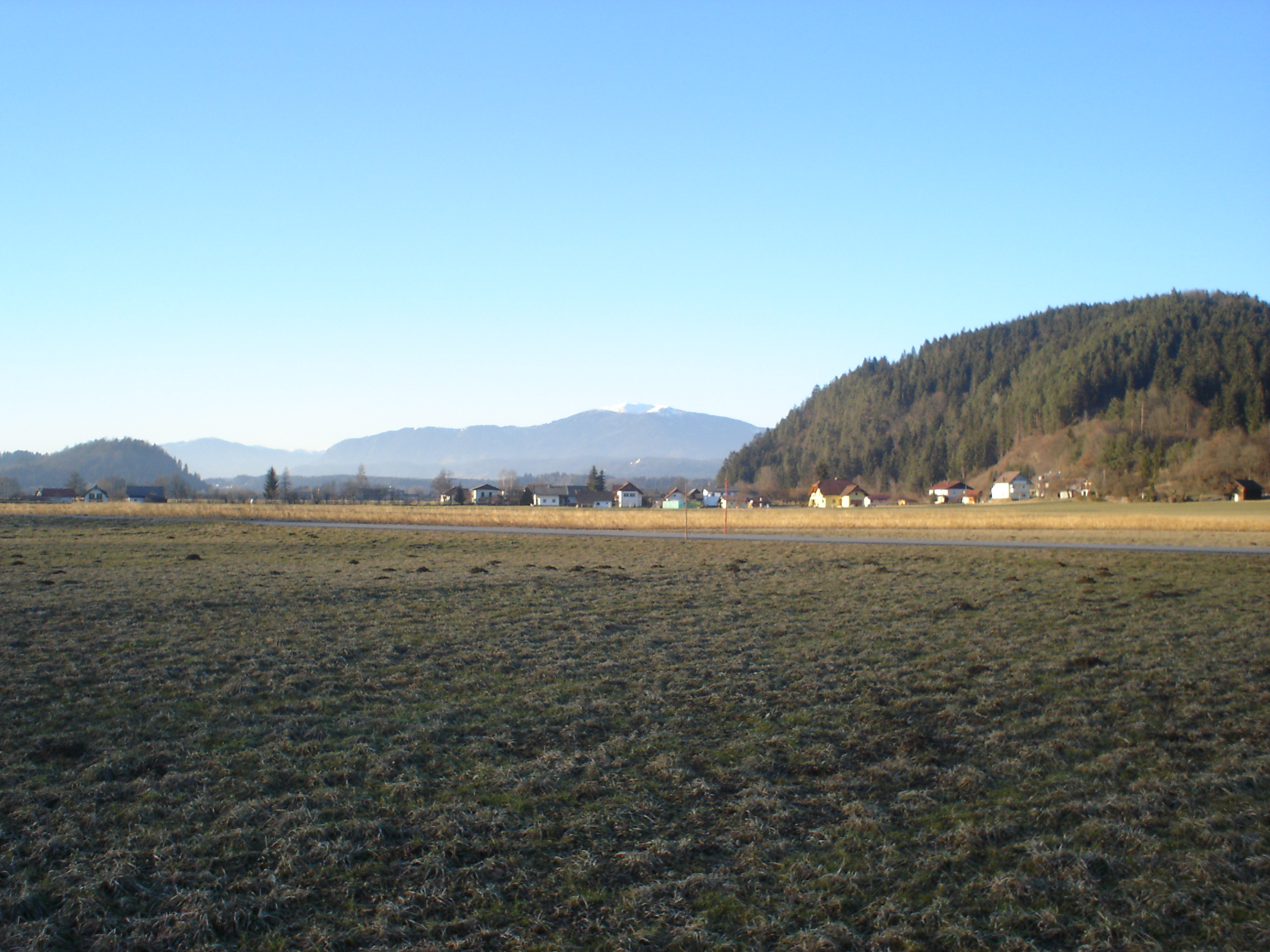
Oberdieschitz (Močile)

Dieschitz is located approximately 5 km (3 mi) south of Velden in the eastern part of the meander of Rosegg of the Drau River. Dieschitz has two parts: Unterdieschitz = Dieschitz in the strict sense and Oberdieschitz (Slovene: Močile).

== Population ==
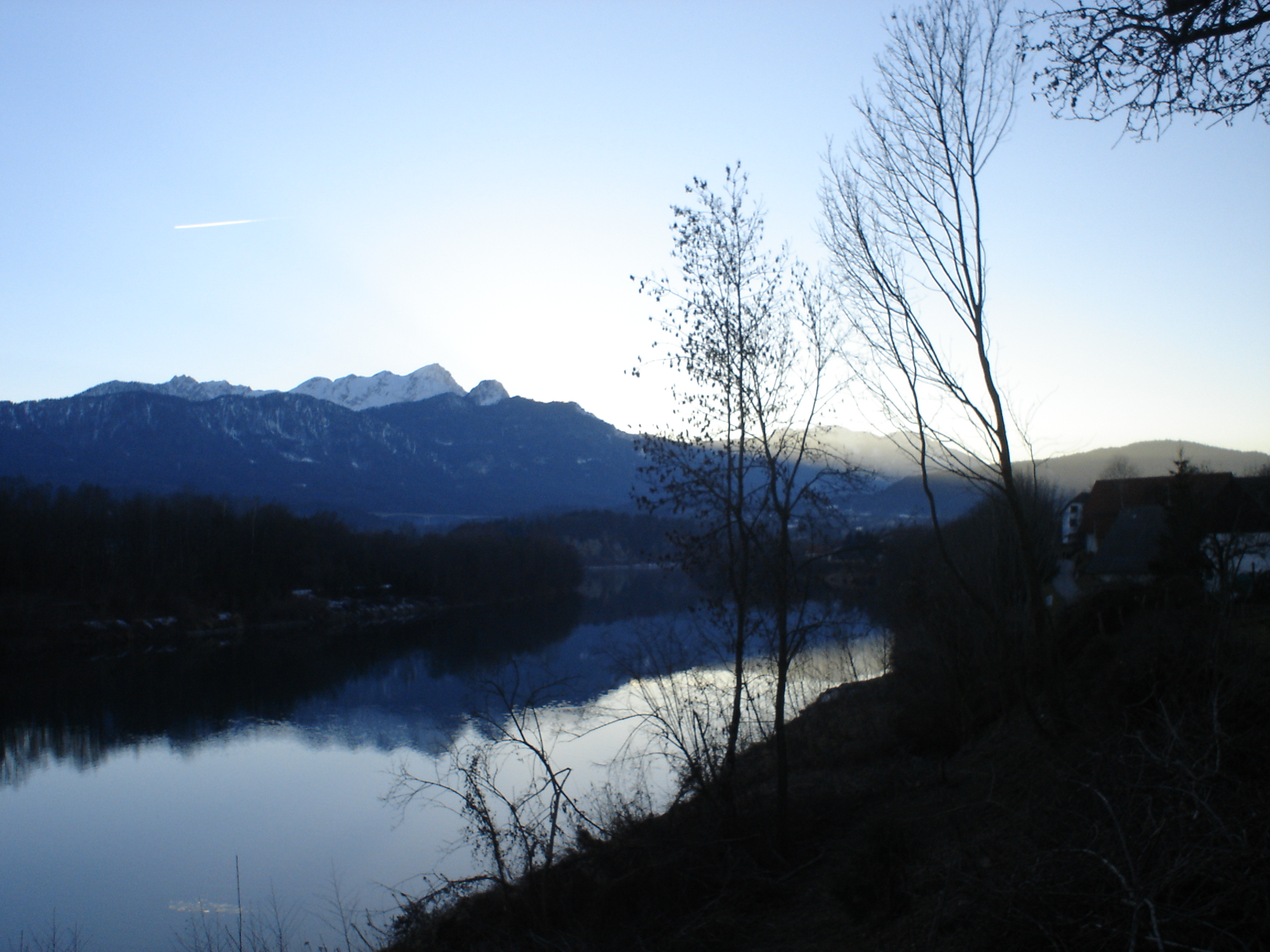
The Drau River in Dieschitz

According to the 2001 census, Dieschitz has a population of 122 inhabitants. Some of the inhabitants are (still) bilingual. Censuses of the spoken language gave the following numbers of Slovenian speakers (percentages fluctuate although there has been no notable migration):

1951: 79.0%
1961: 53.1%
1971: 39.3%
1981: 16.8%
1991: 26.2%
2001: 15.4%

== Economy ==
The village bar and the brick factory closed in the 1950s, the store in 1970, and the carpentry workshop in 1996. The inhabitants, in the past mostly farmers, have to travel for work to Villach or Klagenfurt, and a few have found work nearby in St. Egyden, Schiefling am See or Velden.

== Notable residents ==
- Primož Koschat, poet
