= Burgruine Hohenwart =

Castle ruins in Austria

Coordinates: 46°38′17″N 13°59′44″E

- Carinthia, Austria
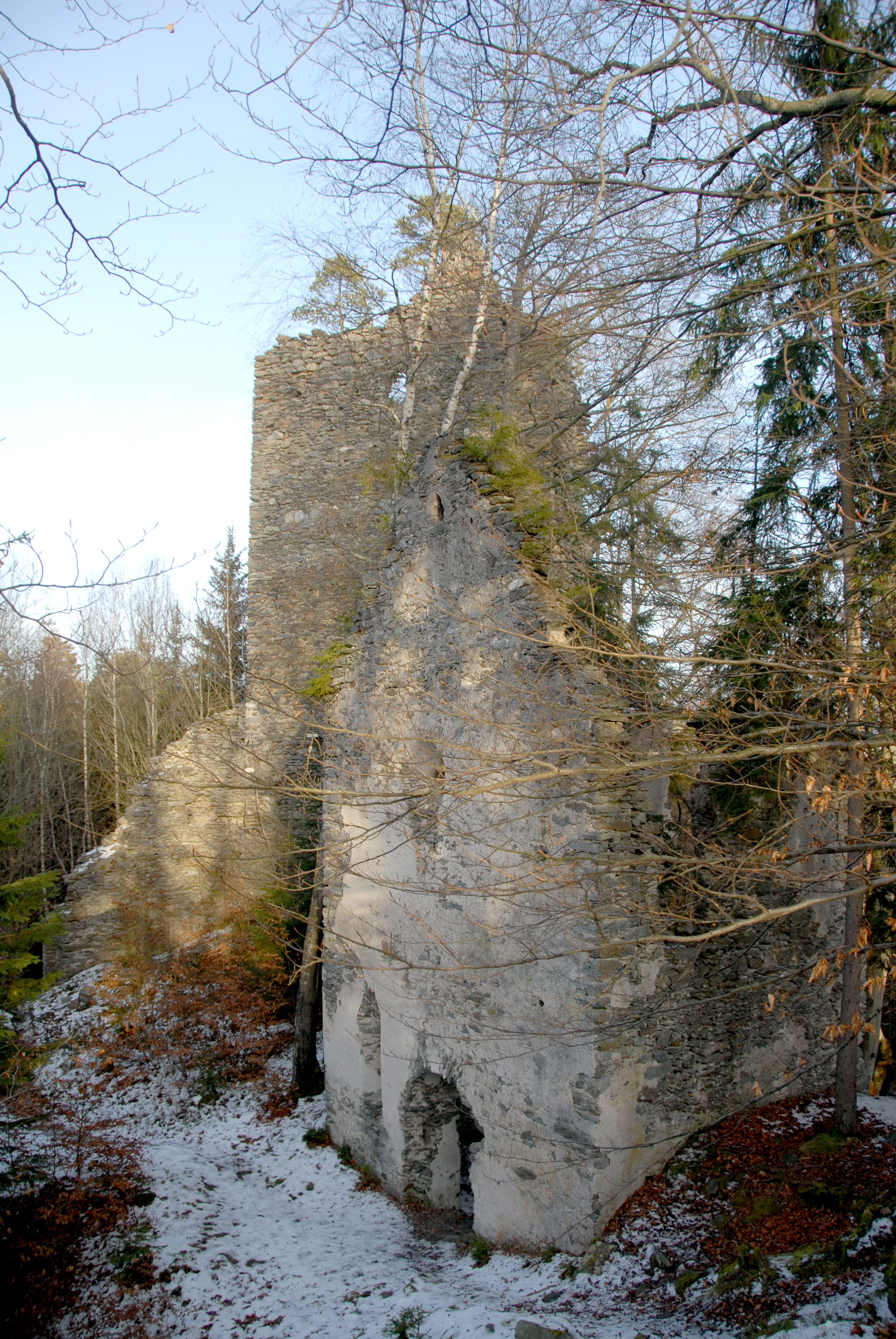
- Ruins of Burgruine Hohenwart in 2007

Site information
- Type: Hilltop castle

Site history
- Built: First half of the 12th century

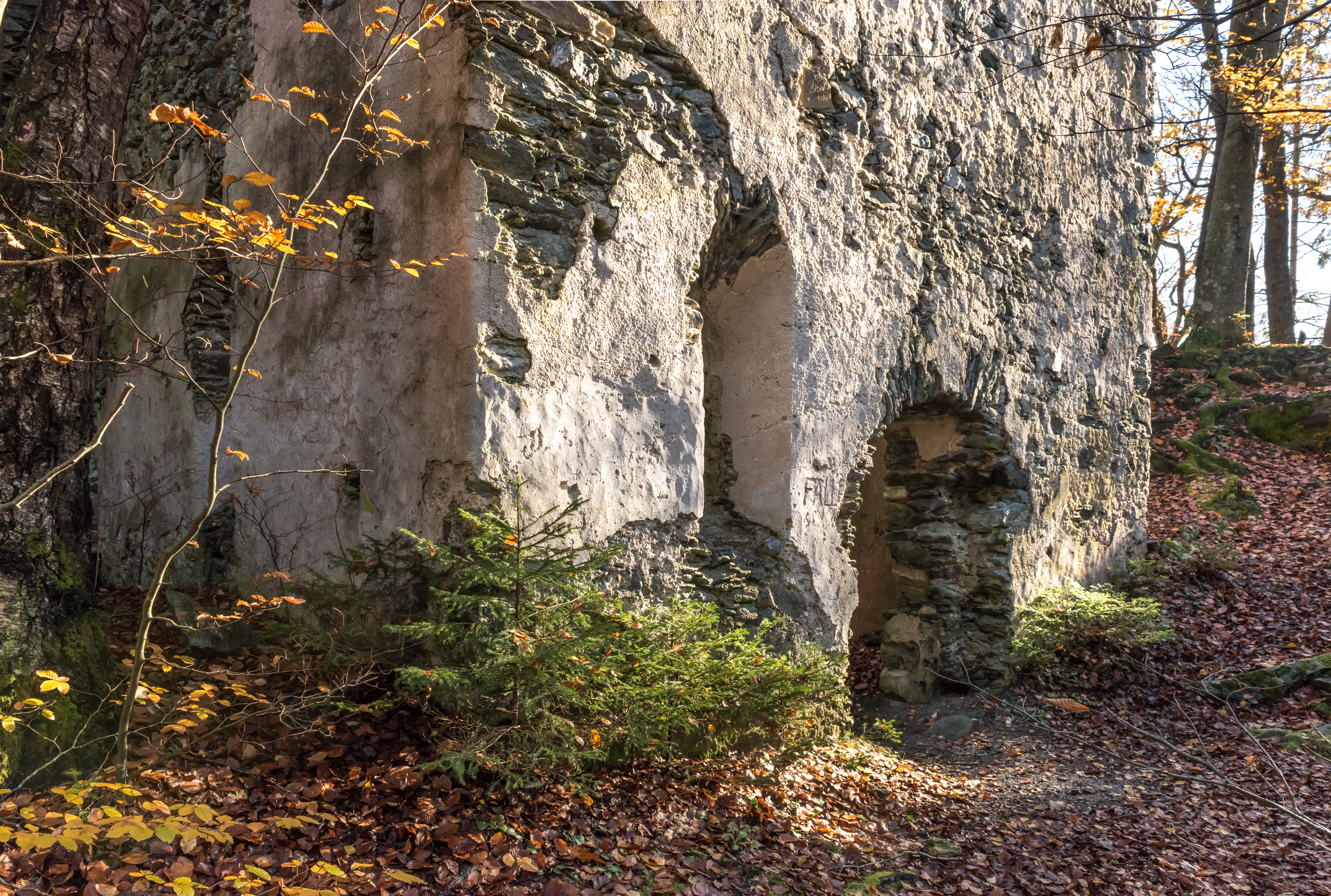
Western window and portal of the chapel in Burgruine Hohenwart in 2018

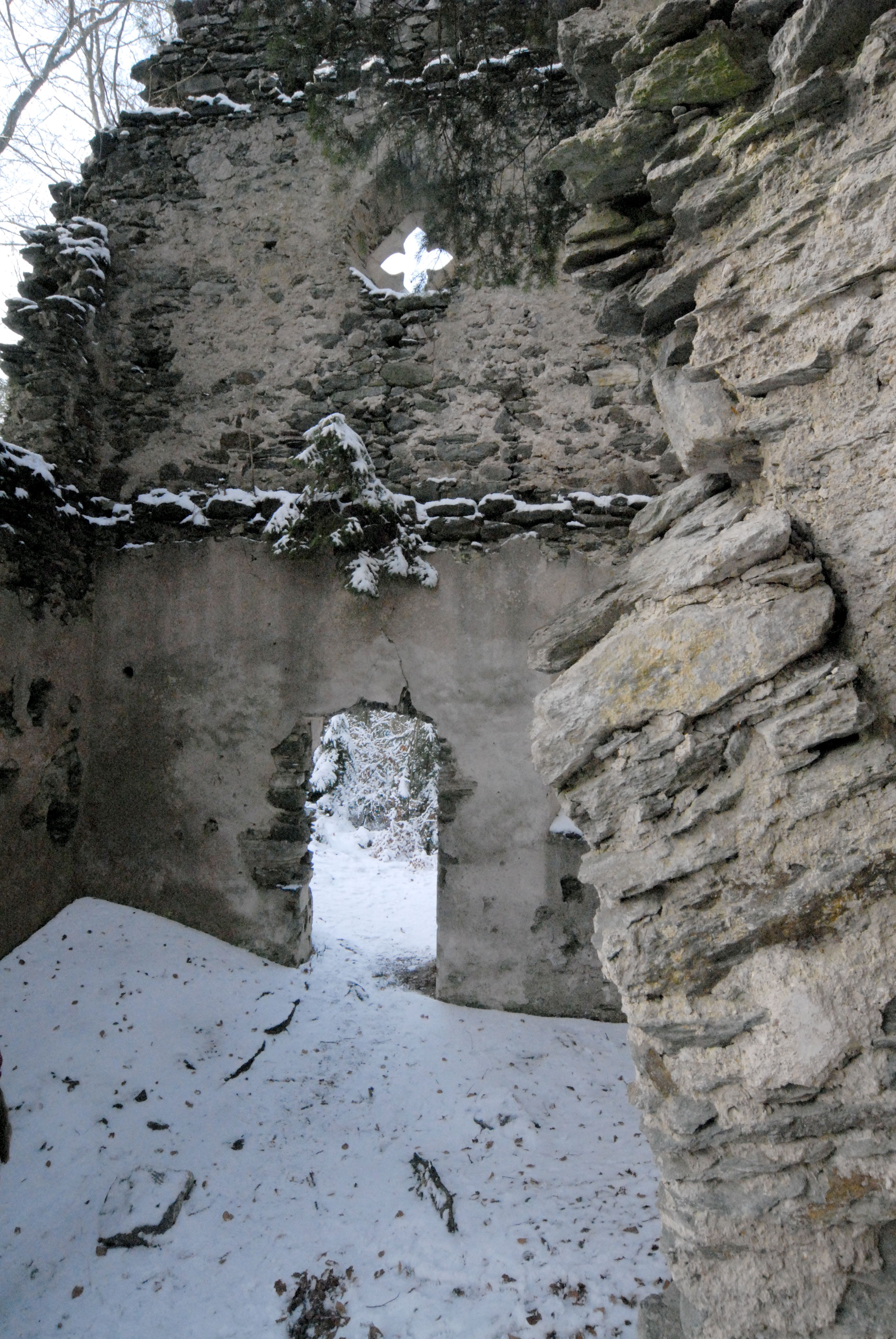
Window and doorway in Burgruine Hohenwart in 2006

Burgruine Hohenwart is a ruinous medieval castle south of the village of Köstenberg in Carinthia, Austria, first mentioned in 1144/1149 and probably built in the first half of the 12th century. It was probably ruinous by the early 16th century.

== See also ==
- List of castles in Austria
