= Velden am Wörther See =

Velden am Wörther See Vrba na Koroškem
- Municipality
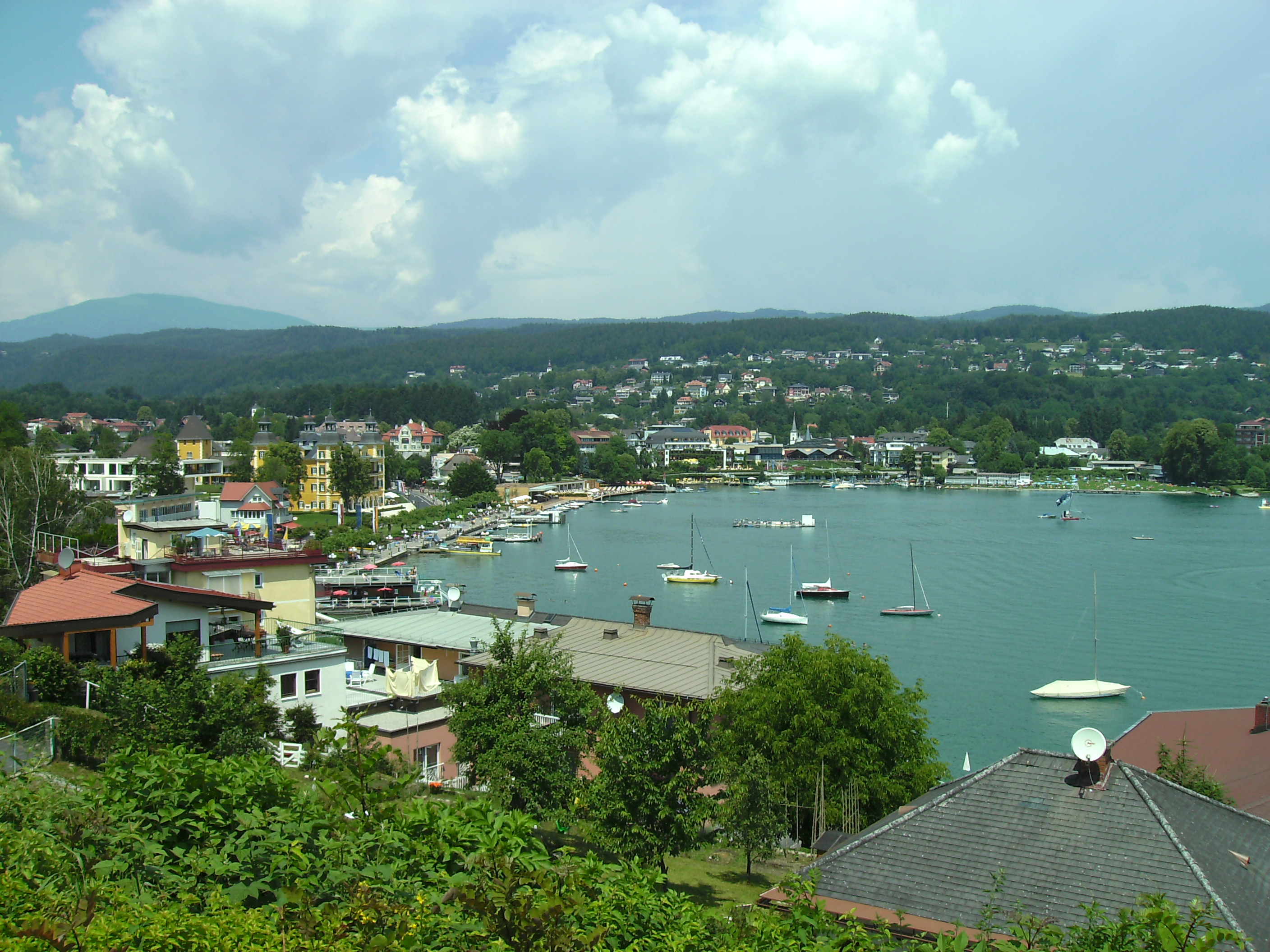
- Velden Bay

- Coat of arms

- Location within Austria
- Coordinates: 46°36′N 14°2′E
- Country: Austria
- State: Carinthia
- District: Villach-Land

Government
  - Mayor: Ferdinand Vouk (SPÖ)

Area
  - Total: 52.97 km^{2} (20.45 sq mi)
- Elevation: 460 m (1,510 ft)

Population (2016-01-01)
  - Total: 8,952
  - Density: 169.0/km^{2} (437.7/sq mi)
- Time zone: UTC+1 (CET)
  - Summer (DST): UTC+2 (CEST)
- Postal code: 9220
- Area code: 04274
- Website: www.velden.gv.at

Velden am Wörther See (Slovene: Vrba na Koroškem) is a market town in Villach-Land District, in the Austrian state of Carinthia. Situated on the western shore of the Wörthersee lake, it is one of the country's most popular holiday resorts.

== Geography ==
The municipal area of Velden is subdivided into eight Katastralgemeinden (cadastral communities): Augsdorf, Duel, Kerschdorf ob Velden, Köstenberg, Latschach an der Drau, Lind ob Velden, St. Egyden, and Velden am Wörther See – which include 30 villages:

- Aich (Dob)
- Augsdorf (Loga Vas)
- Bach (Potok)
- Dieschitz (Deščice)
- Dröschitz (Trešiče)
- Duel (Dole)
- Fahrendorf
- Göriach (Gorje)
- Kantnig (Konatiče)
- Kerschdorf (Črešnje)
- Köstenberg (Kostanje)
- Kranzlhofen (Dvor)
- Latschach (Loče)
- Lind ob Velden (Lipa)
- Oberdorf (Zgornja vas)
- Oberjeserz (Zgornje Jezerce)
- Oberwinklern (Vogliče)
- Pulpitsch (Polpače)
- Rajach (Sreje)
- Saisserach (Zajzare)
- St. Egyden (Šentilj)
- Selpritsch (Žoprače)
- Sonnental
- Sternberg (Šentjurij na Strmcu)
- Treffen (Trebinja)
- Unterjeserz (Spodnje Jezerce)
- Unterwinklern (Spodnje Vogliče)
- Velden am Wörther See (Vrba)
- Weinzierl (Vinare)
- Wurzen (Koren)

== History ==
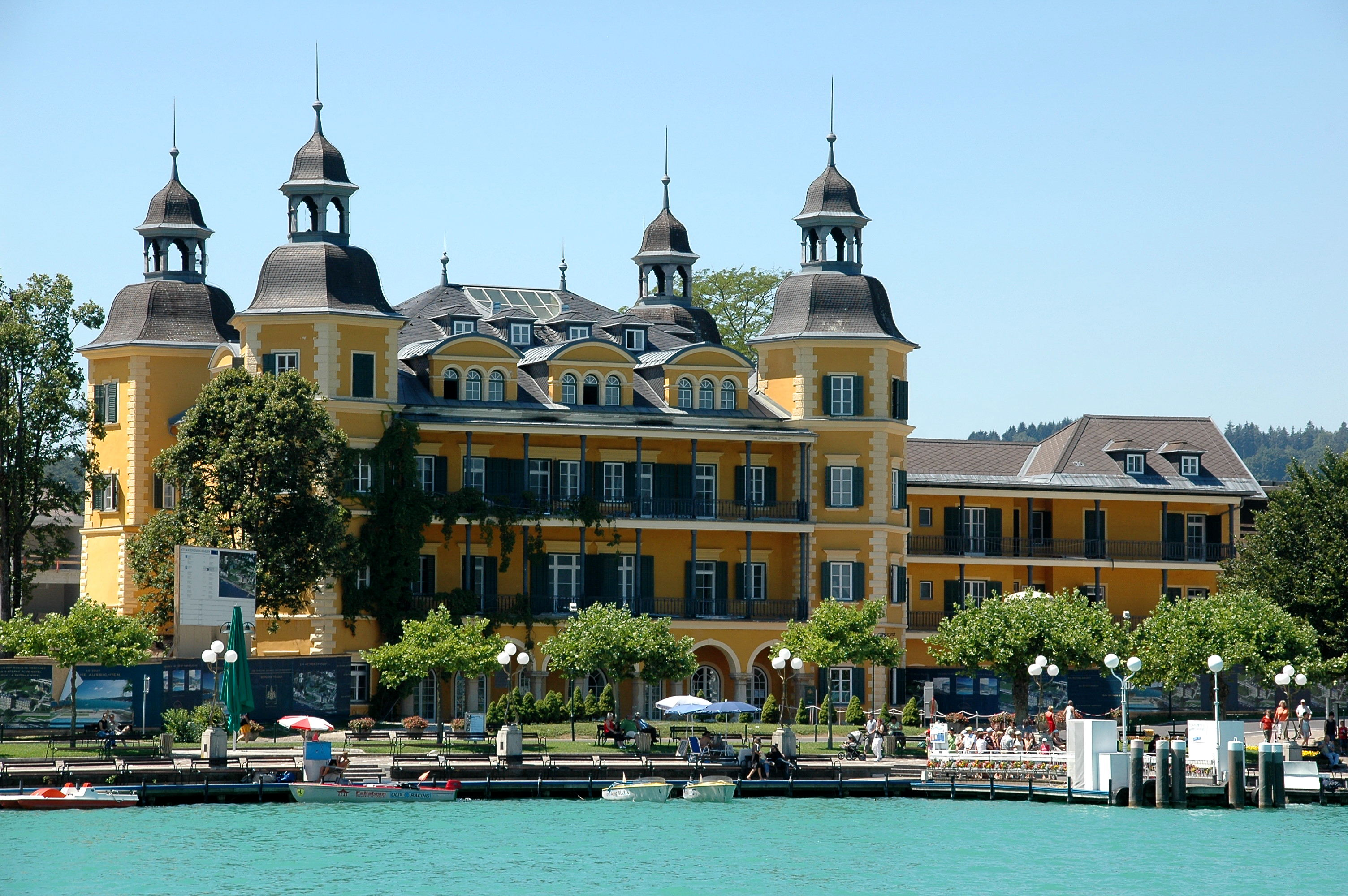
Schloss Velden

Originally a mansio on the Roman road between Villach (Sanctium) and Magdalensberg. It was first mentioned in a 1263 deed as Campus and in 1410 as Velben. In medieval times it belonged to the estates of the Burgruine Hohenwart, seat of the Counts of Celje, the Counts of Ortenburg, the Knightly Order of Saint George in Millstatt Abbey, and finally the Austrian House of Habsburg.

In 1545, the Protestant Khevenhüller noble family had acquired the lands of Landskron and Velden, where Bartlmä Khevenhüller from 1585 had a renaissance architecture manor house built. His descendants were expelled from the Habsburg lands in the course of the Counter-Reformation in 1639, and the castle then fell to the noble House of Dietrichstein. Decayed and demolished by a fire, it was rebuilt in 1892, as a hotel called Schloss Velden.

Later an estate of Gunter Sachs, it was the filming location for the popular 1990-1992 German-Austrian TV series Ein Schloß am Wörthersee starring Schlager singer Roy Black.

== Politics ==
The municipal council (Gemeinderat) consists of 27 members. Since the 2021 local elections, it is made up of the following parties:

- Social Democratic Party of Austria (SPÖ): 16 seats
- Austrian People's Party (ÖVP): 7 seats
- Freedom Party of Austria (FPÖ): 3 seats
- The Greens The Green Alternative (GRÜNE): 1 seat

The current mayor is Dr. Margit Heissenberger (SPÖ). She took over Ferdinand Vouk in March 2026.

== Twin towns — sister cities ==
Velden am Wörther See is twinned with:

- Bled, Slovenia, since 2004
- Gemona del Friuli, Italy
- Jesolo, Italy, since 2006

== Gallery ==
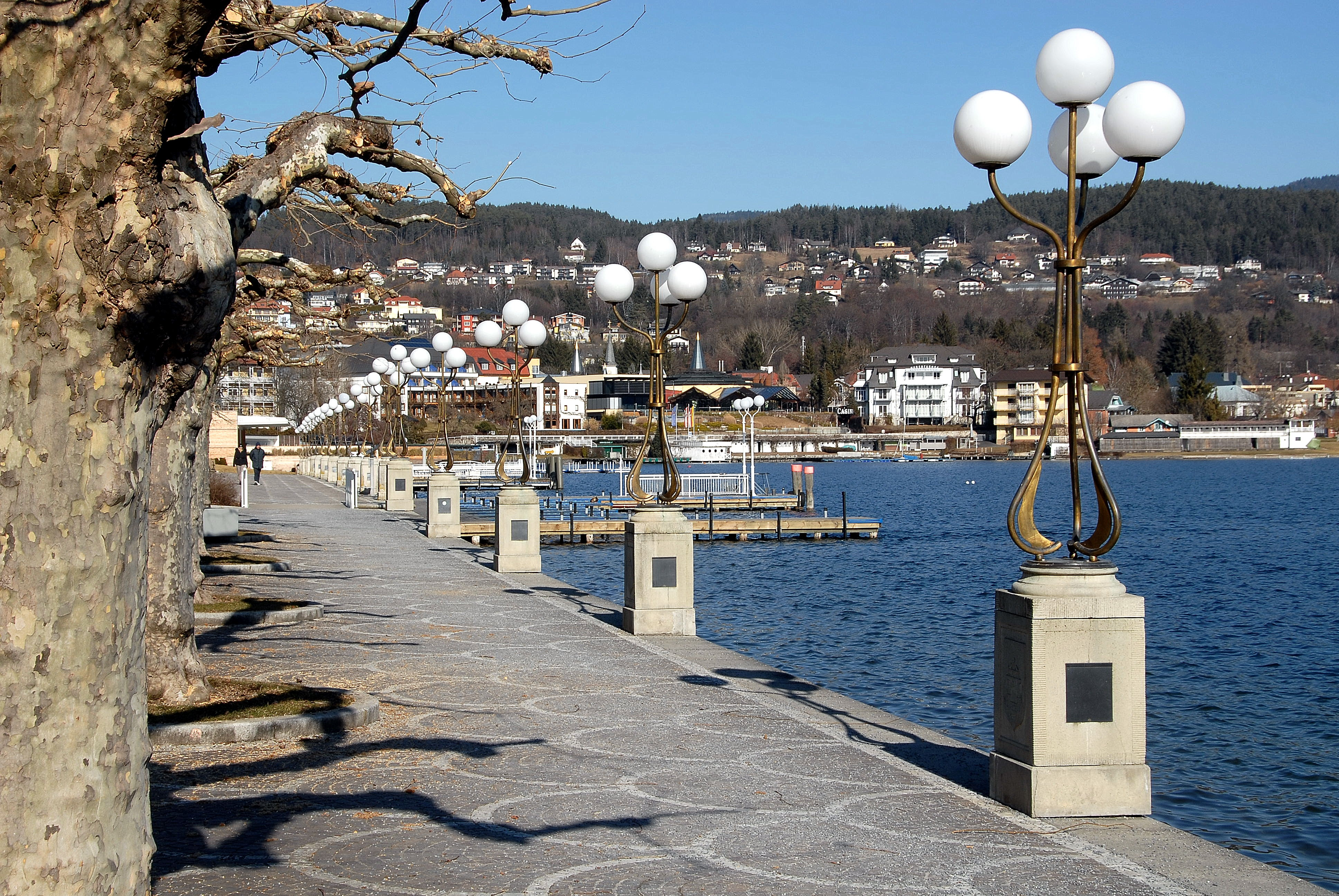
Seepromenade by the Lake Wörth in Velden

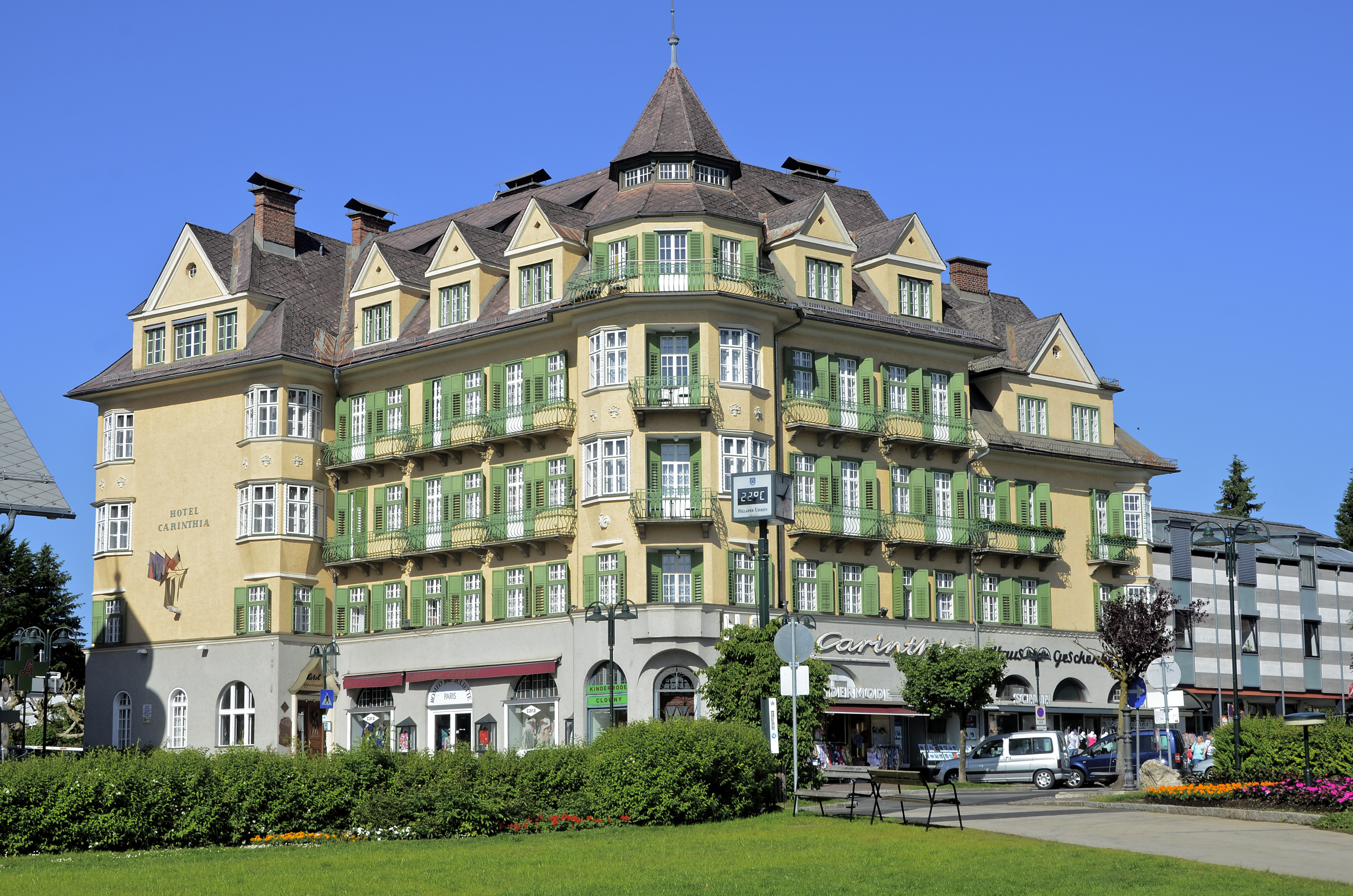
"Hotel Carinthia"

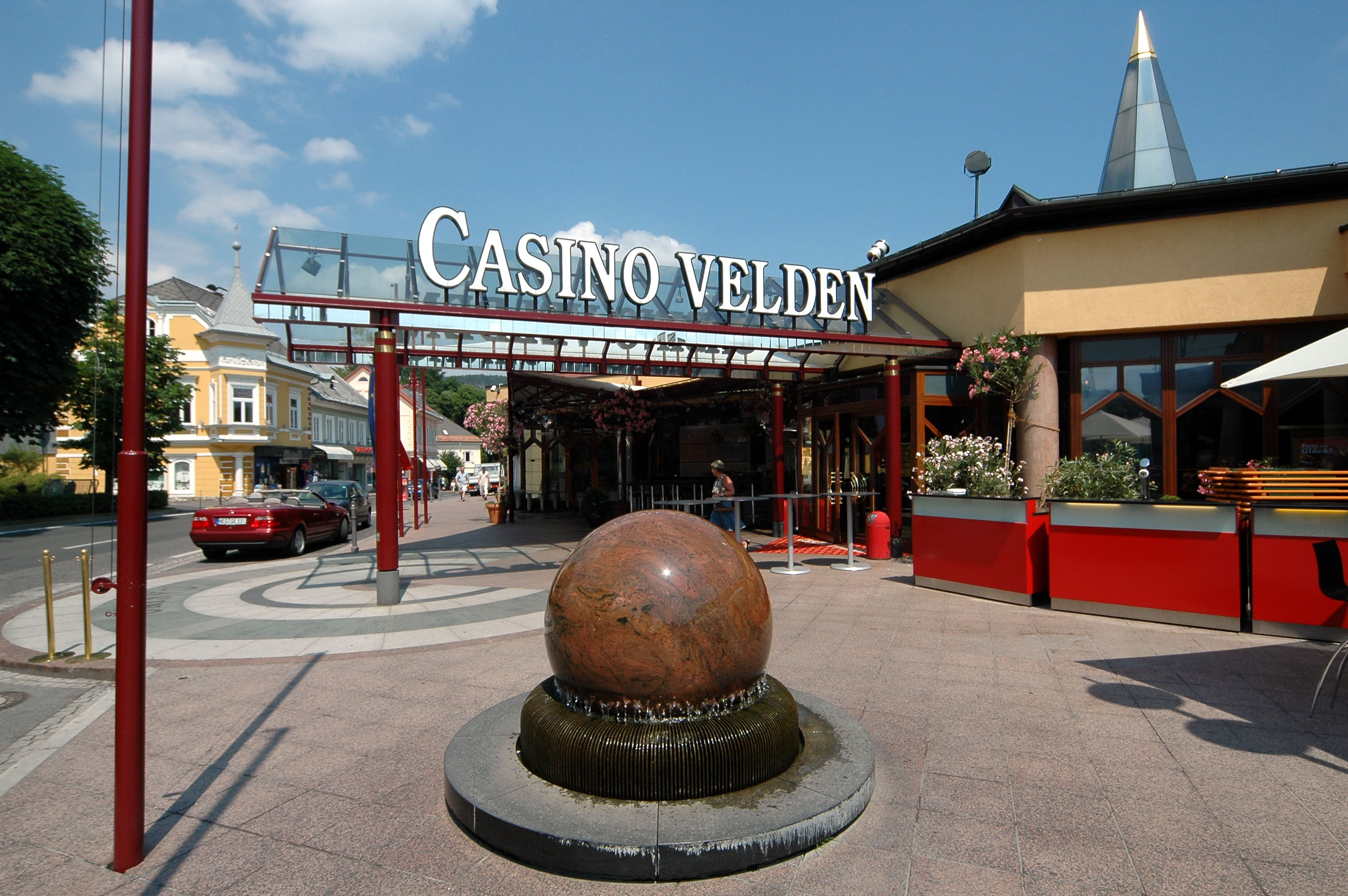
The Casino Velden

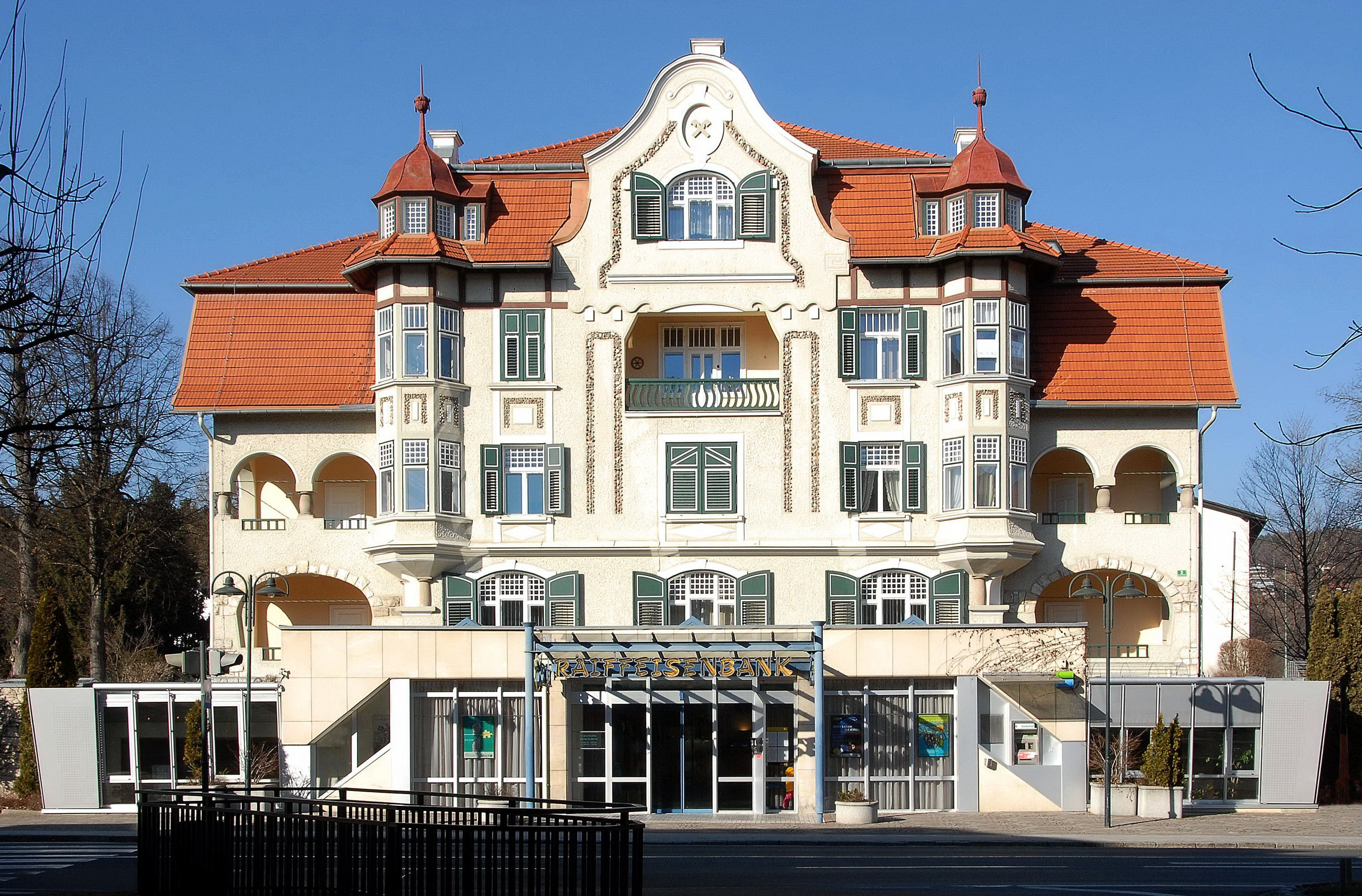
South view of the "Hotel Kointsch"

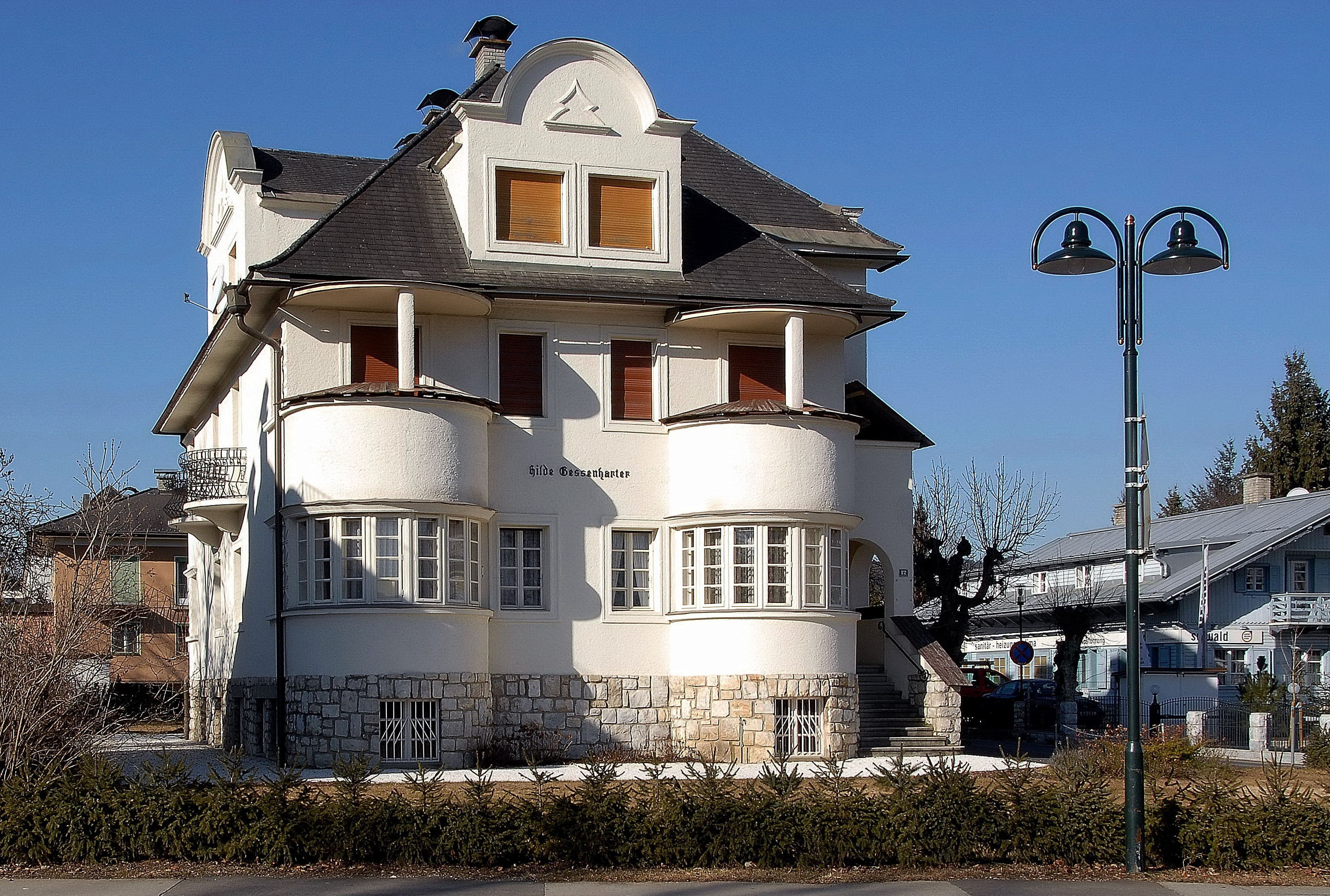
Villa Gessenharter

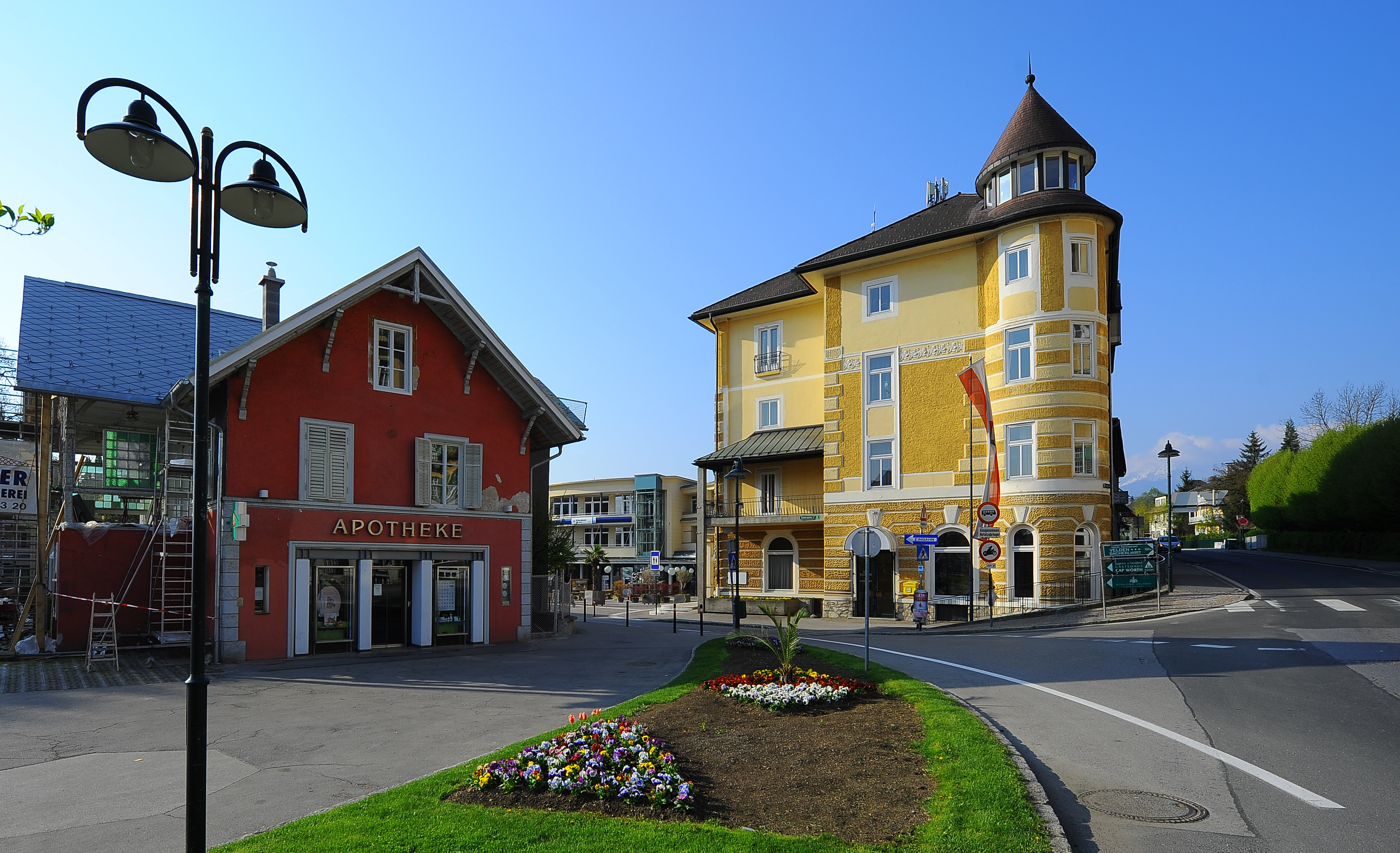
Town hall

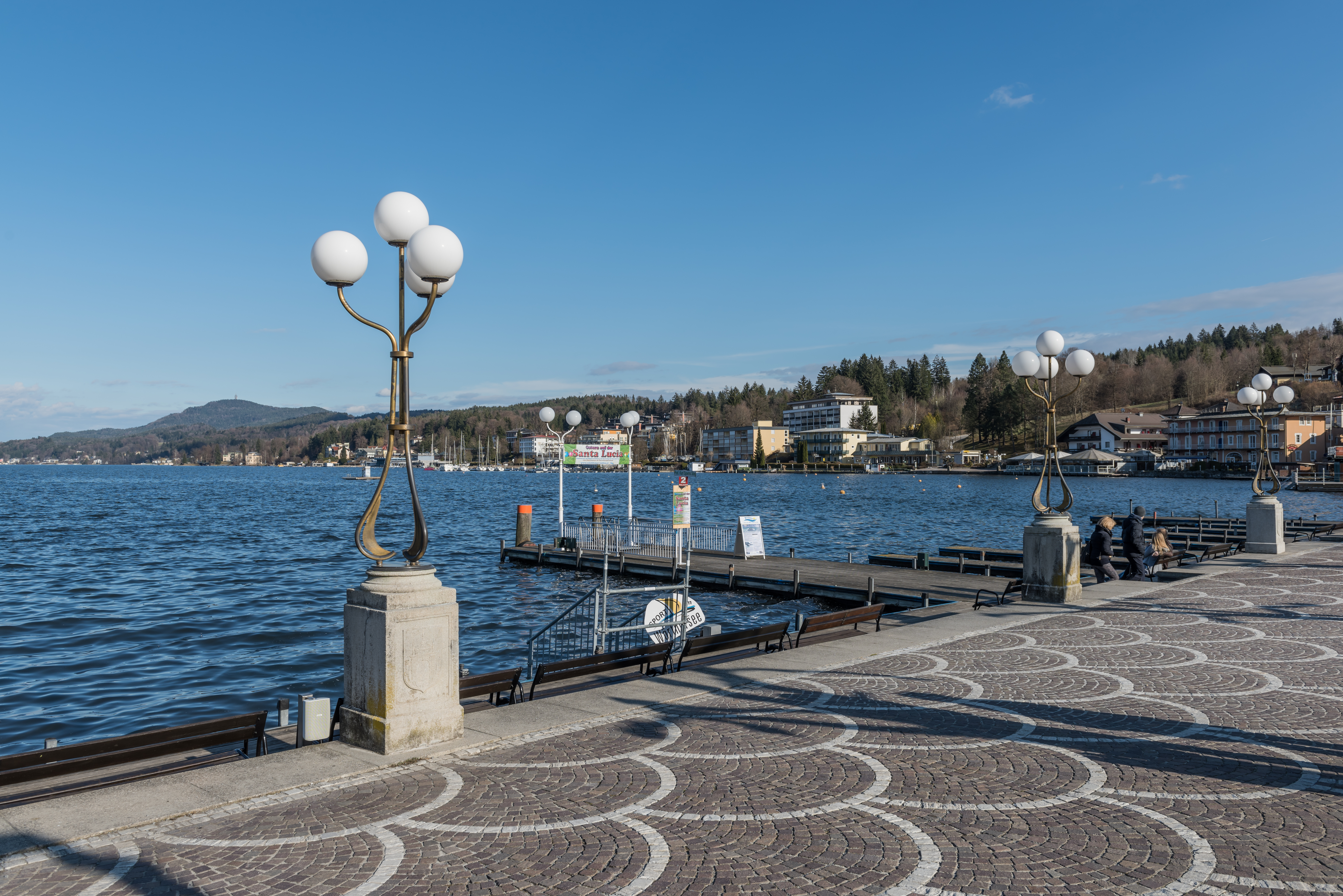
Seecorso promenade along the Lake Wörth
