= Woozy (artist) =

Greek artist

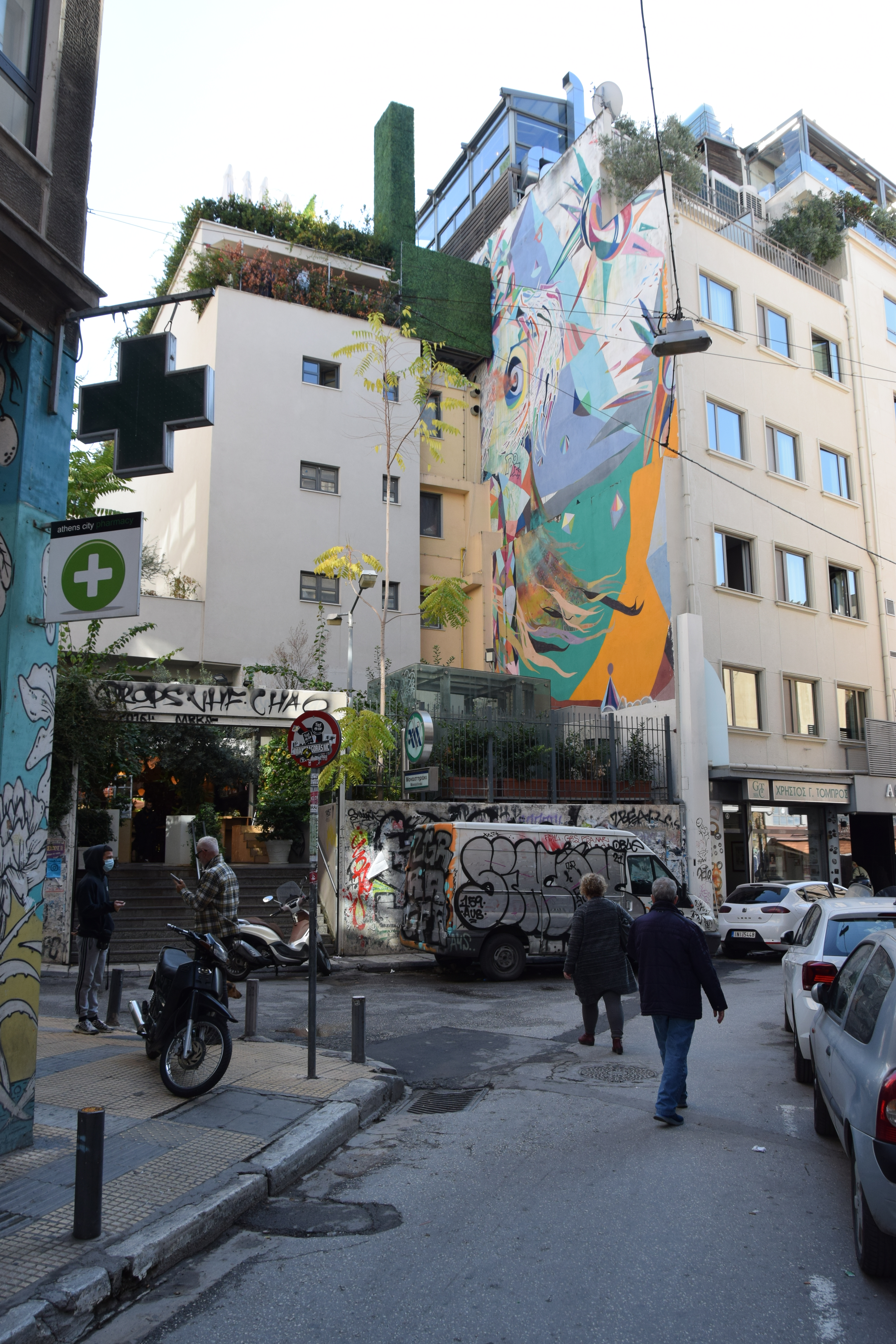
- A mural by Woozy in Psyri, 2021
- Born: Vaggelis Hoursoglou; 1979 (age 45–46); Athens, Third Hellenic Republic
- Education: Lisbon School of Fine Arts
- Alma mater: Athens School of Fine Arts
- Style: Street art
- Website: woozy.gr

Woozy is the tag of Greek street artist and muralist Vaggelis Hoursoglou (born 1979). He has been painting large-scale murals for nearly 20 years in a number of countries around the world. His work has been a crucial aspect in the graffiti scene in Greece.

== Overview ==
Vaggelis was born in 1979 in Athens-Greece, where he now lives and works. In 2004 he began his studies at the School of Fine Art in Athens, which he completed in 2010. During that period he spent a year at the Lisbon School of Fine Arts, Portugal as part of an exchange program. Since the completion of his studies, Vaggelis has worked on both commissioned and self-initiated projects in many countries around the world, including Denmark, Switzerland, China and Brazil. He has collaborated with numerous renowned street artists such as Blu, Loomit, Nunca, Ces and exhibited his work in various festivals including Chromopolis in Athens and the 2010 Mural exhibition in China. Using an ample colour palette, Vaggelis does not limit himself to one type of medium but rather, experiments with different textures and techniques.

== Large scale work ==
=== Athens ===
Vaggelis's home town Athens, is where his countless signatures, small and large-scale murals, cover walls in many parts of the city.

He began in 2005, with a 6 x 25m mural named My Neighbourhood, part of a collaboration project with his friends and fellow street artists Os Gemeos. Five years later Woozy painted a massive 25 x 15m wall at the most central part of Athens, outside the Monastiraki metro station. Titled as The Colorful Warrior this piece was done as part of a reconstruction pilot program. Along with Colorful Tsunami, a 20 x 12m mural in central Athens, they remain some of Woozy’s most renowned murals in the capital. In 2011 his work was featured at the Athens Concert Hall, with his commissioned piece Music For Your Eyes.

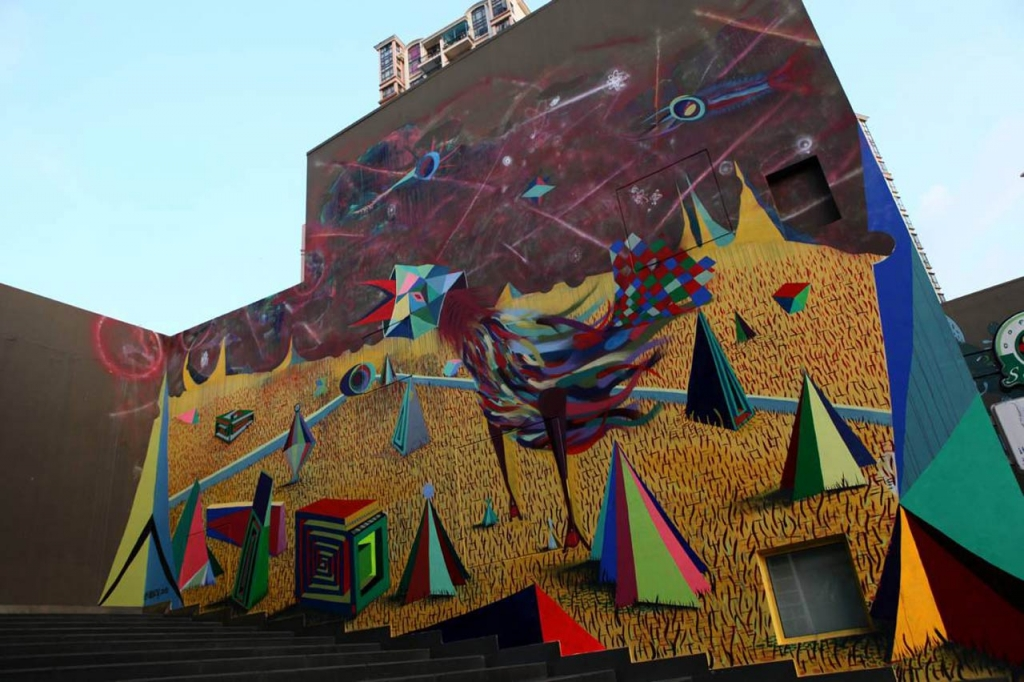
Woozy, Path of silk, 2010, Shenzhen

=== Portugal ===
Three years after his exchange program in Lisbon, Vaggelis revisited Portugal to collaborate with graffiti artist KEZ. They painted on dolosse, of the São Miguel island harbour and later on, in 2012 he did a piece titled Tropical Surprise, on an 18 x 6 m wall at a private home.

=== London ===
At his first solo show in London I Don’t Care About My Face (part of Steve Lazaride’s London project “The Dungeon”), he exhibited a collection of paintings on canvas. As part of the same project he was commissioned to do a mural on a 6 x 25m wall at Brick Lane, titled My Tribe.

=== China ===
In 2010, Vaggelis travelled to Shenzhen-China for the international Mural Exhibition, where he painted on the Dafen Art Museum wall an 8 x 13m mural entitled Path Of Silk. In 2011 he revisited Shenzhen, this time creating an even larger mural Ornithes covering an 8 x 24m wall of the OCT-LOFT Art Centre. Both projects were organised by URBANUS architecture team.

== Carpe Diem ==
Vaggelis Hoursoglou is the cofounder of Carpe Diem collective. Furthermore, he is the coeditor of the group’s publication also called Carpe Diem. Carpe Diem graffiti group was unofficially established in 1995 with the intention to support fine art interventions and promote creativity in the graffiti culture, by legally giving artists the chance to express themselves. This was achieved through various activities, events and seminars that were open to the public. The collective published two books with photos from the beginning of the graffiti scene in Greece, as well as the quarterly graffiti magazine Carpe Diem.

== Bibliography ==
- Iosifidis, Kyriakos (2008). MURAL ART - Murals on huge public surfaces around the world, Publikat KG publishing, Germany 2008
- Iosifidis, Kyriakos (2007). …in the streets, Metaichmio publishing, Athens 2007
- Manco, Tristan (2005). GRAFFITI BRASIL, Lost Art, Caleb Neelon, Thames & Hudson, 2005
- Ganz, Nicholas (2004). Graffiti World – Street art from five continents, Thames & Hudson, 2004
- Terzidis, Christos (2003). ΗΙP HOP DON’T STOP, ΟXY publishing, Athens 2003
- Iosifidis, Kyriakos (2002). Chromopolis. A different view of culture, Α.Ε. publishing, Athens 2002
- Iosifidis, Kyriakos (1998). The colour of the city (Graffiti in Greece), ΟXY publishing, Athens 1998

== Publications ==
- Iosifidis, Kyriakos (2008). Graffiti in schools, GEOTROPIO, Issue 452, 13 November 2008
- Kormaris, Paris (2005). A fairytale without wheels, EPSILON, Issue 755, 2 October 2005
- Makra, Tonia (2002). The walls can speak, TACHYDROMOS, Issue 120, 15 June 2002
- Graffiti – All the cities’ colours, ΚLIK, February, Issue 30, February 2001
- Vlagouli, Anna (2001). Graffiti unites the world, ΜΕΤRΟ, Issue 66, May 2001
- Hatzizisi, Kiveli (1999). Graffiti- The Adrenalin children, ΜARIE CLAIRE, Issue 123, February 1999

== Video links ==
- "files/press/carpe-diem-biennale". woozy.gr.
- "i dont care about my face on Vimeo". vimeo.com.
- "Prism - Archive - Multimedia Stories". theprism.tv.
- "the urban story of a grouse: the making of - YouTube". youtube.com.
