= Woozy (band) =

American experimental rock band

- Origin: New Orleans, Louisiana
- Genres: Experimental rock, power pop, emo
- Years active: 2012 – 2016
- Members: Kara Stafford; John St. Cyr; Ian Paine-Jesam
- Website: woozywoozywoozy.bandcamp.com

Woozy was an American experimental rock band from New Orleans.

== Career ==
Woozy was formed in 2012. In 2013, the band released a split album with the dreamgaze band Dogtooth titled Somebody Else's Problem. In September 2014, Woozy appeared on a split with Ex-Breathers, Ovlov and Gnarwhal. In October 2015, Woozy released their first full-length album titled Blistered.

In June 2016, allegations of sexual assault against Woozy member John St. Cyr were made public by Katryn Macko of the Florida band Naps. As a result, Woozy's other members Kara and Ian stated in a Facebook post that Woozy is no longer a band anymore.

== Band members ==
- Kara Stafford (vocals, guitar)
- John St. Cyr (vocals, guitar)
- Ian Paine-Jesam (drums)

== Discography ==
Studio albums

- Blistered (2015, Exploding In Sound Records, Community Records)

Splits

- Somebody Else's Problem (2013)
- Woozy/Ex-Breathers/Gnarwhal/Ovlov (2014)
