= Schloss Velden =

Coordinates: 46°36′42″N 14°02′36″E

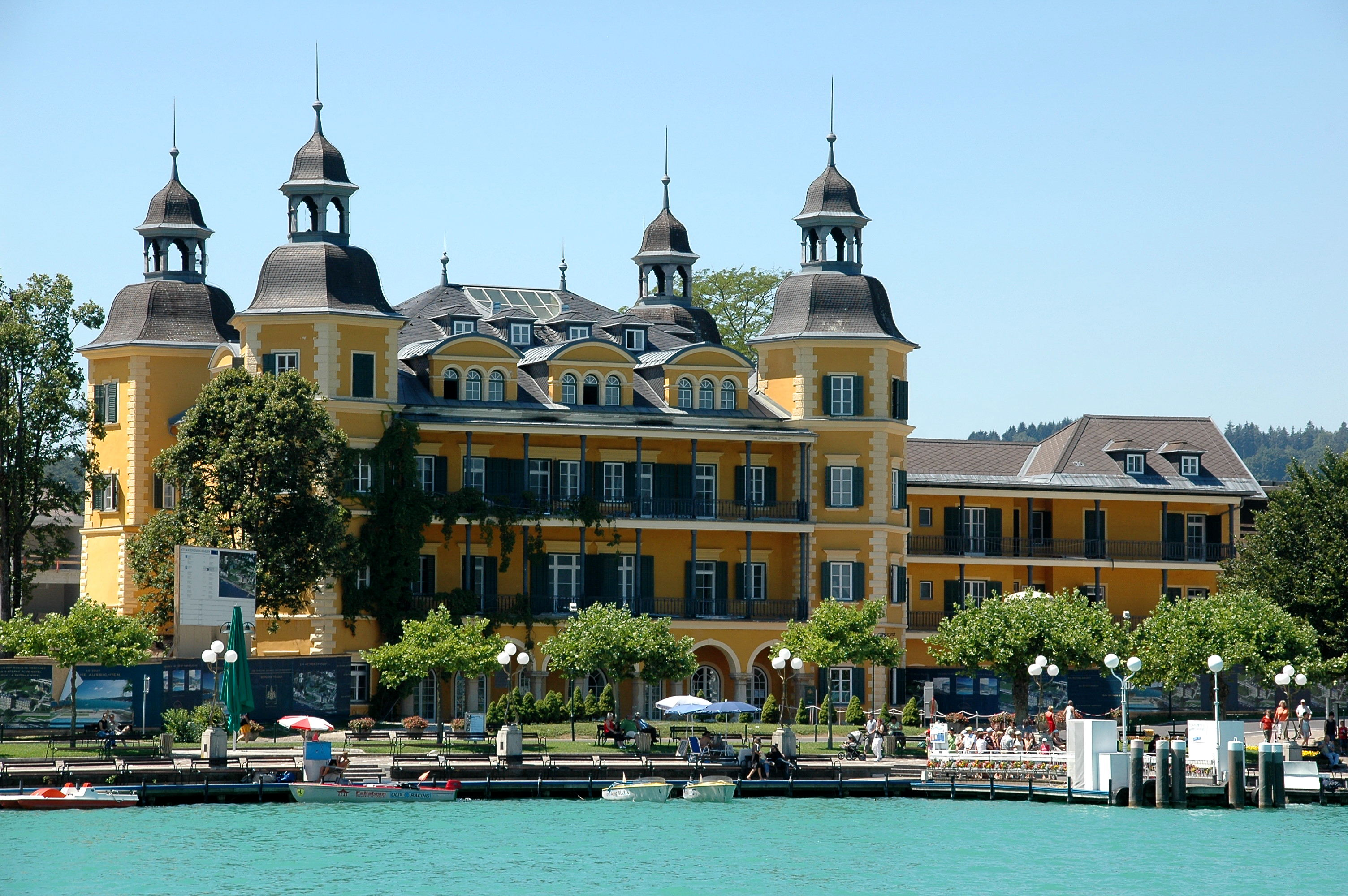
Schloss Velden, lakeside

Schloss Velden is a castle in the Austrian tourist resort of Velden am Wörther See, Carinthia. It is run as a year-round hotel located on the western shore of Lake Wörth (Wörthersee).

== History ==
The original Renaissance castle was erected from about 1590 onwards as a residence of count Bartholomäus Khevenhüller (1539–1613), Freiherr of Landskron, who had served as ministerialis of the Inner Austrian archduke Charles II. Finished in 1603, the Khevenhüllers lost it already in 1629, when the Protestant dynasty was expelled from the Carinthian lands by Charles' successor, Emperor Ferdinand II, during the Thirty Years' War. Emperor Ferdinand III sold the castle to the Dietrichstein noble family in 1639. Devastated by a blaze in 1762, the remnants were uses as an inn and a postal station. The Dietrichsteins held the Velden estates until 1861.

With tourism emerging on the Carinthian lakes in the late 19th century, Velden Castle was rebuilt in a Neo-Renaissance style and opened as a hotel in 1890. It soon became popular with celebrities and royalty. In 1990, the hotel reverted to being the private chateau of German industrialist Gunter Sachs. A backdrop for numerous film productions since the 1950s, Schloss Velden served as the setting for the Austrian/German TV series Ein Schloß am Wörthersee between 1990 and 1992, starring Roy Black. After the building was purchased by Hypo Alpe Adria Bank in 2003, it re-opened in summer 2007 under the direction of Horst Schulze, the founder of Ritz-Carlton and Capella, a hotel management company based in Atlanta, Georgia, under the Capella brand. The Hypo Alpe Adria group sold the premises to Karl Wlaschek in 2011.

== Awards ==
- Schlossstern Gourmet Restaurant
  - 2 Michelin Stars
  - 3 'Hauben' Gault Millau awards
- Auriga Spa
  - Best Spa in Austria award by Gault Millan
  - European Health & Spa Award 2009 ("Best Destination Spa")
