= Architectural Digest (Germany) =

German architecture magazine

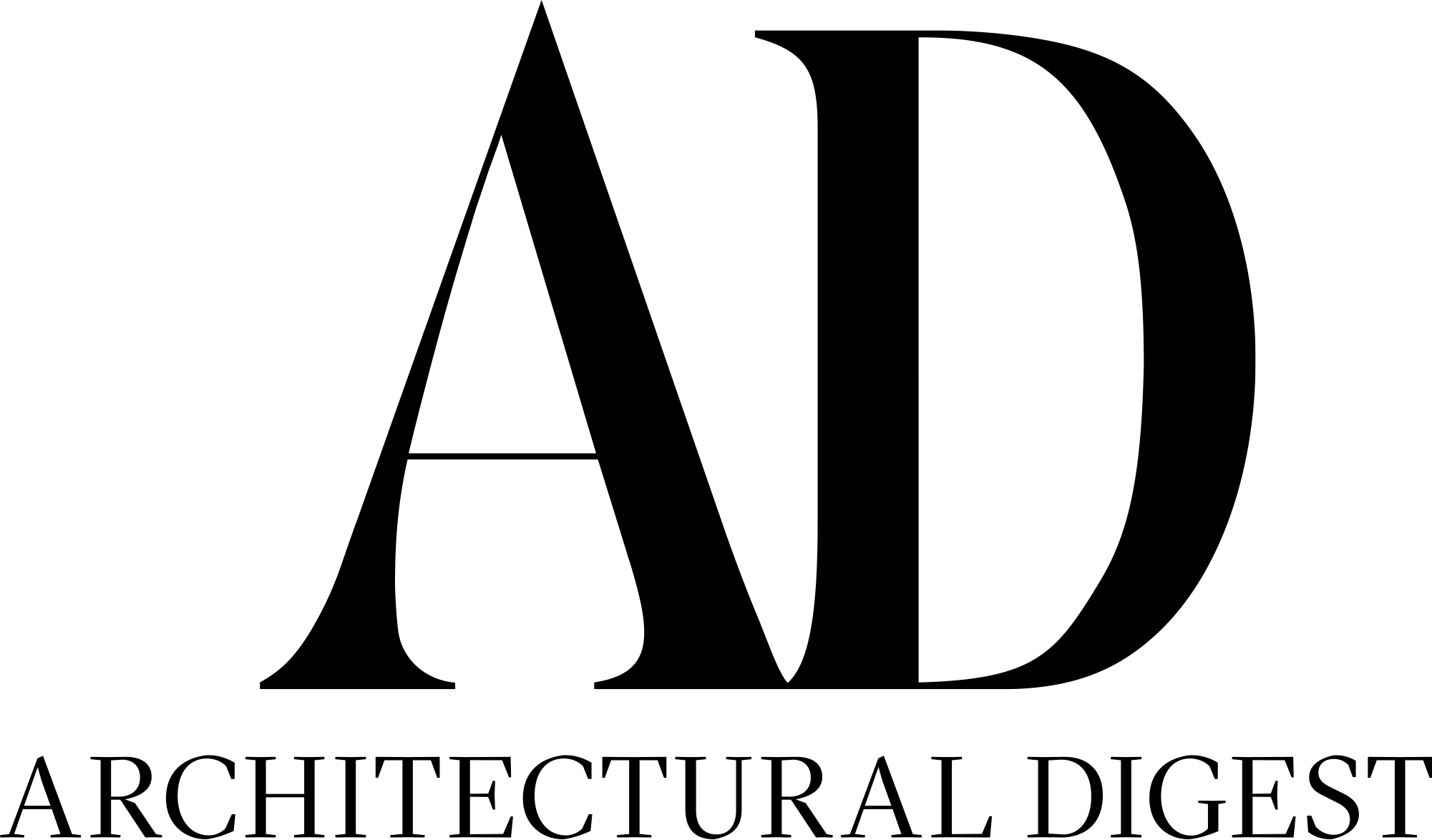
- Categories: Architecture magazine
- Frequency: Bimonthly; Ten times per year
- Publisher: Condé Nast Verlag GmbH
- Founded: 1996
- First issue: January 1997
- Company: Condé Nast
- Country: Germany
- Based in: Munich
- Language: German
- Website: Architectural Digest
- ISSN: 1433-1764
- OCLC: 85487245

Architectural Digest (also known as AD) is an architecture magazine based in Munich, Germany. The magazine is the German edition of the US magazine with the same name. It is the third edition of the magazine after the US and Italian editions.

== History and profile ==
Architectural Digest was established in 1996. The first issue appeared in January 1997. The magazine was started as a bi-monthly publication. The owner of the magazine is Condé Nast. It is published by Condé Nast Verlag GmbH ten times a year and covers articles related to architecture and interior design.

The headquarters of Architectural Digest was first in Munich. Then it moved to Berlin, but then its headquarters returned to Munich.

Ulrike Filter was the launching editor-in-chief of Architectural Digest. Ingrid von Werz replaced her in the post in November 1999. Her term ended in July 2000 when Margit J. Mayer was named the editor-in-chief of the magazine. As of 2016 Oliver Jahn was the editor-in-chief of the magazine.

Architectural Digest is the media partner of the Highlights, an international art fair in Munich.
