= Dafen Art Museum =

Art museum in Shenzhen, China

Coordinates: 22.6126°N 114.1335°E

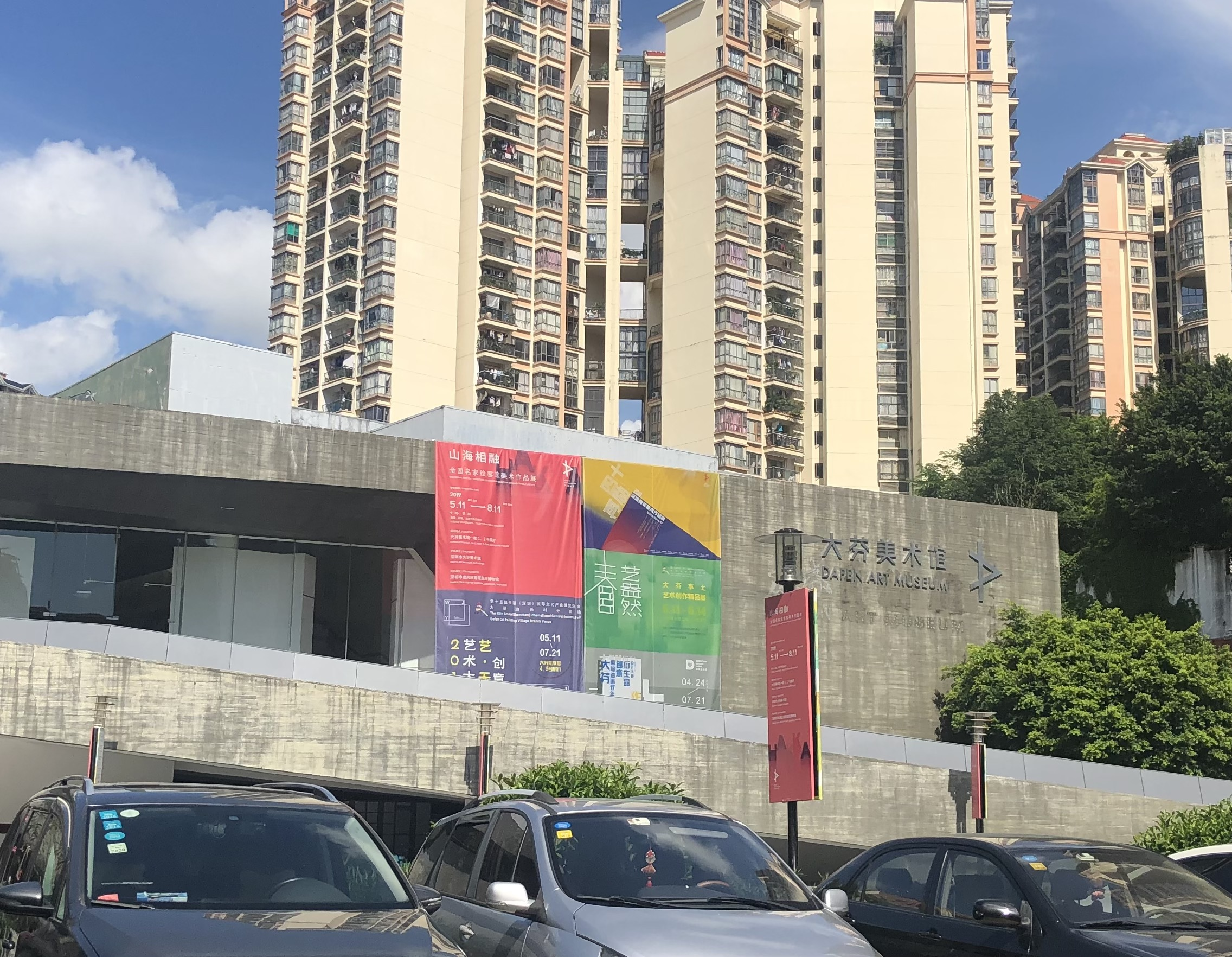
The exterior, with the English-language name of the museum

The Dafen Art Museum (Chinese: 大芬美术馆) is an art museum located in the Dafen Village suburb of Shenzhen in China.

It was designed by the Chinese architectural firm Urbanus, and was completed in 2007. It was built with an investment of 100 million yuan from the Chinese government with the purpose of attracting tourism and changing outside perception of Dafen as a center for low quality replica art. The museum contains a mix of spaces for local vendors to sell art and gallery spaces for exhibitions.

== Gallery ==
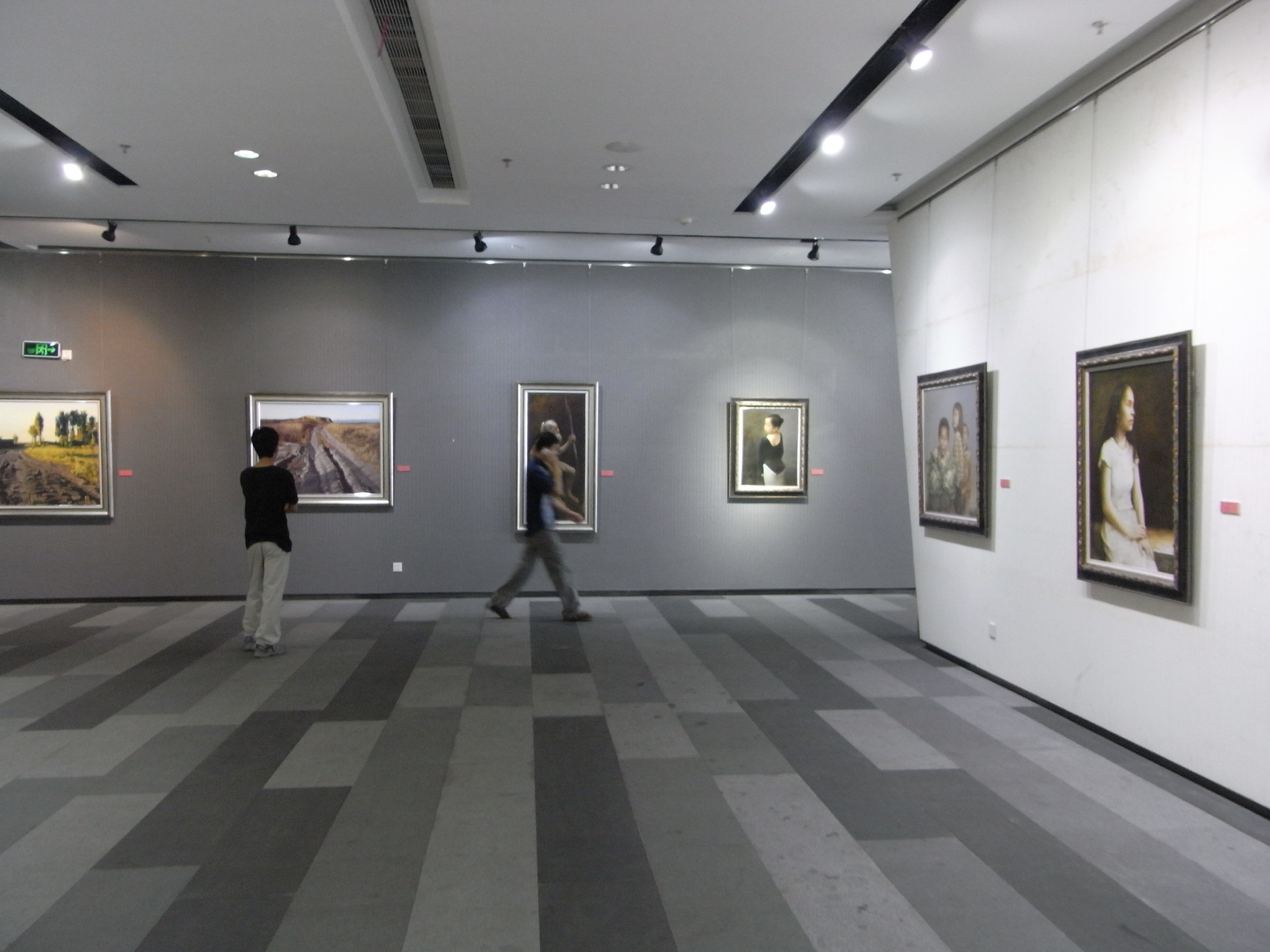
Dafen Art Museum interior
