= High Commission of Pakistan, Ottawa =

Diplomatic mission of Pakistan to Canada

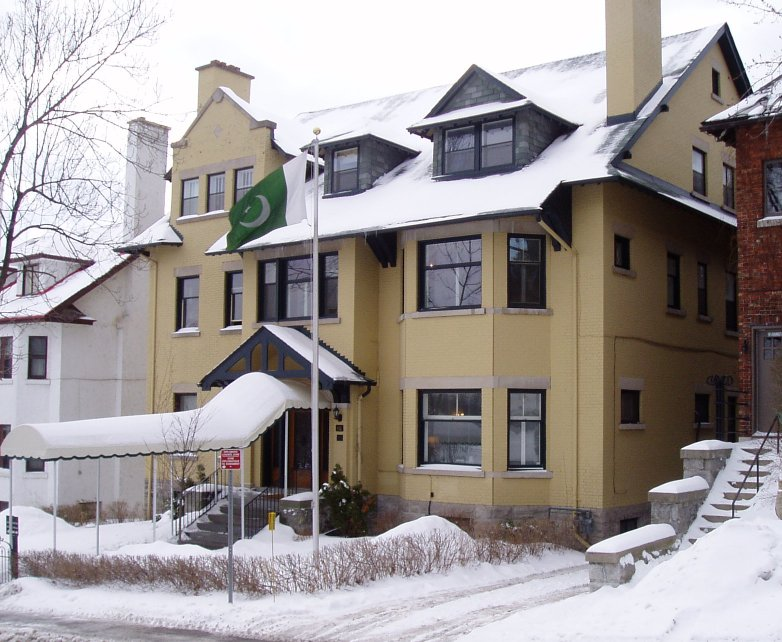
- Location: Sandy Hill, Ottawa
- Address: 10 Range Road
- Coordinates: 45°25′40.5″N 75°40′26.5″W
- Jurisdiction: Canada
- High Commissioner: Shah Faisal Kakar
- Website: Official website

The High Commission of Pakistan in Ottawa is the diplomatic mission of Pakistan to Canada.

The chancery is located at 10 Range Road in the Sandy Hill neighbourhood among a cluster of other embassies.

== History ==
It overlooks Strathcona Park and beyond it the Rideau River. The building was constructed for future Supreme Court Chief Justice Francis Anglin in 1912. It was designed by prominent Ottawa architect Werner Ernst Noffke. The building was purchased by Pakistan in 2004 for $1.1 million under the ambassadorial tenure of Shahid Malik. Before this the embassy had been located in an office building on Slater Street in downtown. The embassy had previously been located in Sandy Hill, but in 1975 it had been gutted by fire. The ambassadorial residence is located at 190 Coltrin Road in Rockcliffe Park.

== List of high commissioners in Canada ==
- Zaheer Aslam Janjua (2022; present)
- Raza Bashir Tarar (2019; 2022)
- Tariq Azim Khan (2015 – 2018)
- Mian Gul Akbar Zeb
- Shahid Malik
- Musa Javed Chohan
- Naela Chohan
- Farouk Rana, 1996
