= Plaza de Pakistán =

- Interactive map of Plaza de Pakistán
- Type: Urban park
- Location: Parque Tres de Febrero, Palermo in Buenos Aires, Argentina
- Coordinates: 34.5640688°S 58.4238872°W
- Created: 2012
- Operator: Ministry of Environment and Public Spaces, Buenos Aires

The Plaza de Pakistán (Spanish: Plaza República Islámica de Pakistán, Urdu: پلازہ دے پاکستان) is a landmark in Buenos Aires, Argentina, commemorating Argentine–Pakistani friendship. It is located in the heart of Parque Tres de Febrero in the neighborhood of Palermo. It was redesigned in 2012 and inaugurated on July 27, 2012 by ambassador Naela Chohan of Pakistan and minister Diego Santilli of the Autonomous City of Buenos Aires, to commemorate the 60th anniversary of the establishment of the diplomatic relations between the two friendly countries. The park holds at its center a plaque with an engraving of a verse by Allama Iqbal (1877-1938), the national poet of Pakistan, emphasizing the importance of love for humanity both in Persian and Spanish.

== Inauguration ==
The inauguration ceremony of Plaza de Pakistan was planned between Pakistan's Independence Day on August 14 and the Independence Day of Argentina on July 9. It was also to commemorate the 60th anniversary of the establishment of the diplomatic relations between the two nations. The ceremony included the ribbon cutting by ambassador Naela Chohan and minister Diego Santilli, followed by the unveiling of the plaque with an engraving of a verse by Allama Iqbal which emphasises the importance of love for humanity.

Minister Diego Santilli in his speech, while appreciating the ambassador Naela Chohan for her role in the renovation of the park, stated that the whole world was reflected in the City of Buenos Aires through its monuments, squares and parks and that Pakistan had a very special place in it.

Ambassador Chohan thanked Chief of Government Mauricio Macri and Minister Diego Santilli for their support and added that "We deeply appreciate this important gesture of friendship and we need to further deepen these bonds of friendship through mutually beneficial co-operation in trade and culture."

As a memorial and representation of the two countries, a cedrus deodara and a ceiba, the two national trees of Pakistan and Argentina respectively, were planted by Chohan and Santilli, assisted by officials of the government of the Autonomous City of Buenos Aires.

== Location ==
The Plaza de Pakistán is located in the heart of Parque Tres de Febrero, an urban park of approximately 400 hectares (about 989 acres) located in the neighborhood of Palermo in Buenos Aires, Argentina between Libertador and Figueroa Alcorta Avenues. The Parque Tres de Febrero lies adjacent to the Hipodromo Argentino de Palermo.

== Iqbal plaque ==
The Plaza contains at its center a black marble plaque with an engraving of a verse by Allama Iqbal, the national poet of Pakistan, which emphasises the importance of love for humanity both in Persian and Spanish. The verse is as follows:

آدمیت احترام آدم است
برتراز گردوں مقام آدم است

Transliteration: Admiyat ehtaram-e-aadam ast; bartaraz-e-gardon maqaam-e-aadam ast.

English Translation:

It is our love for humanity which makes us human, and it is our humanity which transcends the universe.

== See also ==
- Argentina–Pakistan relations
- Muhammad Iqbal
