= Safico Building =

Coordinates: 34.6034°S 58.3732°W

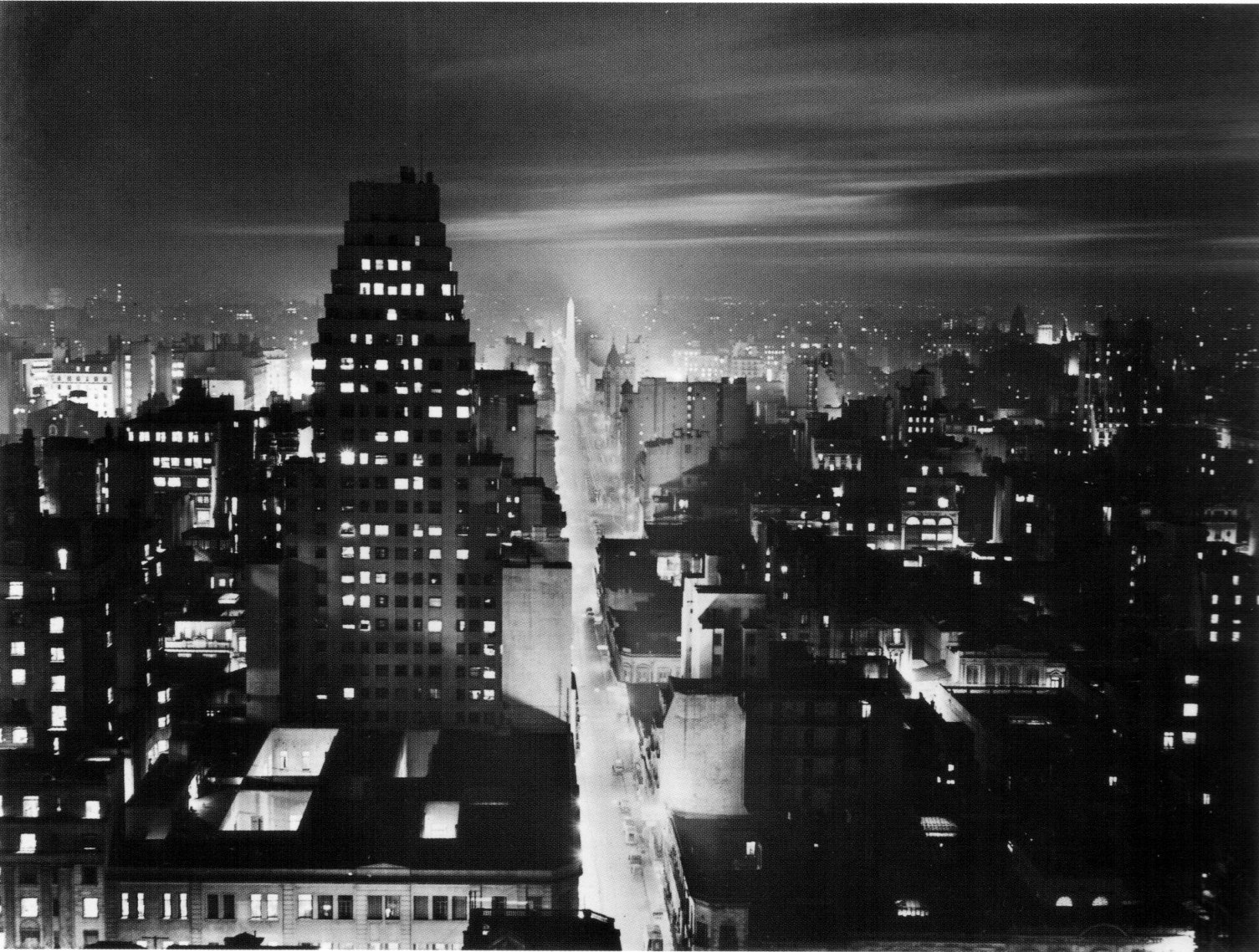
The Safico Building photographed by Horacio Coppola from the Comega Building in 1936

The Safico Building is a 90-metre (300 ft) rationalist and art-déco skyscraper with some Bauhaus elements, built out of reinforced concrete in Buenos Aires, Argentina in 1933.

The construction was carried out by Swiss engineer Walter Möll and was completed in 10 months becoming one of the first skyscrapers of the city, only shorter than a few buildings in Buenos Aires, such as the Palacio Barolo.

It contains both residential apartments and offices. Since the 1940s, important international media companies set their Argentine offices in the Safico Building, such as The Washington Post, the Financial Times, BBC and Reuters.

Nobel Prize Laureate Pablo Neruda lived for a few months in the building when he worked as a diplomat. He wrote the second part to Residence on Earth while living there, as well as a few other poems. Spanish poet Federico García Lorca also went to the building many times to visit him.

Its architectural relevance made it the building in which the Art-Déco World Congress took place in 2019, when it was visited by architects from all over the world.

== Gallery ==
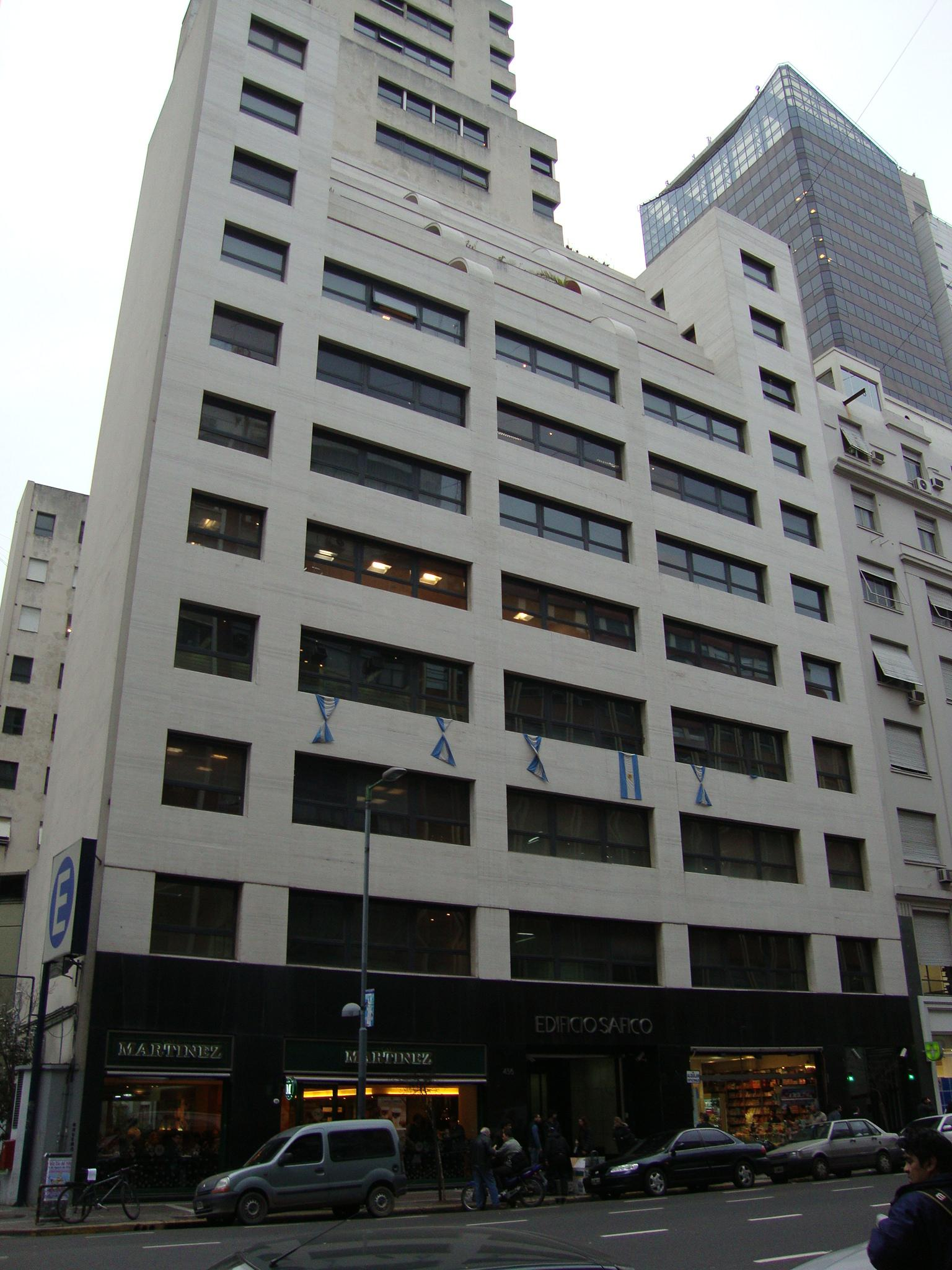
Facade

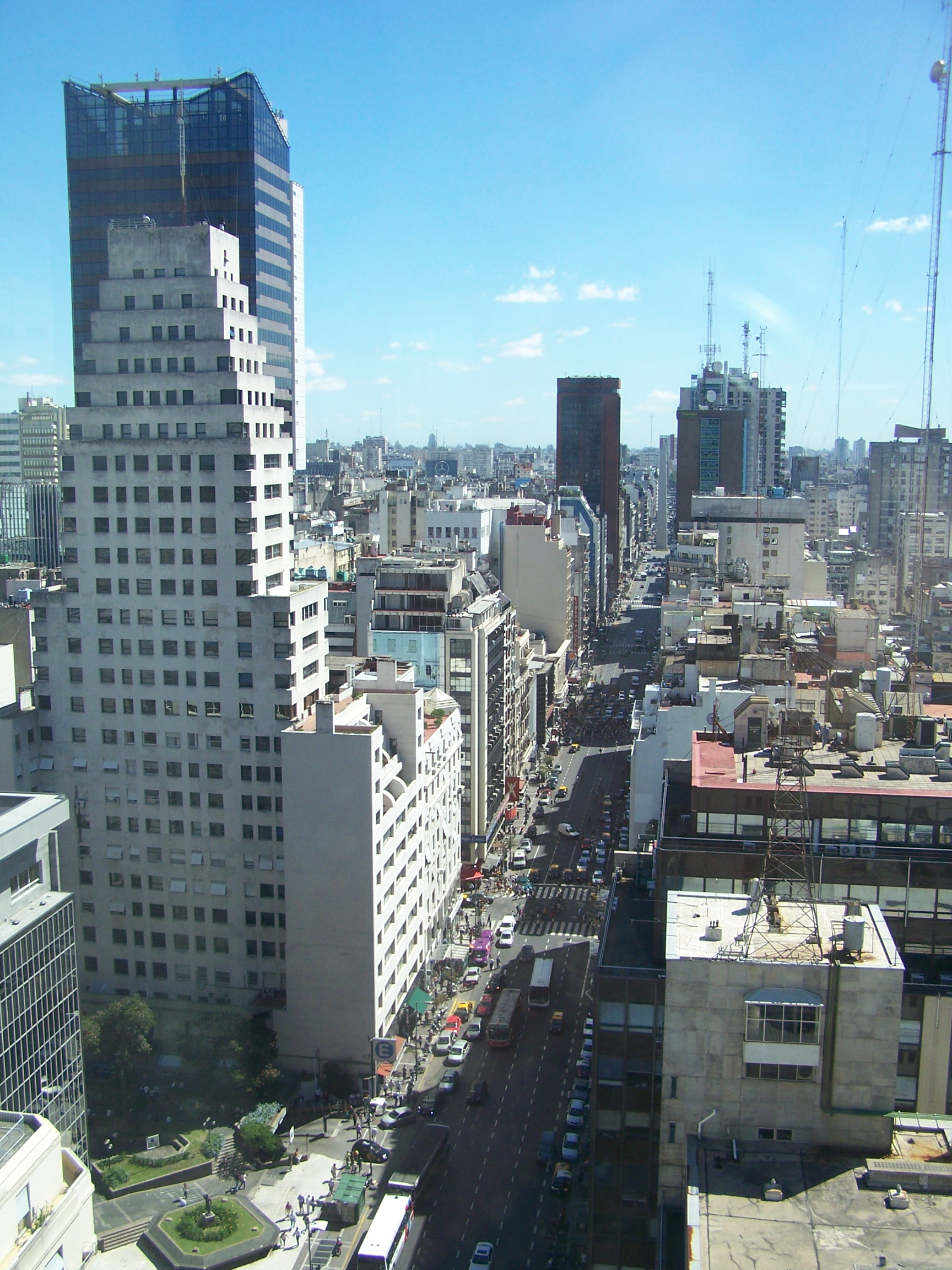
The building in the present

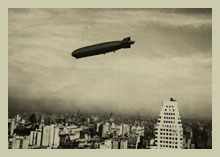
The Graff Zeppelin flying over the Safico Building

== See also ==
- Kavanagh Building
- Palacio Barolo
- Architecture of Argentina
