= 190 Coltrin Road =

Residence of the High Commissioner of Pakistan in Ottawa, Canada

Coordinates: 45°27′15″N 75°40′57.5″W

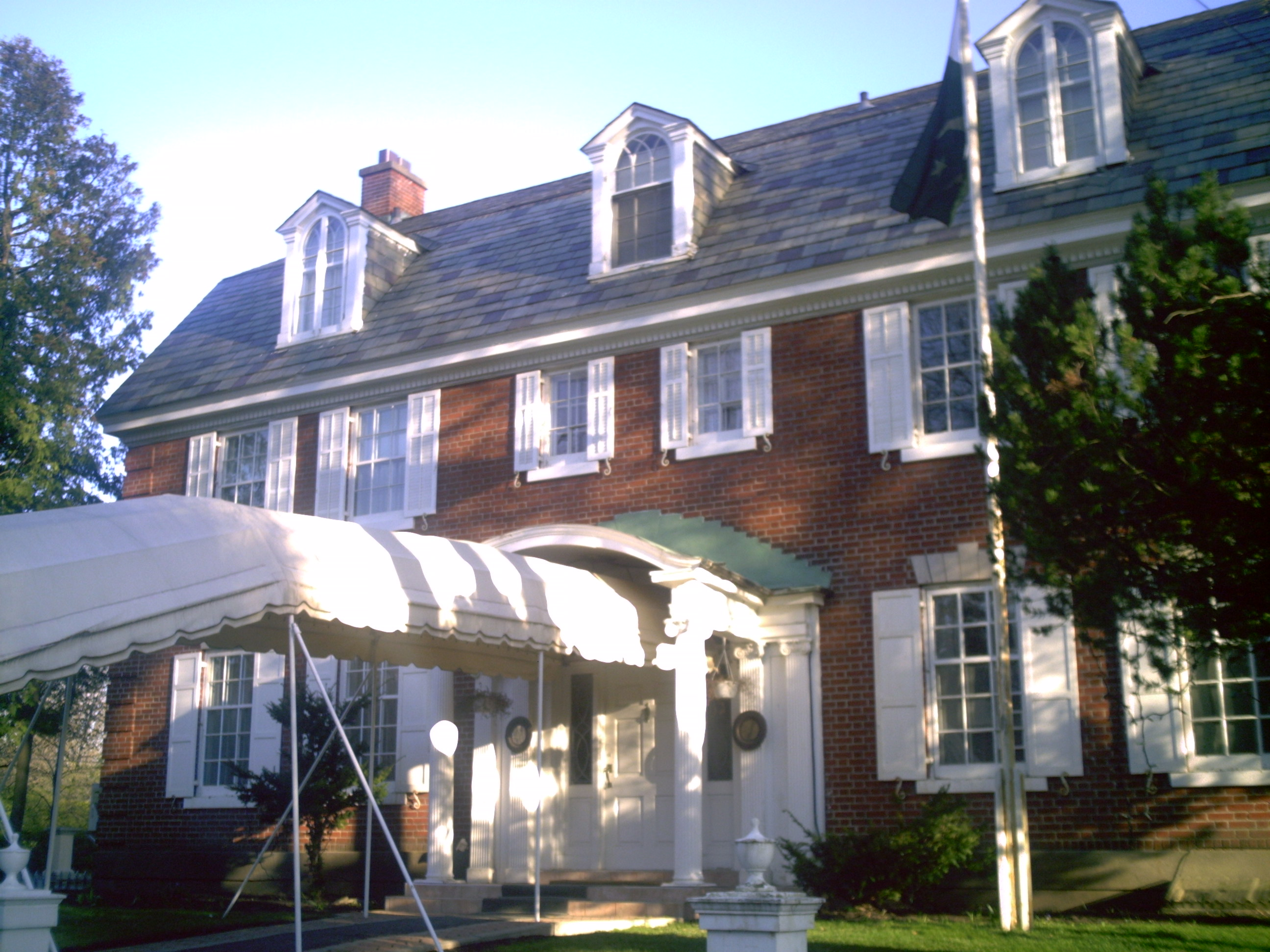
Front View of the Residence

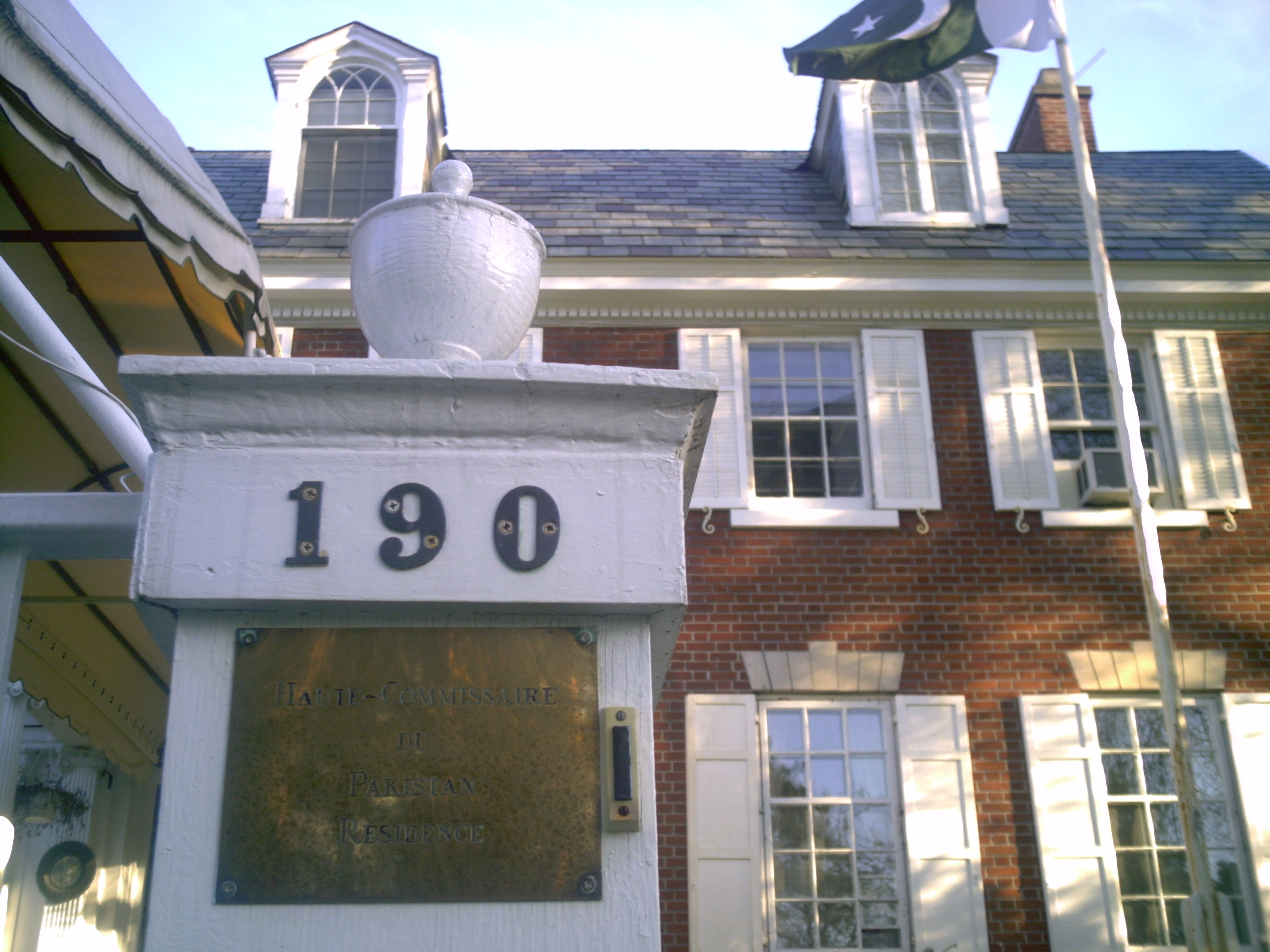
Entrance to the Residence

190 Coltrin Road is the residence of the High Commissioner of Pakistan in Ottawa, Ontario, Canada. It is located in the enclave of Rockcliffe Park amongst other prestigious ambassadorial residences. It was constructed in 1929 and is considered an important historical site, according to the Local Architectural Conservation Advisory Committee of Rockcliffe Park, under the Ontario Heritage Act (1974).

== History ==
190 Coltrin Road was designed by Clarence Burritt in 1929 for the son and daughter of G. H. Millen, former president of the E. B. Eddy Company. The house was briefly owned by W. Garfield Weston of the Weston Bakeries empire. It was bought by Pakistan in 1949 as a residence for their high commissioner. Since then, it has served for more than five decades as the residence of the High Commissioner of Pakistan to Canada.

== Architecture ==
190 Coltrin Road was made with the intention of incorporating several architectural styles, including:

- The Georgian Revival, as depicted in the Ionic columns at the entrance and dentils on the cornice.
- The Gothic Revival, in the details of its dormer windows
- Colonial New England, in the red brick facade and symmetric white picket fence.

== Ambassadorial Residence ==
This residence has historically seated almost all Pakistani High Commissioners:

- Shahid Malik
- Musa Javed Chohan
- Naela Chohan
- Akbar Zeb

== Trivia ==
A small seed that Liaqat Ali Khan planted on this residence on June 1, 1951, now stands as one of the tallest trees in Rockcliffe Park.
