= Rodolfo J. Martin-Saravia =

Argentine diplomat

Argentine Ambassador to Pakistan
- In office 2004–2016

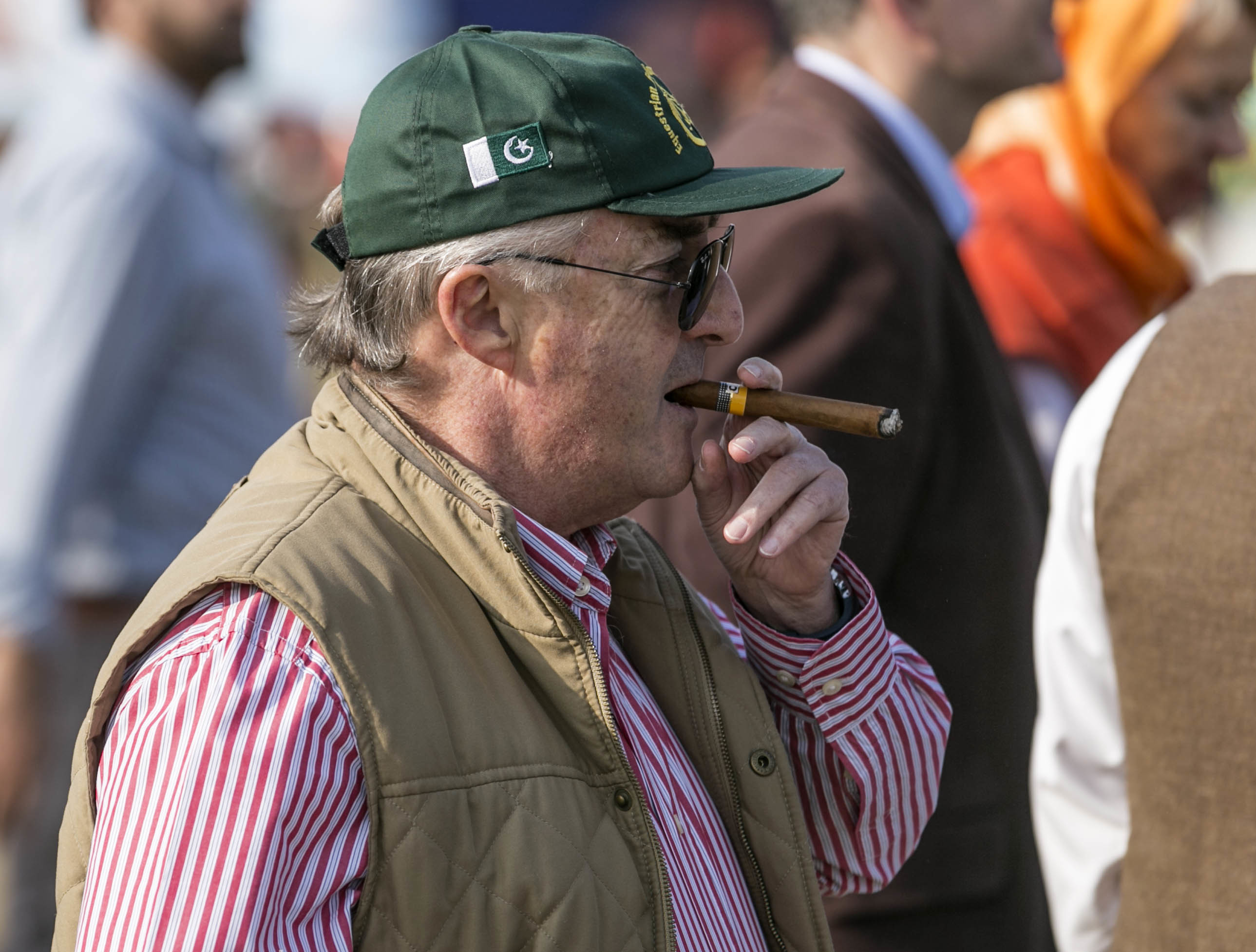
Rodolfo J. Martin-Saravia guest at a local tent pegging competition held near Islamabad in November 2015

Rodolfo J. Martin-Saravia is the former ambassador of Argentina to Pakistan. He served as ambassador to Pakistan from August 2004 to 2016, and has also served as the non-resident Argentine ambassador to Afghanistan and Tajikistan since 2005 and 2011 respectively. In March 2014, he was conferred the Hilal-e-Pakistan, the second highest civilian award in Pakistan, by President Mamnoon Hussain for his services to Argentina–Pakistan relations.
