= Avenida Leandro N. Alem =

Street in Buenos Aires, Argentina

Coordinates: 34°36′11″S 58°22′13″W

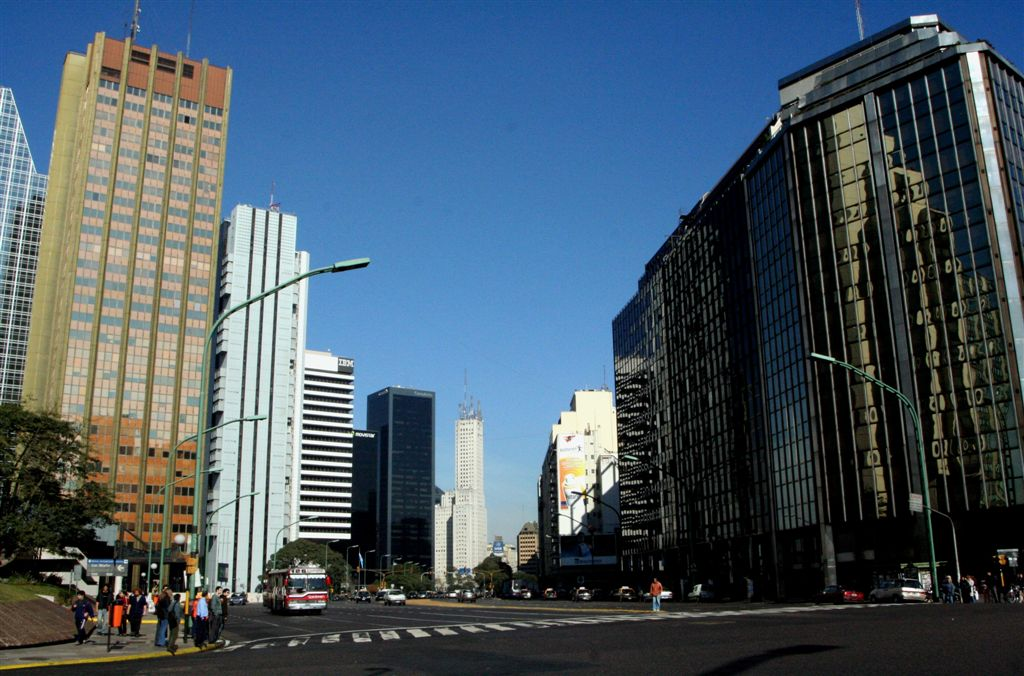
Northern end of Alem Avenue

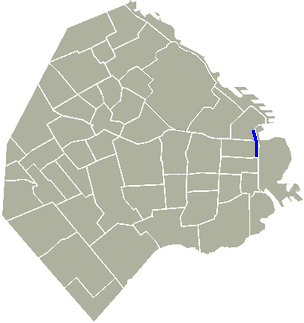
Location of Avenida Leandro N. Alem in Buenos Aires.

Avenida Leandro N. Alem is one of the principal thoroughfares in Buenos Aires, Argentina, and a commercial nerve center of the city's San Nicolás and Retiro districts. It joins Avenida del Libertador and Avenida Paseo Colón, its northern and southern continuation respectively.

== Overview ==
By way of a beautification effort, Viceroy Juan José de Vértiz y Salcedo had a two-lane street built along what was then the shores of the Río de la Plata. Marking the eastern end of the city, the thoroughfare was landscaped with cottonwood trees (alamos, in Spanish), and was thus inaugurated in 1780 as the Paseo de la Alameda. The paseo became a popular weekend promenade, and its contiguous shores an unofficial riverfront park popular with bathers until an 1809 edict banned the practice for reasons of "moral terpitude."

The frontage remained flood-prone, and in 1846, Governor Juan Manuel de Rosas had a contention wall six blocks long built along the paseo. Inaugurated in March 1848 as the Paseo Encarnación Ezcurra (in honor of his wife), Rosas had it renamed the Paseo de Julio that October in honor of the Ninth of July, date of the Argentine Declaration of Independence (the road's southern half was renamed Paseo Colón, in honor of Christopher Columbus, in 1857). An English Argentine investor, Edward Taylor, opened a pier along the promenade in 1855, and the flood-control walls were extended northwards to Recoleta, and south to San Telmo, in subsequent works completed in 1865.

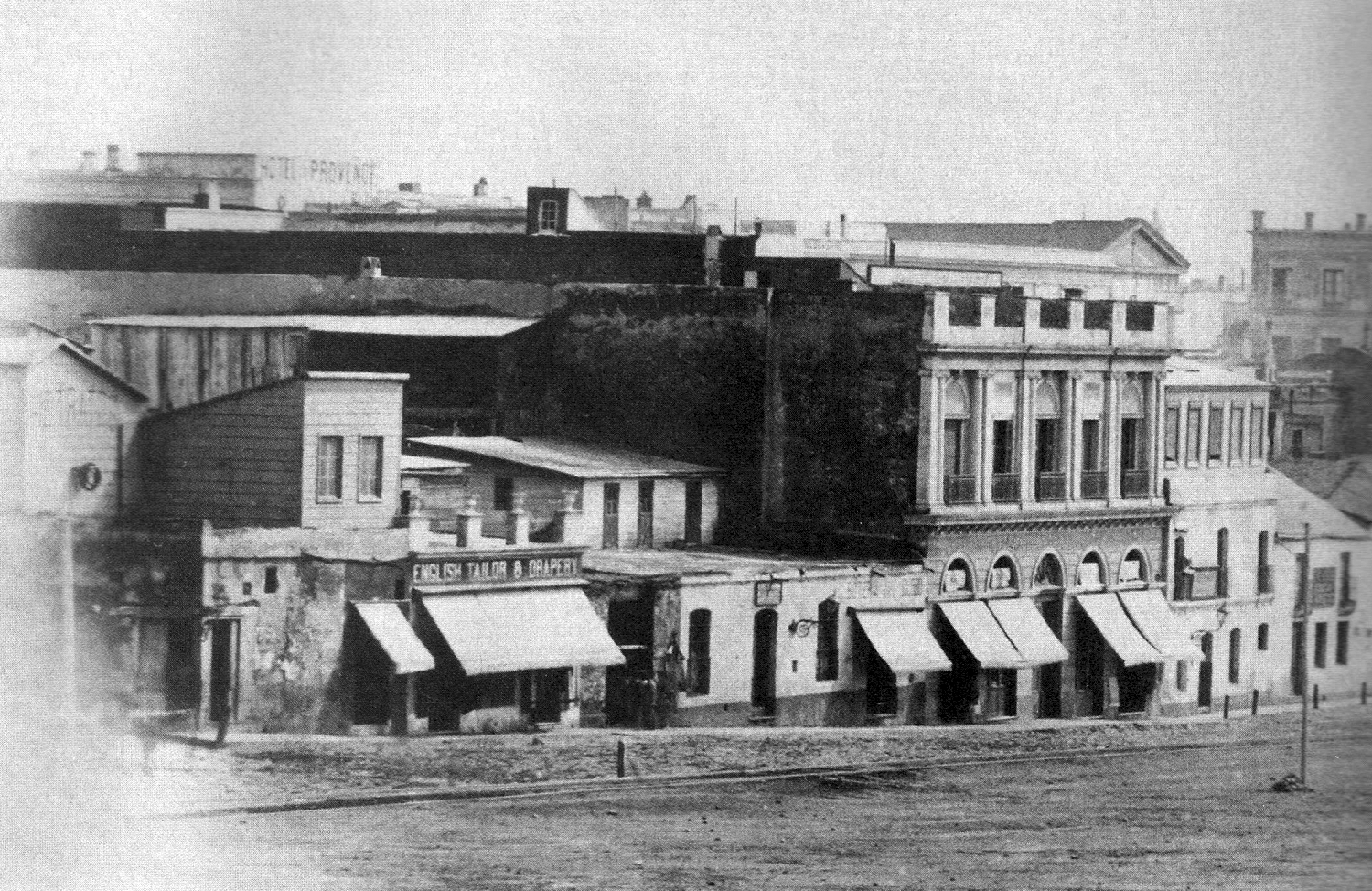
The Paseo de Julio in 1867

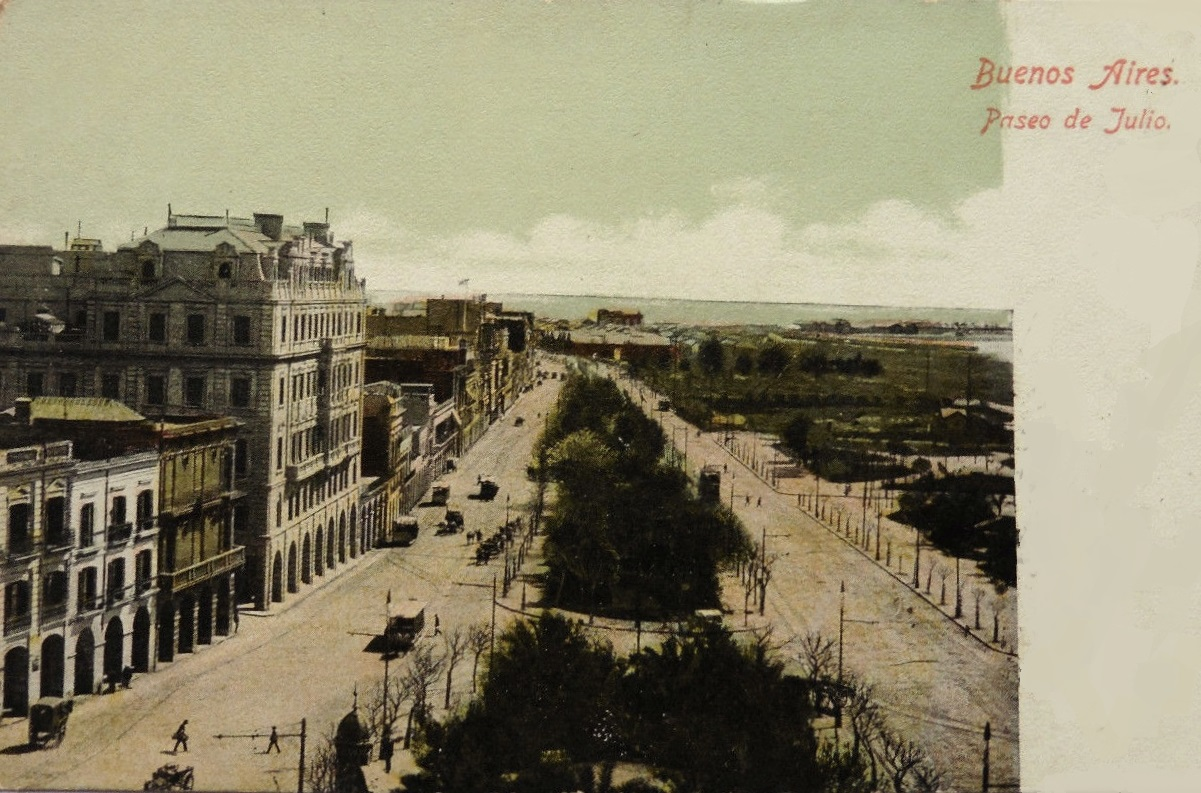
The Paseo de Julio at the turn of the 20th century

Immigration in Argentina afterwards made the Paseo a veritable bazaar, in which Italian trattorias, French bistrots, German beer halls, and Greek restaurants operated alongside brothels and seedy bars. The increasingly commercial desirability of the street, however, prompted the city to mandate in 1875 that all buildings along it be designed with porticos, a regulation still in force and one which forced the paseo's more precarious establishments to close.

A sudden economic and population boom led the new President of Argentina, Julio Roca, to commission the development in 1881 of an ambitious port to supplement the recently developed facilities at La Boca, in Buenos Aires' southside. Approved by the Argentine Congress in 1882 and financed by the prominent London-based Barings Bank (the chief underwriter of Argentine bonds and investment, at the time), the project required the reclaiming of over 200 hectares (500 acres) of underwater land and was accompanied by the widening of the Paseo de Julio into a boulevard. These improvements were capped by the installation of a decorative fountain on the median, for which an Argentine student of Auguste Rodin's, Lola Mora, was commissioned. Unveiled in 1903, the Font of the Nereids sparked moralist outrage over its nude Venus, and the masterpiece was relocated to its present Puerto Madero site in 1918.

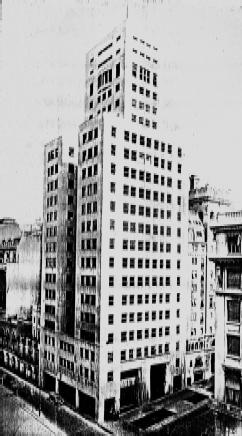
The Comega Building

The improved boulevard saw the replacement of clapboard structures for upscale office buildings, mostly influenced by French architecture, and all distinguished by their archways. Among the most notable were the head offices of the Nicolás Mihanovich Shipping Company and Bunge y Born (then Argentina's leading grain exporter) and the Buenos Aires Stock Exchange's new headquarters (1916). The election that year of longtime universal male suffrage activist and UCR leader Hipólito Yrigoyen resulted in the boulevard's renaming in honor of Leandro Alem, the founder of the centrist UCR, in a November 1919 ordinance. The UCR government completed the avenue's best-known landmark, the Buenos Aires Central Post Office, in 1928, though a 1930 coup d'état resulted in the return of conservative rule.

Changes in national politics did not rename or adversely impact the avenue, which was further widened and improved by Mayor José Guerrico in 1931, adding new medians to delimit bus and taxi lanes, and giving the boulevard its approximate current layout. The avenue's eclectic architectural selection was added to by rationalist buildings such as the Comega (1930) and the 42-story Alas (1950), which remained the tallest in Argentina until 1995. President Juan Perón, who had the Alas built, ordered the avenue's stretch north of Plaza San Martín renamed Avenida del Libertador in 1950, to commemorate the centennial of General José de San Martín's death (San Martín is known as the Liberator of Argentina and Perú). Zoning changes enacted in 1966 allowed the development of the Catalinas Norte business park at the avenue's northern end, bringing with it the International style to the avenue's cityscape. Leandro Alem remains one of the city's most valuable commercial real estate addresses, and its last undeveloped lots, municipal property totaling no more than 15,000 m^{2} (160,000 ft^{2}) and estimated to be worth around US$80 million, were publicly proposed for sale in 2009.

== Points of Interest ==
Avenida Leandro N. Alem
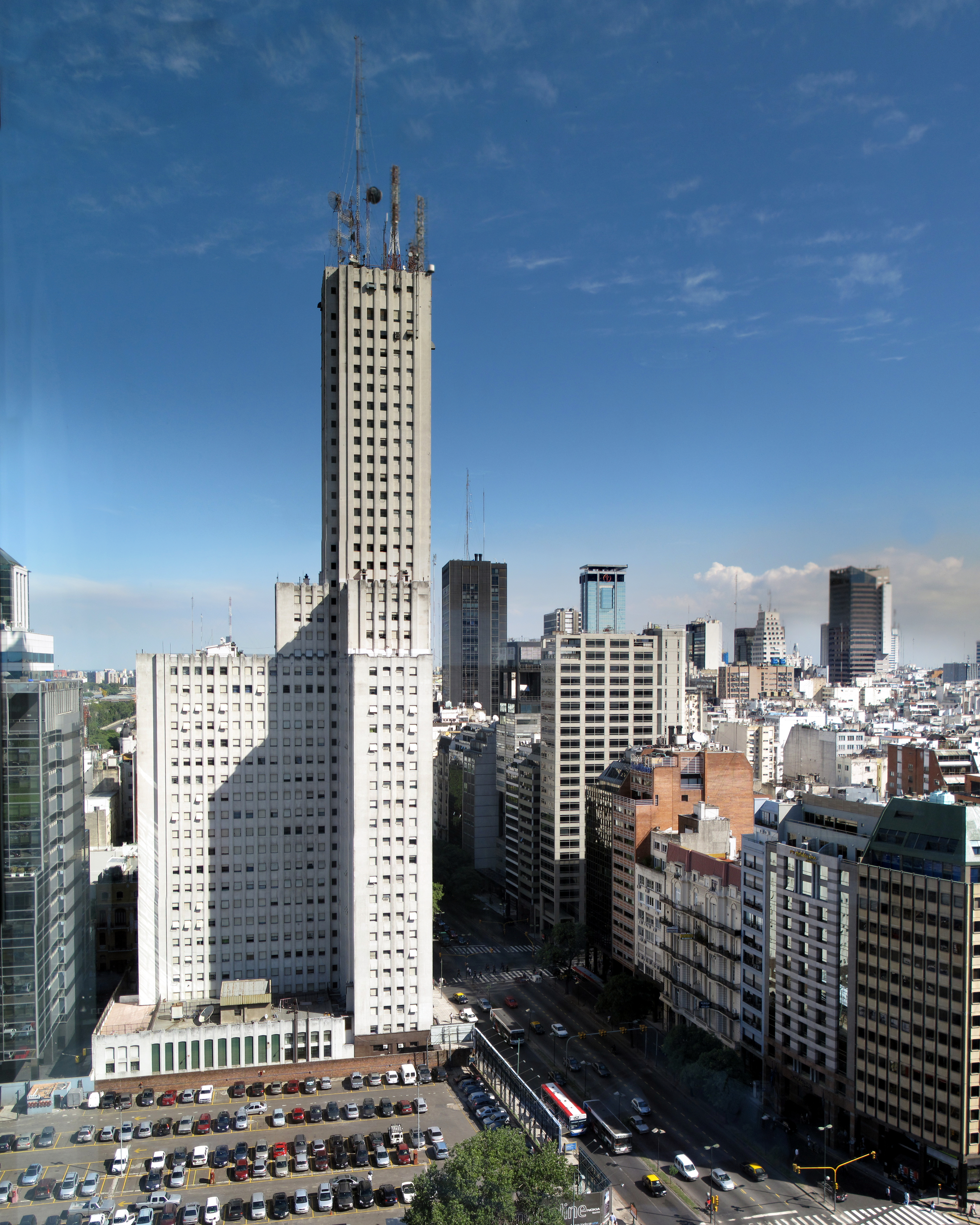
View of the avenue and the Alas Building

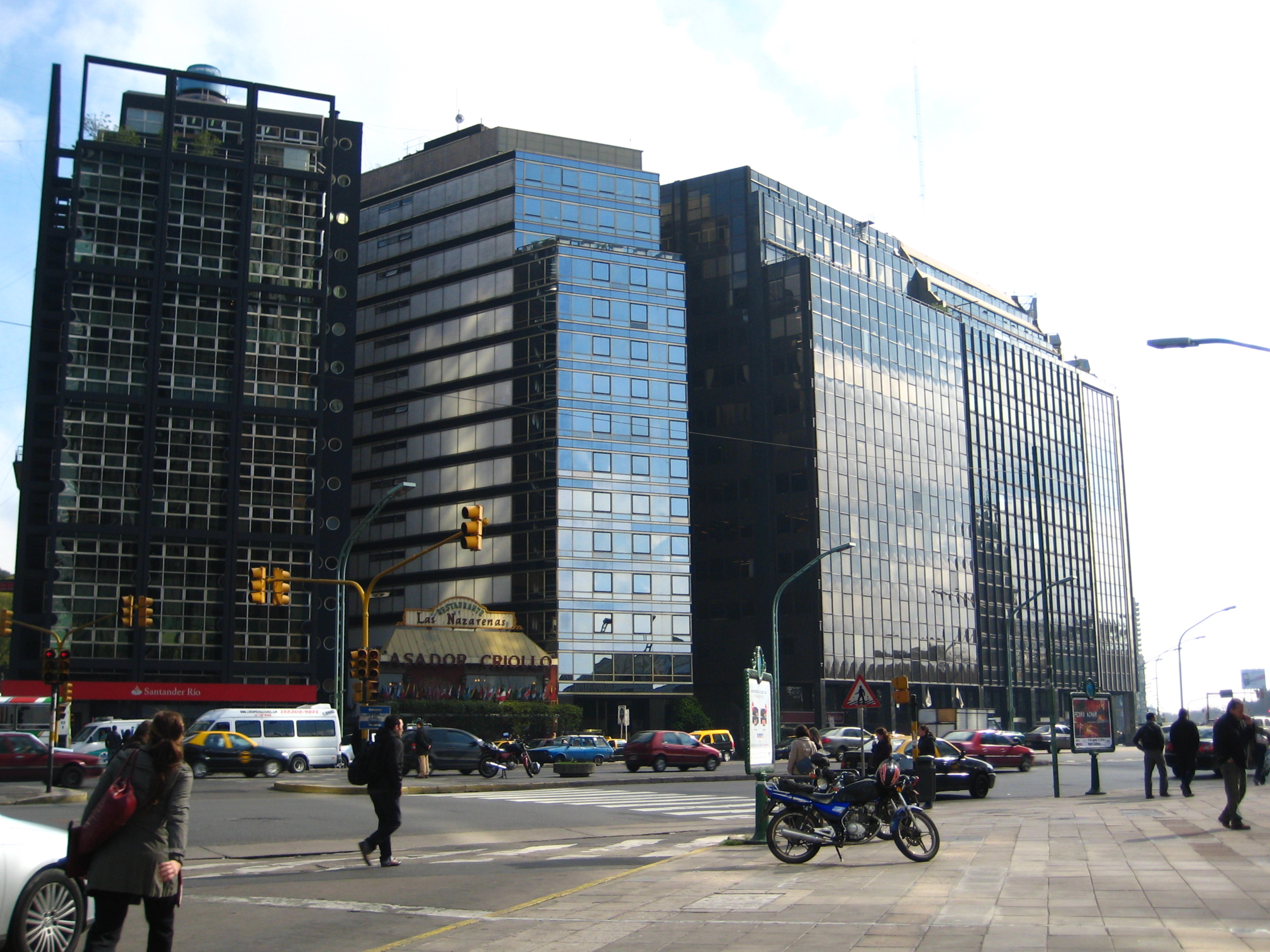
Retiro Business District

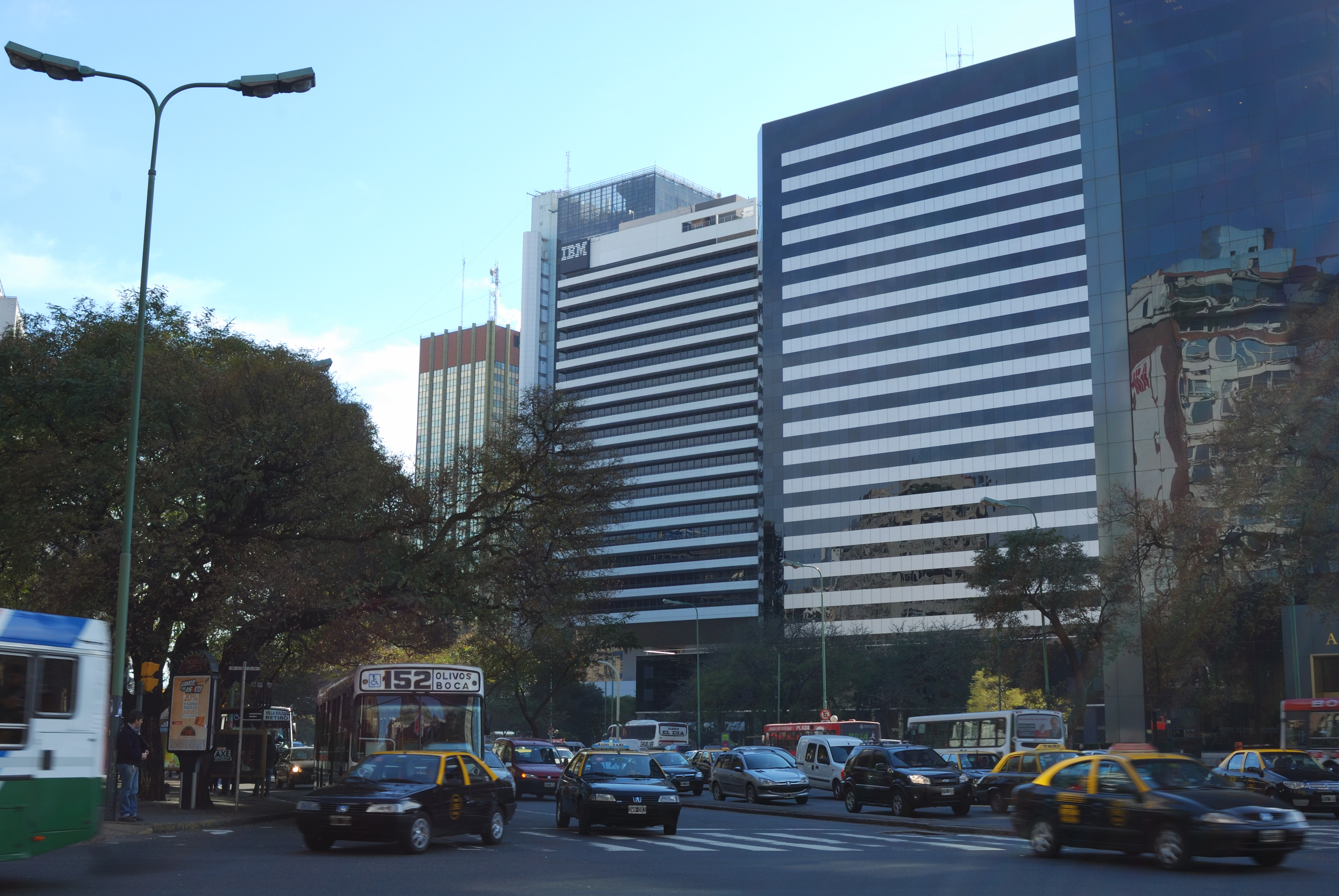
Catalinas Norte

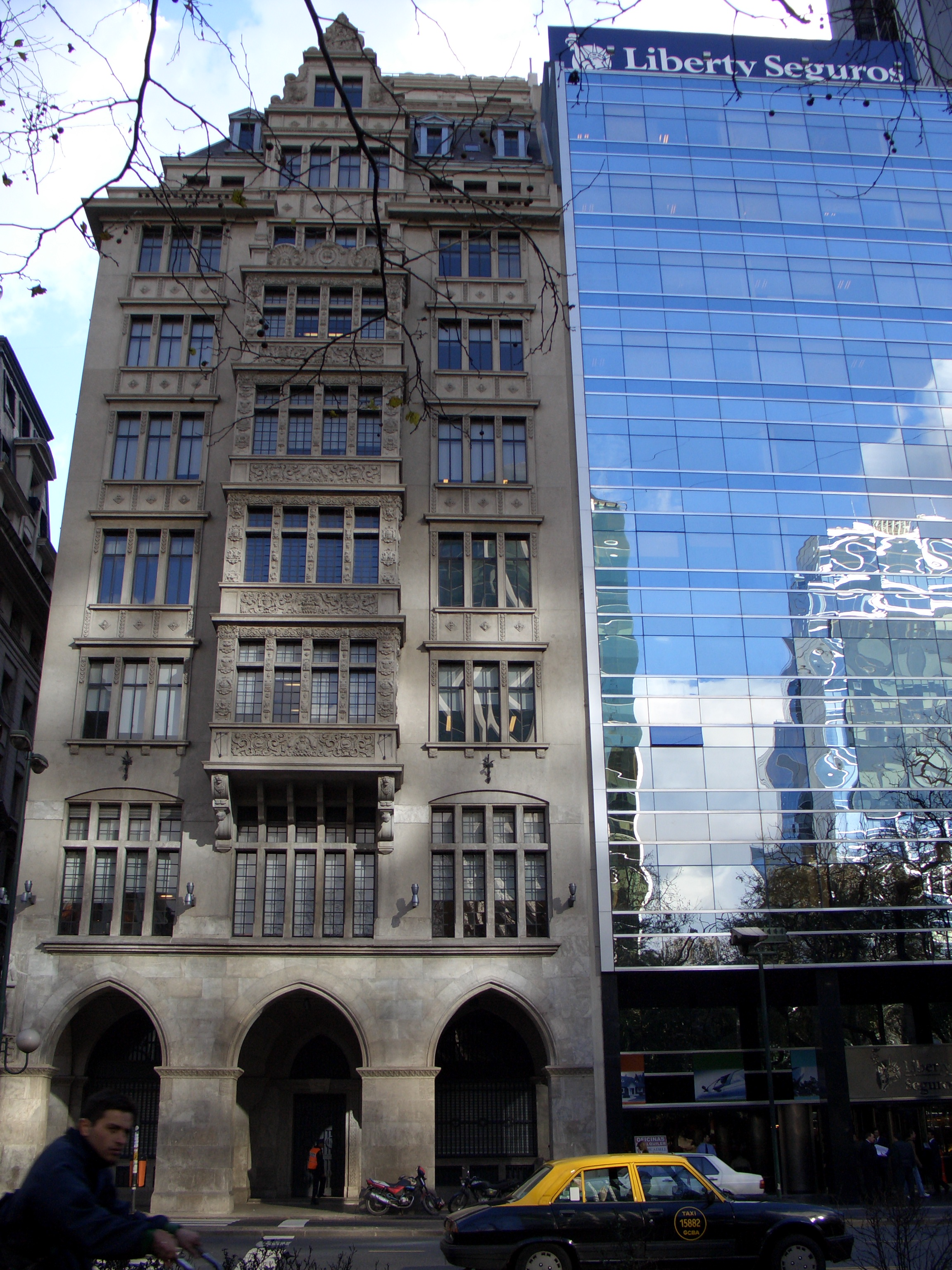
Bunge y Born headquarters

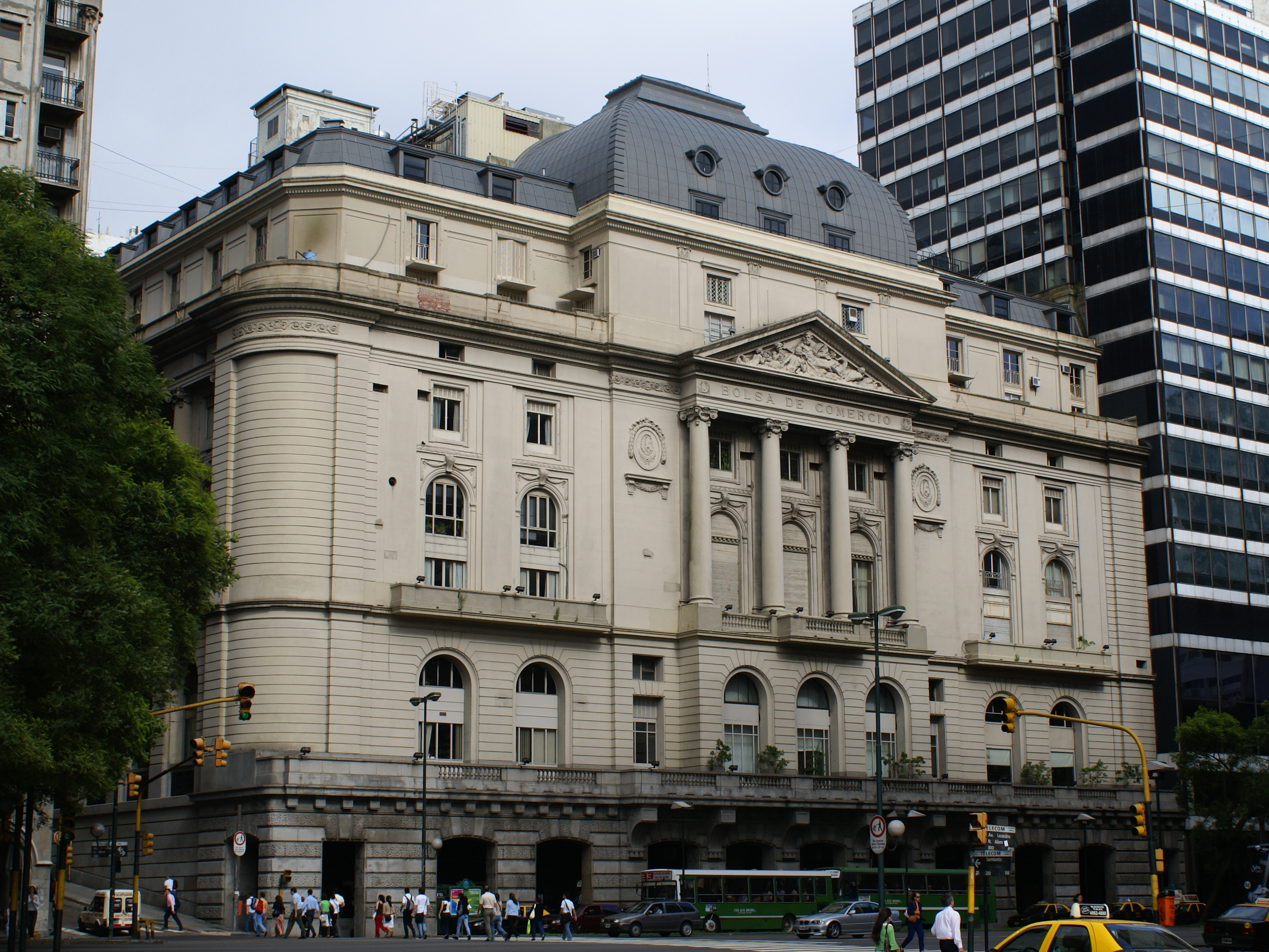
Stock Exchange

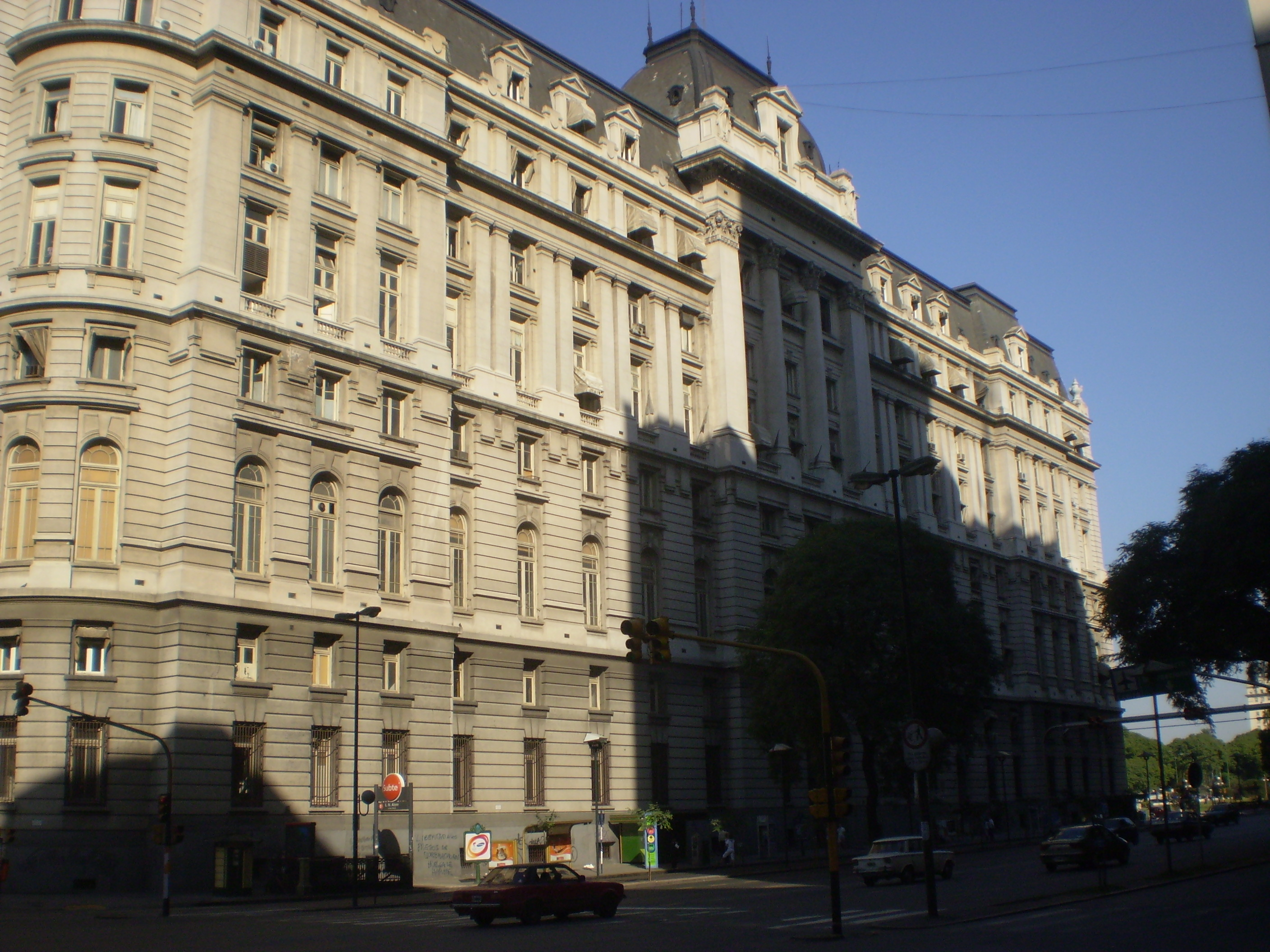
Central Post Office
