= Embassy of Argentina, Islamabad =

Embassy of Argentina, Islamabad Embajada de Argentina en Islamabad (Spanish)
- Location: Islamabad, Pakistan
- Address: House 24, Street 18, F-6/2, Islamabad
- Coordinates: 33.731717°N 73.066086°E
- Ambassador: Sebastián Sayús
- Website: epaki.cancilleria.gob.ar/en

The Embassy of Argentina in Islamabad is the diplomatic mission of Argentina to Pakistan. It is located at House 24, Street 18, F-6/2,, Islamabad. Argentina sent its first diplomat to Pakistan in January 1948. The two countries soon established full diplomatic relations and the Argentine embassy was opened in Karachi, the former capital, on 29 October 1951.

The embassy provides consular services and facilitates bilateral relations through commerce and tourism. In addition, it promotes Argentine cultural events, arts, exhibitions and musical shows in Pakistan. There is also an Argentina Park in Islamabad's G-6 area. It was inaugurated as a public landmark commemorating the two countries' relations.

The embassy is concurrently accredited as Argentina's mission to Afghanistan and Tajikistan. The present Argentine ambassador to Pakistan is H.E. Sebastián Sayús, appointed in 15th of July 2024.
