= List of ambassadors of Argentina to Pakistan =

This is a list of ambassadors of Argentina to Pakistan. The present ambassador is Leopoldo Francisco Sahores. The ambassador is based at the Argentine embassy in Islamabad and is concurrently accredited as a non-resident ambassador to Afghanistan and Tajikistan.

== List of ambassadors ==
The following is a partial list of Argentine ambassadors to Pakistan:

- M. Alberto M. Soria (1948) (Note: Appointed as a consul officer in Karachi.)
- Paul Desmaras Lazurtiaga (1981–1984)
- Silvio H. Neuman (1992)
- Rodolfo J. Martin-Saravia (2004–2016)
- Ivan Ivanissevich (2016–2019)
- Leopoldo Francisco Sahores (2021–2023)
- Sebastián SAYÚS (2024–Current)
