= Estrugamou Building =

Residential building of architectural importance, Buenos Aires

- Palacio Estrugamou
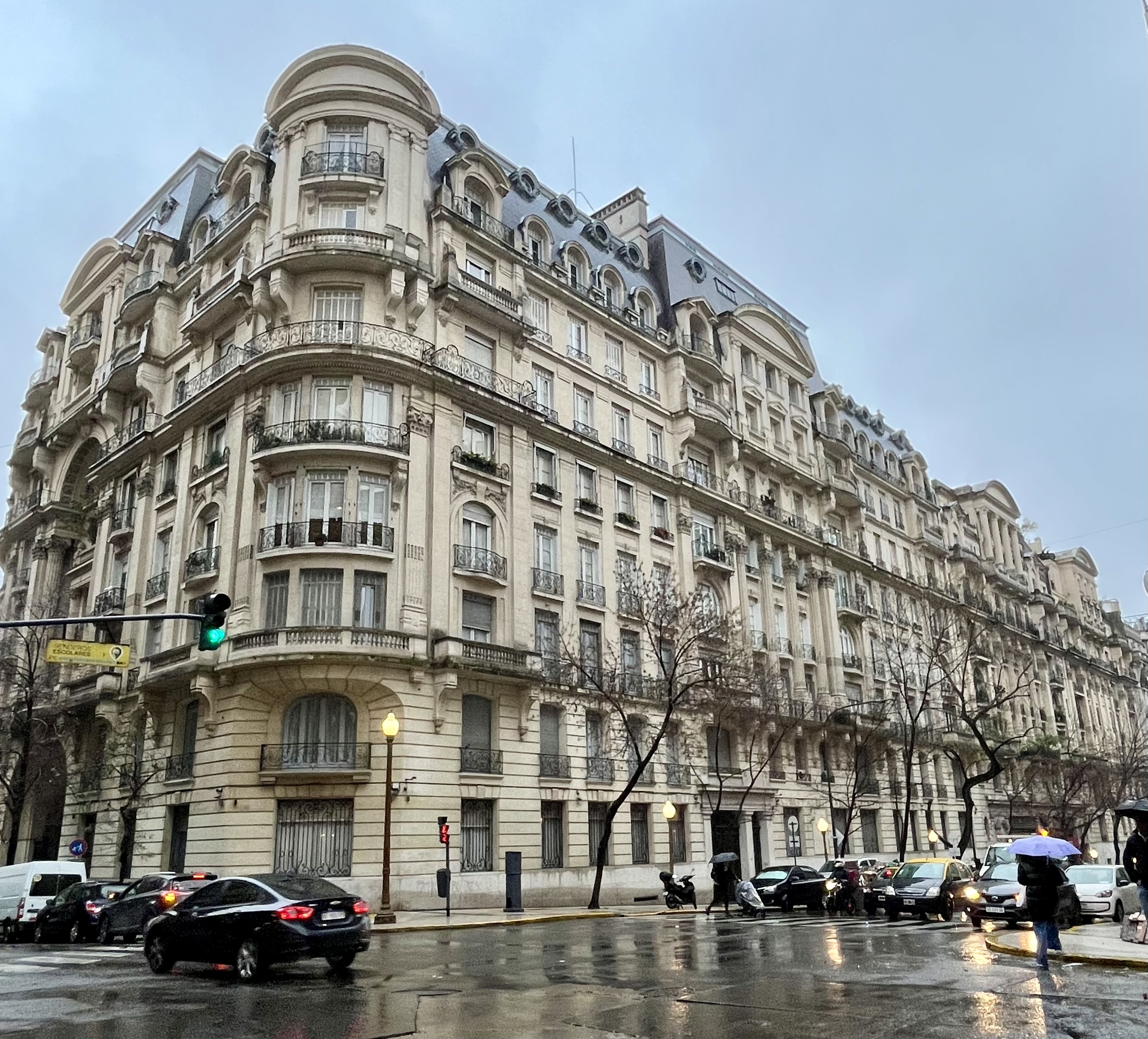
- View of the building from the intersection of Juncal and Esmeralda streets, 2024.

- Location within Buenos Aires Location within Buenos Aires Province Location within Argentina

General information
- Architectural style: Second Empire architecture
- Location: Retiro, 1319 Esmeralda, Buenos Aires, Argentina
- Coordinates: 34°35′S 58°22′W
- Current tenants: Naela Chohan
- Groundbreaking: 1924
- Completed: 1929
- Inaugurated: 1929
- Client: Alejandro Estrugamou

Technical details
- Floor count: 8
- Lifts/elevators: 4

Design and construction
- Architect: Eduardo Sauze y August Huguier
- Designations: Replica of the Winged Victory of Samothrace

The Estrugamou Building is an architecturally significant residential building in the Retiro area of Buenos Aires.

== Overview ==
The landmark building was commissioned in 1924 by Alejandro Estrugamou, the son of immigrants from the Basses-Pyrénées area of France and a prominent Venado Tuerto (Santa Fe Province) landowner. Conceiving it as an investment property, Estrugamou himself lived in a relatively understated French Baroque mansion, nearby.

Designed by architects Eduardo Sauze y August Huguier, the building, like many of the upscale developments in Argentina during the early 20th century, was designed in an eclectic style heavily influenced by French Baroque and Second Empire architecture. The Estrugamou was built in four sections, arranged around a patio adorned with a bronze copy of the iconic Winged Victory of Samothrace. Nearly every decorative element of the building was imported from France, and the flooring was finished in Slavonian oak.

Inaugurated in 1929, the eight-story Estrugamou Building was one of the few city landmarks to receive no architectural awards at the time of its completion. It was graced by an oversized sidewalk and extensive garden along its southern façade originally, though the civic-minded Alejandro Estrugamou donated this section to the city (which sought to widen Juncal Street) shortly before his death in 1937. The Estrugamou building has been described as an 'oasis of glamour, diplomacy and politics' by virtue of its notable residents and associated personalities.

== Residents and Associated Personalities ==
- Domingo Cavallo
- Carlos Gardel
- Naela Chohan
- Jorge Lanata
- Marcelo Torcuato de Alvear
- Regina Pacini
