= Comega Building =

Skyscraper in Buenos Aires, Argentina

Coordinates: 34.6033°S 58.3706°W

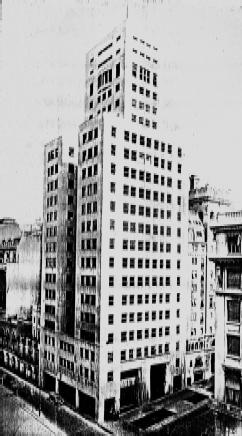
- The building just after completion in 1933

General information
- Completed: 1933

Height
- Height: 88 metres (289 ft)

Technical details
- Floor count: 21

Design and construction
- Architects: Alfred Joselevich and Enrique Douillet
- Structural engineer: Alberto Stein

The Comega Building is located on 222 Avenida Corrientes in the corner of Alem Avenue, in the city of Buenos Aires, Argentina.

== History ==
The Comega Building was the first reinforced concrete skyscraper built in Argentina and the first in Buenos Aires to show an exterior fully lined with travertine. It was built, in rationalist style, between 1921 and 1934 on a project by Ing. Alberto Stein and architects Enrique Douillet and Alfredo Joselevich. When first built it rivaled another architectural giant, the SAFICO Building, also built in rationalist style just 200 meters to its west on Avenida Corrientes. However, in 1936 the Kavanagh Building greatly surpassed both buildings in height.

It was built for Compañía Mercantil y Ganadera S.A. (COMEGA), in a privileged area which previously had occupied the residence of Francisco Madero, then transformed into Grand National Hotel.

At the time of its opening the 19th floor was planned for collective use and assembly, but the place was soon allocated for the renowned confitería-restaurante (café) "Comega Club", which ran until 1969. That place was specially prepared for major events that could be seen from a height, such as the arrival of the dirigible Graf Zeppelin in 1934, Carlos Gardel's funeral in February 1936, and the final extension of the Avenida Corrientes in 1937. A new restaurant opened on the same site in 2000, followed by the Restaurant-Café "A222 " from 2004 until its closure in early 2012.

A notable feature of the building was its five elevators, these being the first high-speed lifts of Buenos Aires, capable of climbing 180 meters per minute. there was also a hair salon in one of its levels, for the use of its office occupants.

A declared architectural heritage of the city, the building has recently been renovated with much of its original features restored.

== Description ==
Since its opening, one of the great attractions of the Comega Building was its strategic location, at the corner of Avenida Corrientes and Avenida Leandro N. Alem, near the Stock Exchange, the Casa Rosada and other public offices, and headquarters of major exporters.

From the building one can see, among other things, the neighborhood of Puerto Madero, the Ecological Reserve, the Rio de la Plata, and much further away, the silhouette of the city of Colonia (Uruguay), and some buildings in the city of Quilmes.

Its exterior has straight edges and is devoid of ornaments. It consists of two wings and a higher multi-storey central tower of 21 floors and 88 meters high. Together they surround a central open courtyard, facing Avenida Leandro N. Alem. It also has two levels of underground garage.

Its interior features granite cladding and stainless steel counters, which were considered extremely novel and expensive features for its time.
