= Naela Chohan =

Ambassador of Pakistan, feminist artist (born 1958)

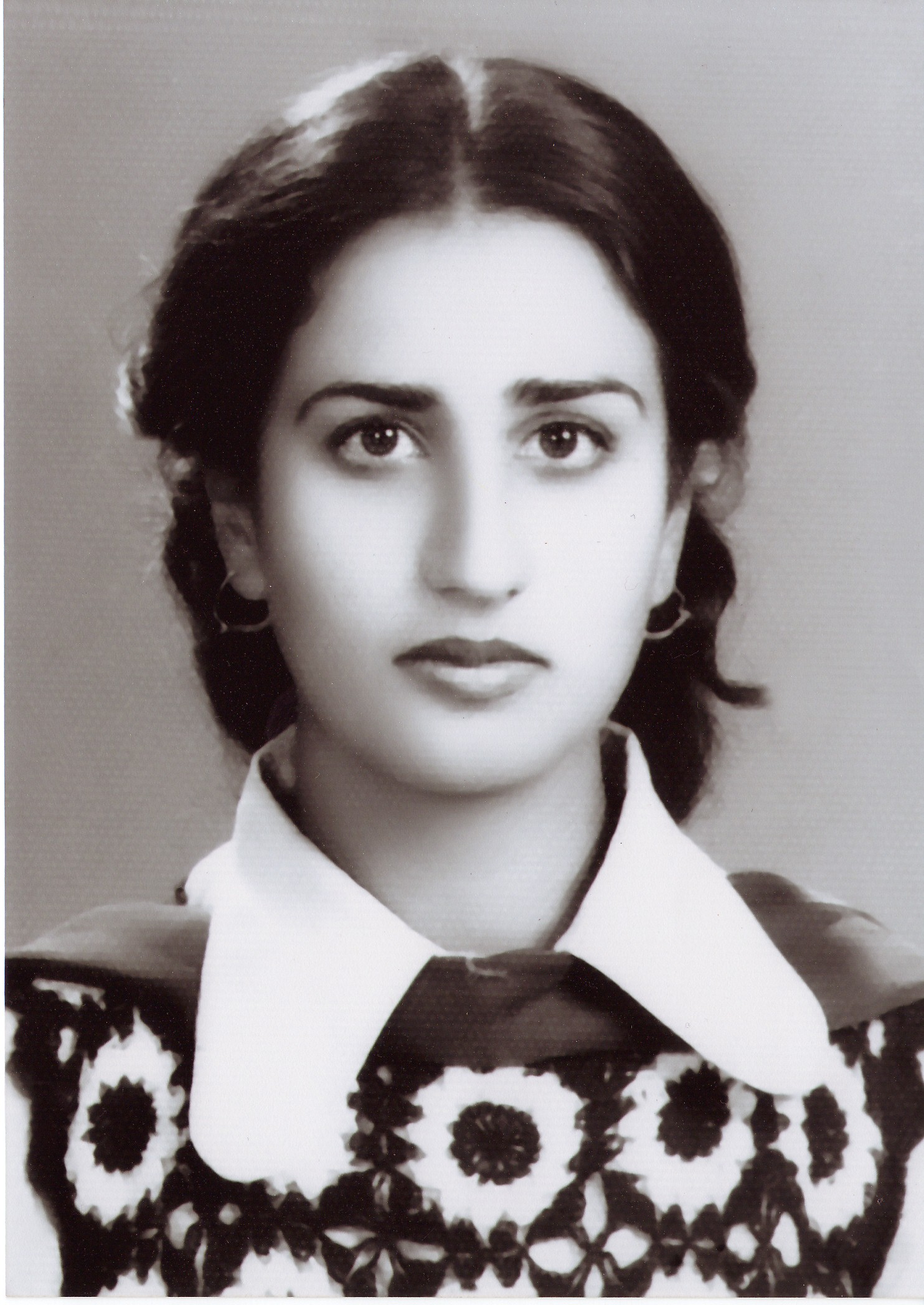
- Chohan in 1982

Pakistan Ambassador to Australia
- In office 29 October 2014 – 5 May 2018

Pakistan Ambassador to Argentina
- In office 26 August 2009 – 29 April 2013

Personal details
- Born: 6 May 1958 (age 68) Rawalpindi, Pakistan
- Spouse: Musa Javed Chohan
- Children: 2
- Education: Harvard University, Centre d'Etudes Diplomatiques et Stratégiques, Quaid-e-Azam University, École du Louvre, École nationale supérieure des Beaux-Arts
- Occupation: Diplomat, women's rights advocate, artist

Naela Chohan (Urdu: نائلہ چوہان, alternative spelling Naila Chohan) (born 6 May 1958) is a Pakistani artist and diplomat. As a seasoned and veteran diplomat, ambassador Chohan has assumed a leadership position in eight different Pakistani diplomatic missions on five different continents. Naela Chohan is a hyperpolyglot with demonstrable fluency in seven Indo-European languages including Persian, French, and Spanish.

Along with only a handful of other diplomats, Naela Chohan represents the first and senior-most cohort of women to rise to the highest echelon of Pakistan's Ministry of Foreign Affairs. Canada's weekly foreign policy Embassy Magazine in January, 2008 described her by saying that "though slight in stature and soft in speech, Naela Chohan accounts for 50 per cent of the Pakistani foreign service's most potent power couple." Having started her diplomatic career on the China Desk at Pakistan's Ministry of Foreign Affairs, she has been a proponent of a strong Pakistan-China Alliance premised on multifaceted cooperation. Naela Chohan is also committed to the prohibition of global Chemical Weapons, being the first civilian and woman to head the National Authority on the Implementation of the Convention on the Prohibition of Chemical weapons in Pakistan. She is responsible for having conceived or restored several Pakistani landmarks including the Plaza de Pakistan in Buenos Aires, Argentina. She was the first female foreign diplomat to be received in Tehran by the Iranian government after the 1979 Revolution.

Naela Chohan has served as High Commissioner of Pakistan to Australia, where she laid emphasis on bolstering bilateral ties, therein prioritizing the enhancement of security, agricultural, educational and economic relations. She has previously served as Pakistan's Secretary for the Middle East and Africa, prior to which she was the Ambassador of Pakistan to Argentina, Uruguay, Peru and Ecuador, where she has been a vocal proponent of stronger ties between Pakistan and Latin America. She is an alumnus of Quaid-e-Azam University and Harvard Kennedy School at Harvard University.

Beyond her diplomatic career, Ambassador Naela Chohan is a strong advocate of Women's Rights through the medium of visual arts, including subjects of pertinence to the social condition of women. Exhibitions of her art have taken place on five continents and have garnered the accolades of civil society as well as heads of state. Her most notable work is Souffrance, which is kept on permanent display at the UNESCO headquarters in Paris since 2002.

== Career ==
Born in Rawalpindi, Pakistan, Chohan has served as ambassador of Pakistan to Australia, where she laid emphasis on bolstering bilateral ties, therein prioritizing the enhancement of security, agricultural, educational and economic relations. She assumed this office on 29 October 2014 at Government House, Canberra. In this capacity, she is also accredited to Pacific nations including Fiji, Papua New Guinea, The Solomon Islands, and Vanuatu, among others. In April, 2018, she inaugurated the Consulate General of Pakistan in Melbourne. Having started her diplomatic career on the China Desk at Pakistan's Ministry of Foreign Affairs, she has been a proponent of a strong Pakistan-China Alliance premised on multifaceted cooperation.

Along with only a handful of other diplomats, Naela Chohan represents the first and senior-most cohort of women to rise to the highest echelon of Pakistan's Ministry of Foreign Affairs. She has the honour as a woman of being the first female foreign diplomat to be received in Tehran by the Iranian government after the 1979 Revolution. Canada's weekly foreign policy Embassy Magazine in January, 2008 described her by saying that "though slight in stature and soft in speech, Naela Chohan accounts for 50 per cent of the Pakistani foreign service's most potent power couple."

As a seasoned and veteran diplomat of Pakistan, Naela Chohan has completed eight different diplomatic missions on five different continents. Naela Chohan's diplomatic assignments have included Additional Secretary (AS) Middle East and Africa, the High Commission of Pakistan in Ottawa, the Pakistan delegation to United Nations General Assembly 41st (1987) Session and 42nd (1988) Session, and the Embassy of Pakistan in Tehran (1989–1993), and Kuala Lumpur (1997–2001). Naela Chohan is also committed to the prohibition of global Chemical Weapons, being the first civilian and woman to head the National Authority on the Implementation of the Convention on the Prohibition of Chemical weapons in Pakistan. In addition to her service as a career diplomat, she has been a member of the Board of Directors of the Overseas Employment Corporation of Pakistan and the Inter State Gas System Limited (Pvt); and a member of the Central Board of Film Censors(CBFC). She was also unanimously elected Chairperson of the Asia Pacific Development Center (APDC), Kuala Lumpur (1998–2000). Ambassador Chohan has been designated a Profesora Visitante at the School of Oriental Studies (Escuela de los Estudios Orientales) at the Universidad del Salvador.

In April 2014, Naela Chohan assumed the position of Acting Foreign Secretary (A-FS) at the Pakistan Ministry of Foreign Affairs, thereby becoming the first female Foreign Service Officer to hold this office. She subsequently reassumed this office in July, 2014. In 2016, Madam Ambassador Chohan was the first Pakistani ever to set foot on the Solomon Islands, and established formal diplomatic relations between Pakistan and The Solomon Islands.

== Art and advocacy for women's rights ==
Alongside her diplomatic career, Ambassador Naela Chohan is a strong advocate of women's rights through the medium of visual arts, and her work Souffrance is on permanent display at the UNESCO headquarters in Paris and was inaugurated by Boutros Boutros Ghali on the UN International Women's Day, 2002. The UNESCO Bureau of Strategic Planning Section for Women and Gender Equality described her work as "a reflection on the position of women in society, illiteracy, economic empowerment, women's contribution to society and discrimination they face". Her work Enlightenment (1999) is on permanent display at the Museum of Islamic Heritage, Kuala Lumpur; a piece that was inaugurated by the First Lady Datin Sri Endon Mahmood of Malaysia. Other major displays and exhibitions of her work have taken place in Paris (2002), Buenos Aires (2011), and in Ottawa (2008) where her exposition was inaugurated by First Lady of Canada Mrs. Laureen Harper. Her exhibition at the National Art Gallery, Pakistan titled Art from the Heart was inaugurated by the First Lady of Pakistan Samina Alvi, and its focus was on the conditions of women and on countering hostile stereotypes and narratives.

== Education ==
Naela Chohan holds a master's degree in International Relations from Quaid-e-Azam University (1982), and a PhD session certificate in International Relations from Centre d'Etudes Diplomatiques et Stratégiques in Paris (2002). She also received training at École nationale supérieure des Beaux-Arts and the École du Louvre in Paris (2001). Naela Chohan also undertook the Executive Development Program (EDP) from Harvard Kennedy School at Harvard University (2006). As a hyperpolyglot, she has demonstrated fluency in seven Indo-European languages including English, French, Bengali, Punjabi, Urdu, Persian (acquired at age 35), and Spanish (acquired at age 51).

== Family ==
Ambassador Naela Chohan is married to Ambassador Musa Javed Chohan, who has served as Pakistan's Ambassador to France (2001), Permanent Representative to UNESCO (2001), and High Commissioner to Canada (2007) and Malaysia (1997). She has two children, Usman W. Chohan and Ibrahim A. Chohan.

== See also ==
- Australia-Pakistan relations
- Argentina-Pakistan relations
- Plaza de Pakistan
- Estrugamou Building
