= Avenida del Libertador (Buenos Aires) =

Street in Buenos Aires, Argentina

Coordinates: 34°34′55″S 58°24′06″W

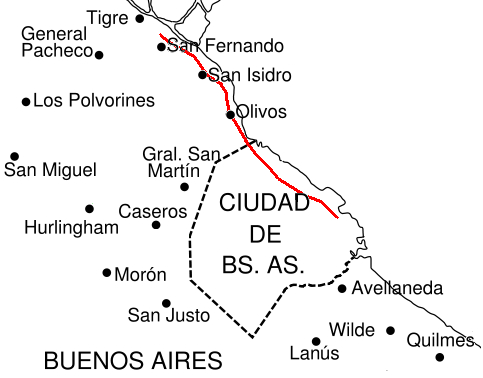
Approximate route

Avenida del Libertador is one of the principal thoroughfares in Buenos Aires, Argentina, and in points north, extending 25 km (16 mi) from the Retiro District of Buenos Aires (where it continues as Avenida Leandro N. Alem) to the northern suburb of San Fernando.

== History ==
Inspired by Parisian urbanist Baron Haussmann's renowned modernization of the City of Lights, Mayor Torcuato de Alvear took office with a similar mandate in 1880. Inheriting a rapidly growing city hamstrung by a typically colonial grid of narrow streets, his most ambitious project would be a boulevard connecting the Retiro section (north of downtown) to the growing neighborhoods of Recoleta and Palermo to the northeast (at the time merely suburbs). Bella Vista Street was widened and lengthened, reaching 7 km (4.3 mi) northwest into Palermo and, upon its inaugural in 1885, was renamed in honor the Mayor's father, Carlos María de Alvear (one of Argentina's early leaders).

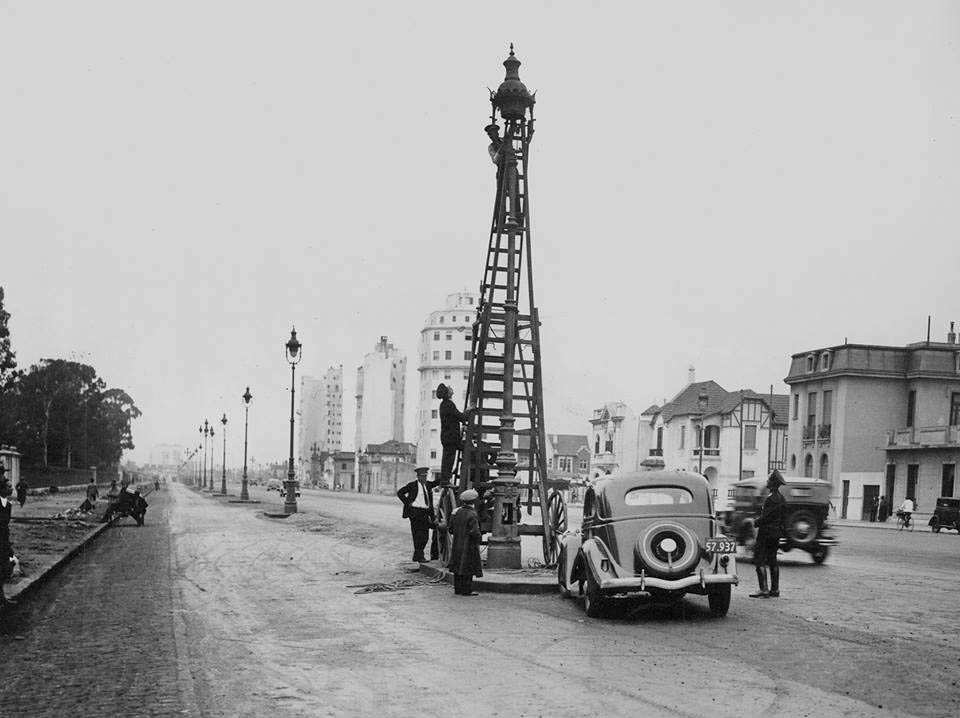
The avenue in 1936

Soon becoming among the most coveted addresses in Buenos Aires, Avenida Alvear was graced by numerous mansions (a few of which survive), though it quickly also became among the most transited in the fast-growing Buenos Aires of the late 19th century. Planned with a future railway terminal in Retiro in mind, Mayor Adolfo Bullrich had a multilane boulevard developed between Retiro and Palermo, roughly parallel to the Mitre rail line and east of Alvear Avenue, giving Palermo commuters easy access to the station and freeing Alvear of its heavy traffic.

Opened in 1906, Avenida Viceroy Vértiz was renamed Avenida del Libertador in 1950 in honor of the Liberator of Argentina, Chile and Perú, General José de San Martín, by order of President Juan Perón and to commemorate the hundredth anniversary of San Martín's passing. A 15 km (9.3 mi) thoroughfare (Route 195) connecting Buenos Aires to San Fernando was built in the late 1930s and was likewise renamed in 1950. The subsequent automobile boom and the growth of northside neighborhoods and suburbs led Mayor Manuel Iricíbar in 1968 to order the extension of the avenue northwards into the Belgrano and Núñez neighborhoods. The extension was facilitated by a tunnel and by the widening of Blandengues Street, which became part of Avenida del Libertador. Thus connected to the avenue of the same name north of Buenos Aires, Libertador's entry into the suburb of Vicente López via a roundabout was replaced by a freeway underpass and its boulevard medians, removed. Severe rush hour traffic congestion along the avenue was alleviated by the 1996 opening of the Arturo Illia Freeway, running parallel to the avenue and providing a (toll road) alternative to the busy junction at Libertador and Avenida 9 de Julio.

== Itinerary ==
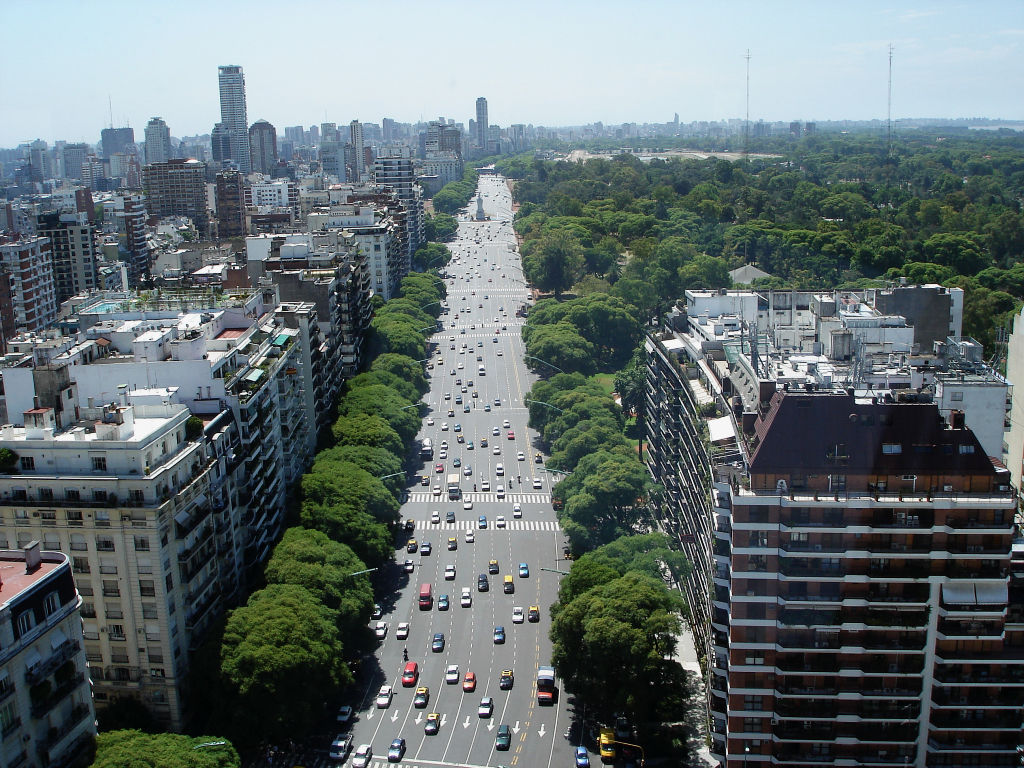
View of the avenue from a high-rise in the Palermo section of Buenos Aires

Avenida Leandro Alem at its northern end becomes Libertador Avenue at the southeast corner of San Martín Plaza. Continuing northwards along the Retiro district, it passes by the important Retiro railway terminal and in parallel to the Mitre rail line. Past the Railway Museum, it travels under the Illia Freeway overpass and through the intersection with the massive Ninth of July Avenue. Entering the Recoleta district, the avenue affords a view of Alvear Plaza and the Recoleta Cultural Center before a fork leads to Figueroa Alcorta Avenue, a parallel thoroughfare opened in 1910. The National Museum of Fine Arts is located at this junction. Its Palermo district stretch takes the avenue past the Argentine Automobile Club, the National Museum of Decorative Arts, the Buenos Aires Japanese Gardens, Tres de Febrero Park, and the Palermo Hippodrome. Its route along both these neighborhoods is surrounded by some of the most valuable residential real estate in Buenos Aires.

A tunnel opened in 1971 takes the avenue past the Municipal Golf Course and into the Belgrano district. In Núñez, it passes by the infamous Navy Mechanics School, which housed the most important of the 340 detention centers operated by Argentina's last dictatorship in the late 1970s. The ESMA is today the National Museum of Remembrance. An underpass then leads into the northern suburb of Vicente López, beginning the avenue's 15 km (9 mi) stretch in Buenos Aires Province. The scenery of high rises and shopping areas there and in neighboring Olivos gradually blends into leafy San Isidro, passing by the Neogothic Cathedral of San Isidro. A detour via Primera Junta Avenue continues the interrupted thoroughfare into San Fernando until its city limit with the Paraná Delta city of Tigre, where it ends past a bridge over one of the area's numerous canals.

Landmarks along Avenida del Libertador
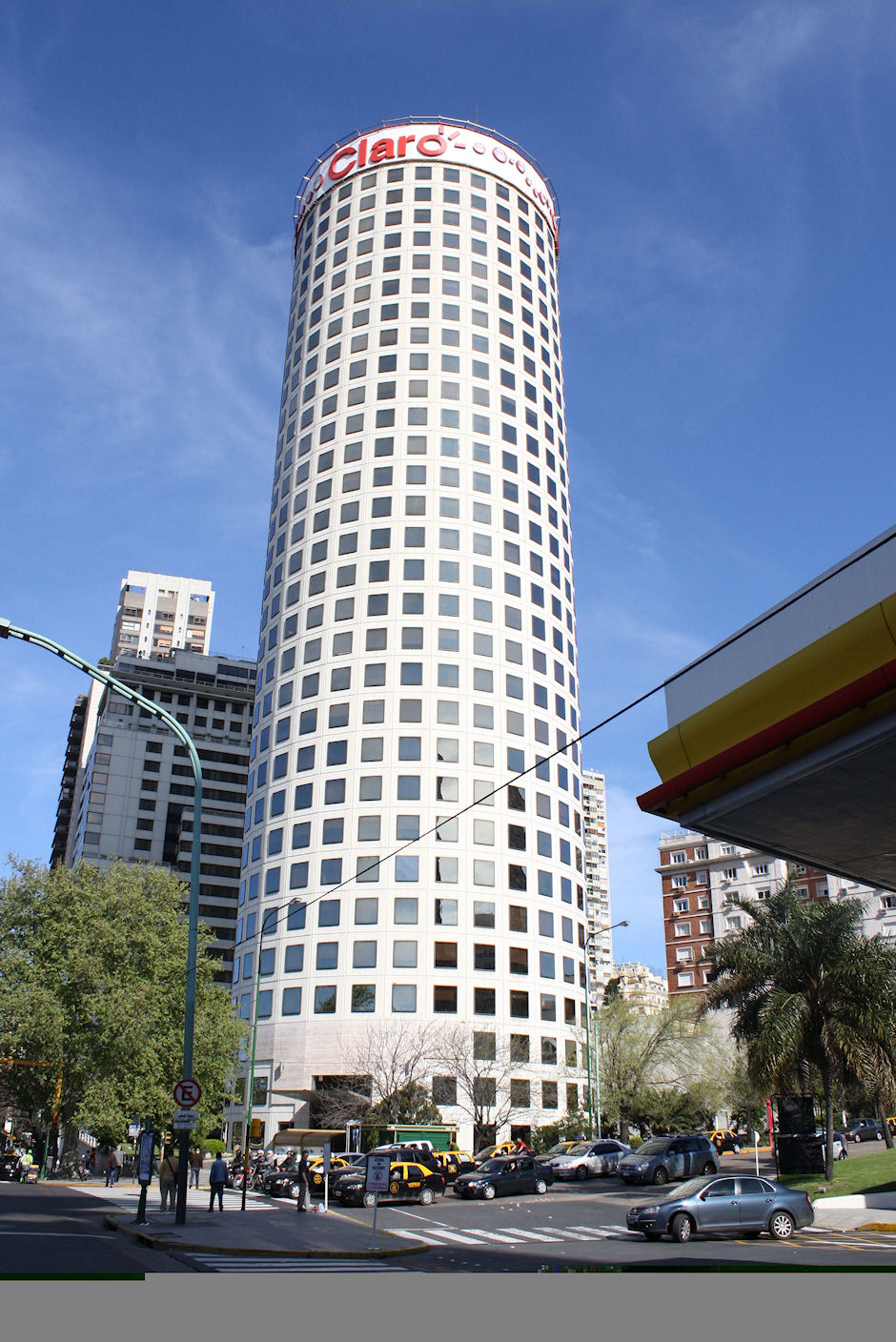
Prourban tower

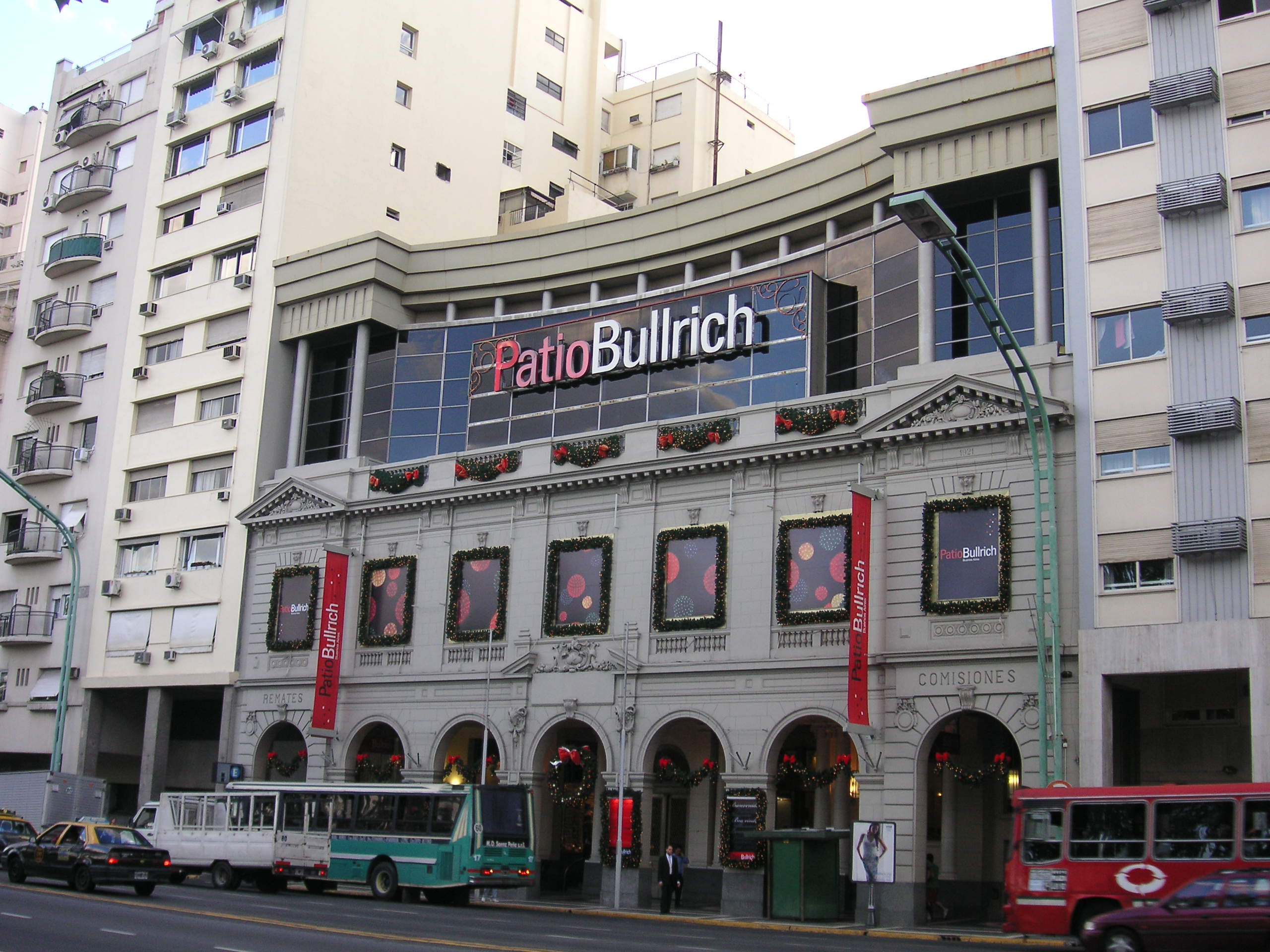
Patio Bullrich

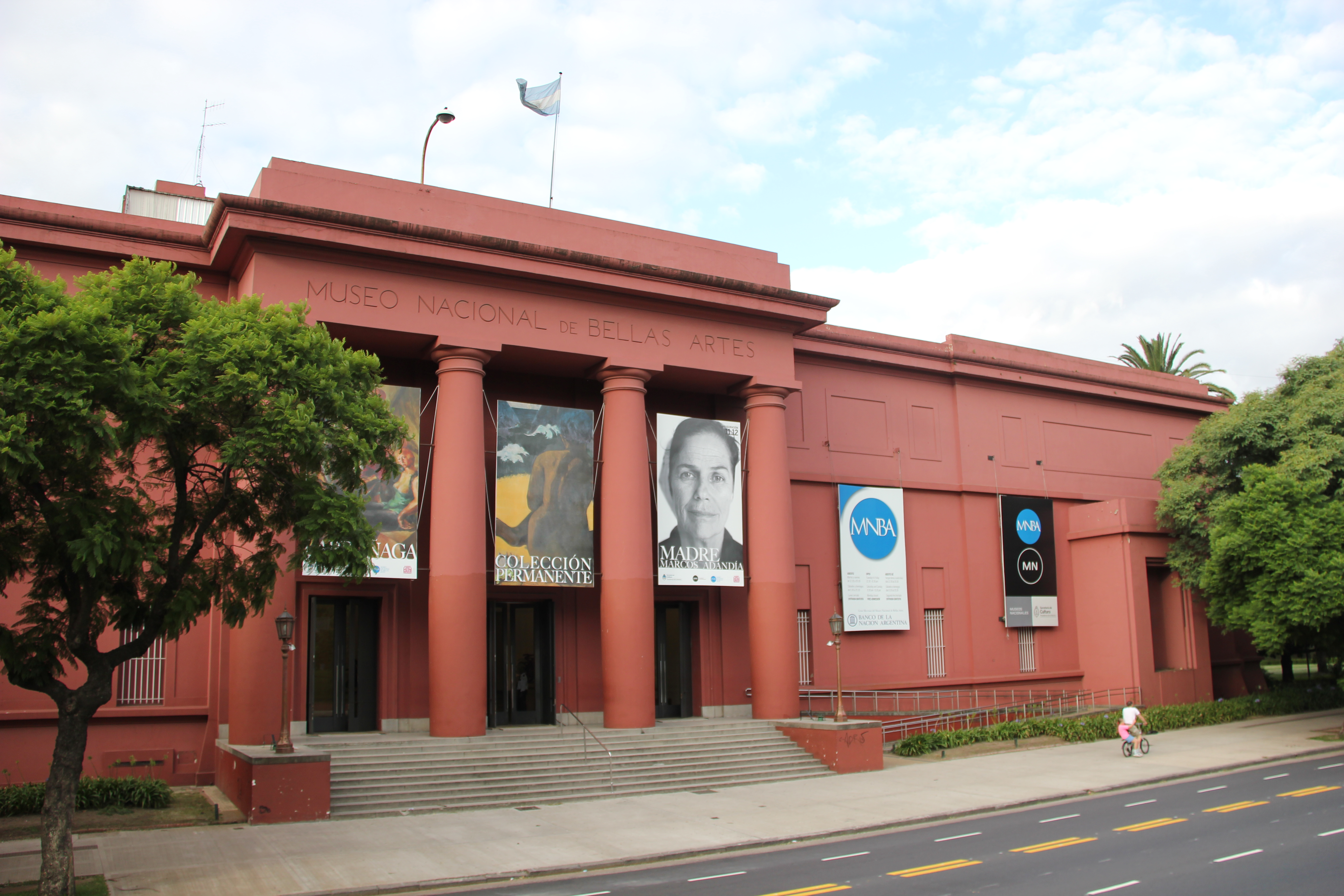
National Museum of Fine Arts

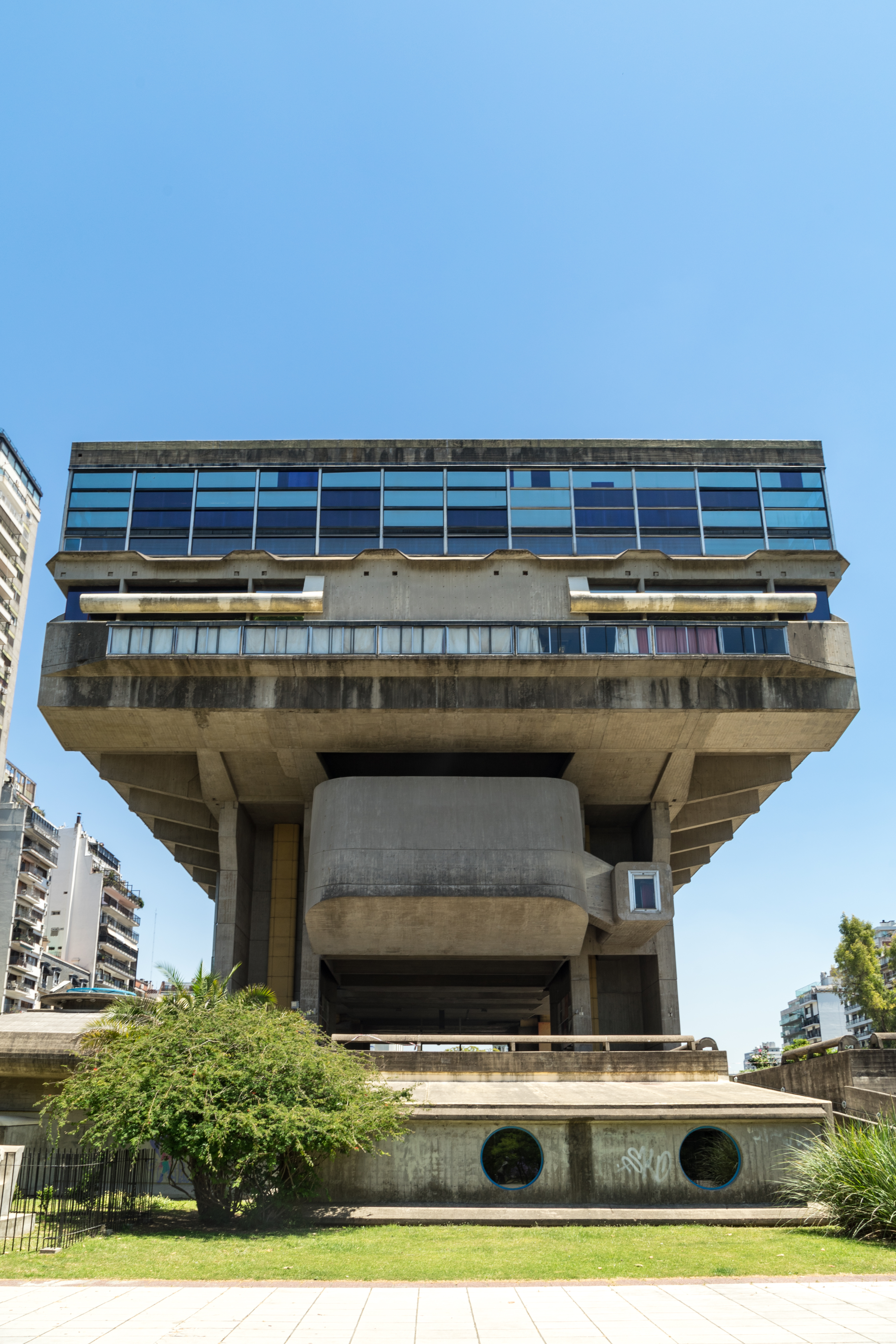
National Library

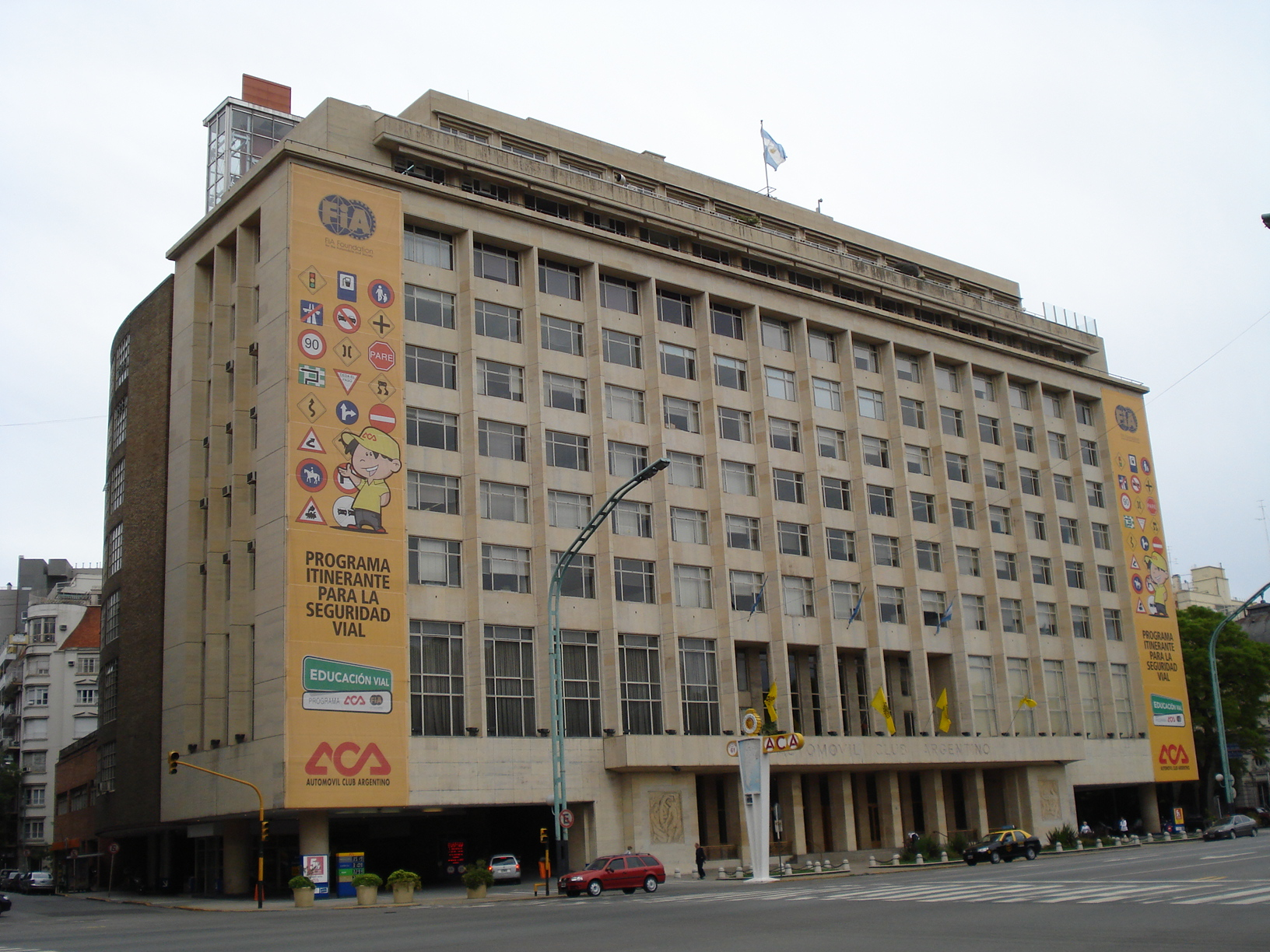
Argentine Automobile Club building

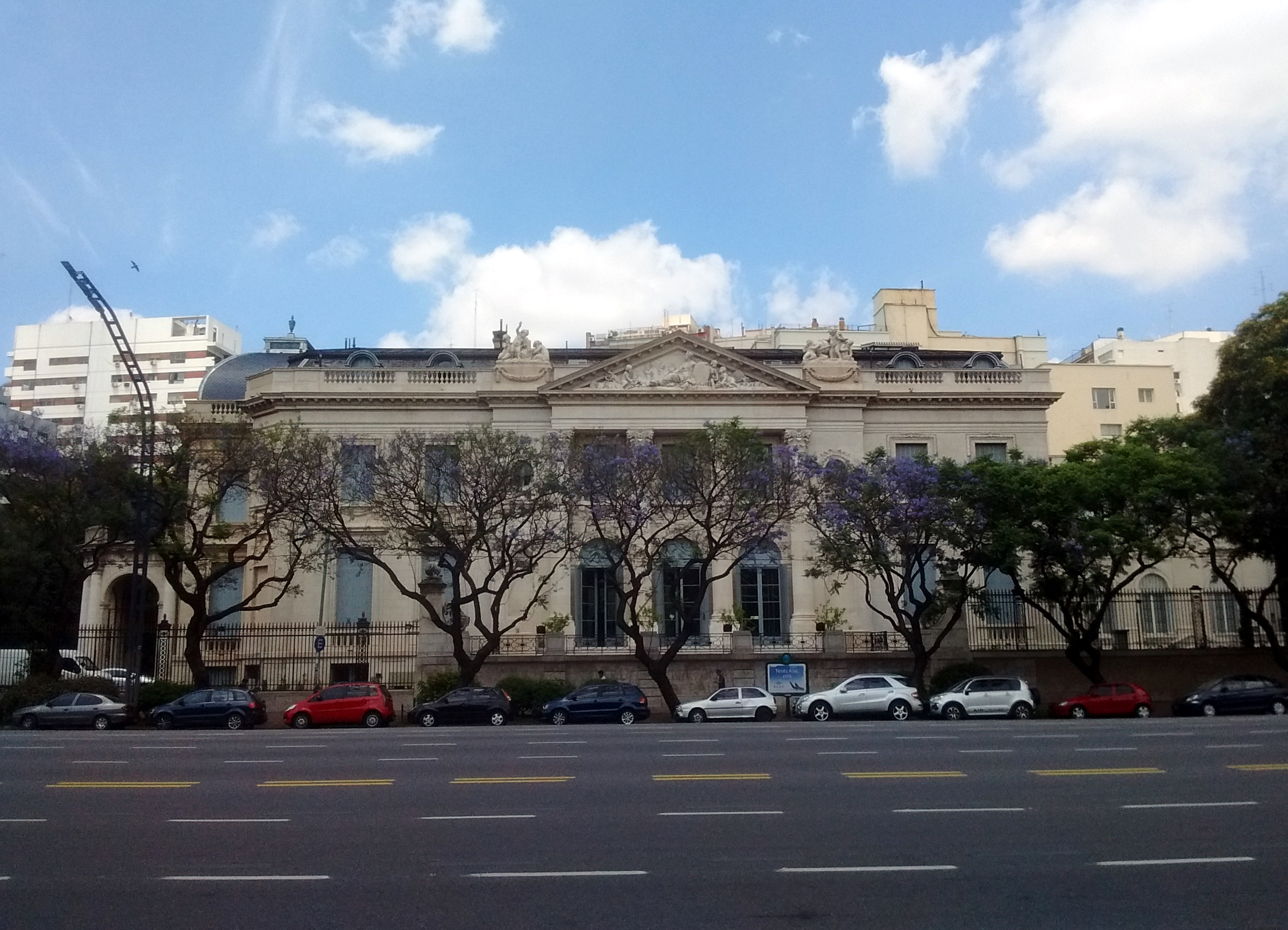
National Museum of Decorative Arts

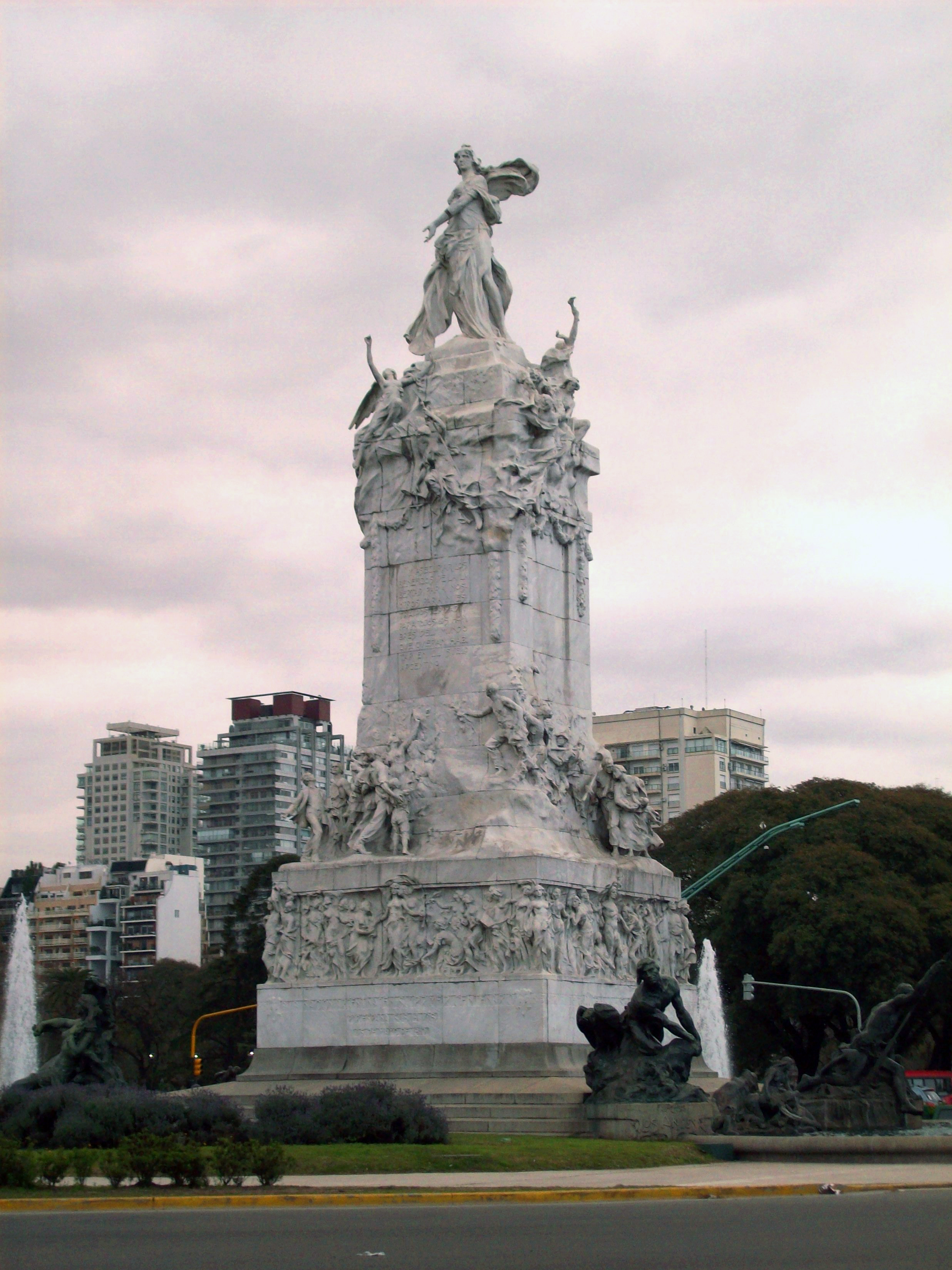
Monument to the Carta Magna

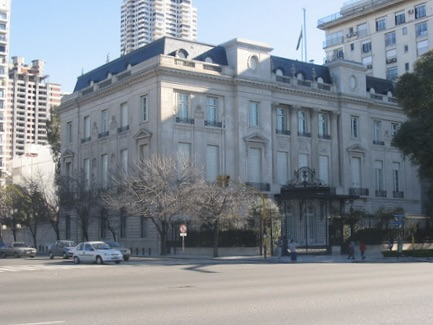
Bosch Palace

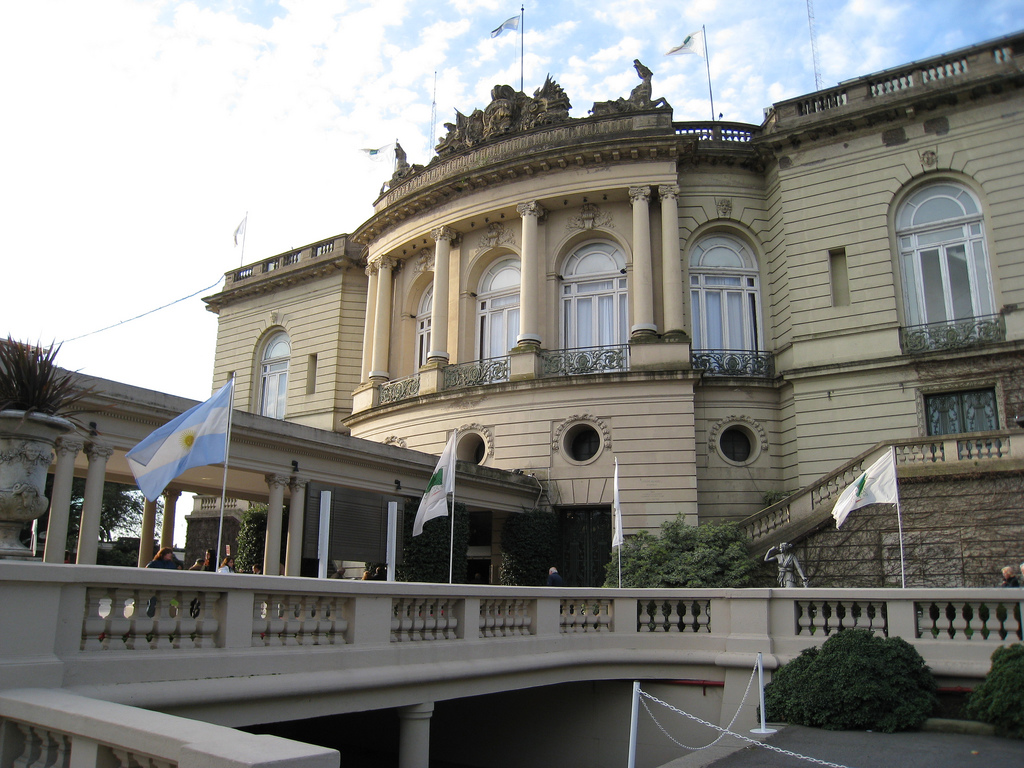
Hipódromo Argentino de Palermo

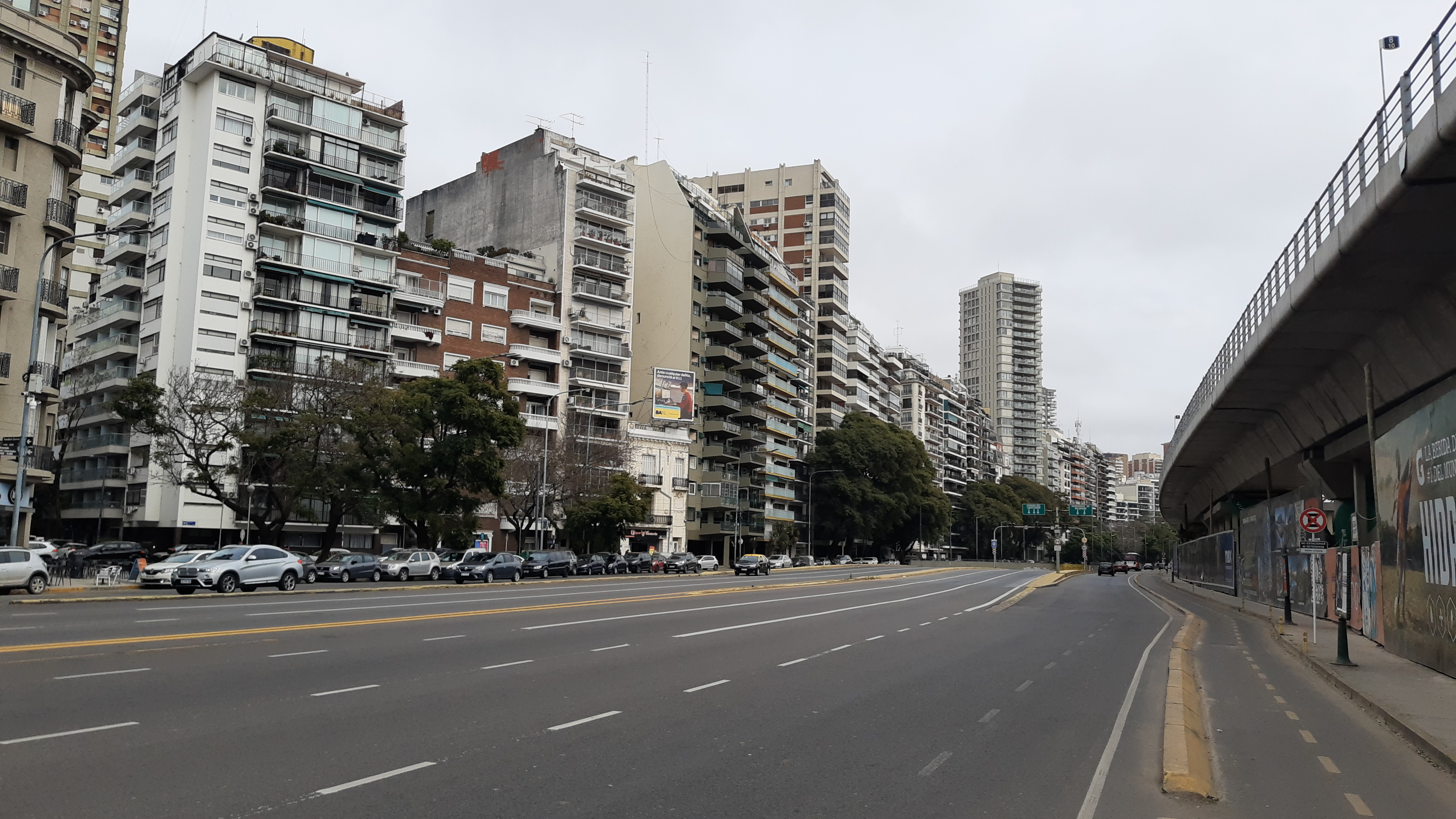
Approaching the Libertador Tunnel in the Belgrano section

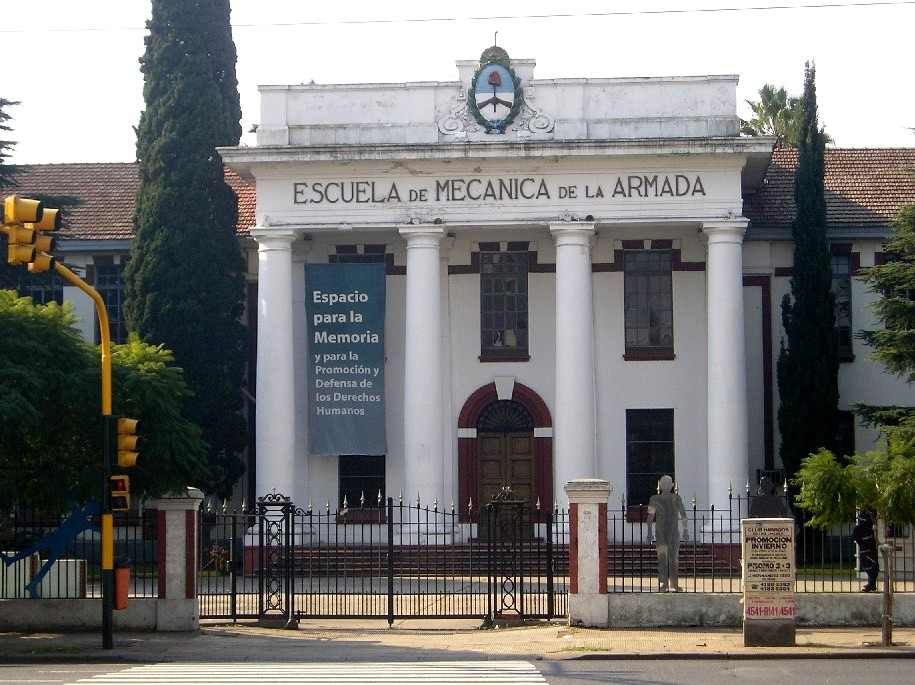
ESMA

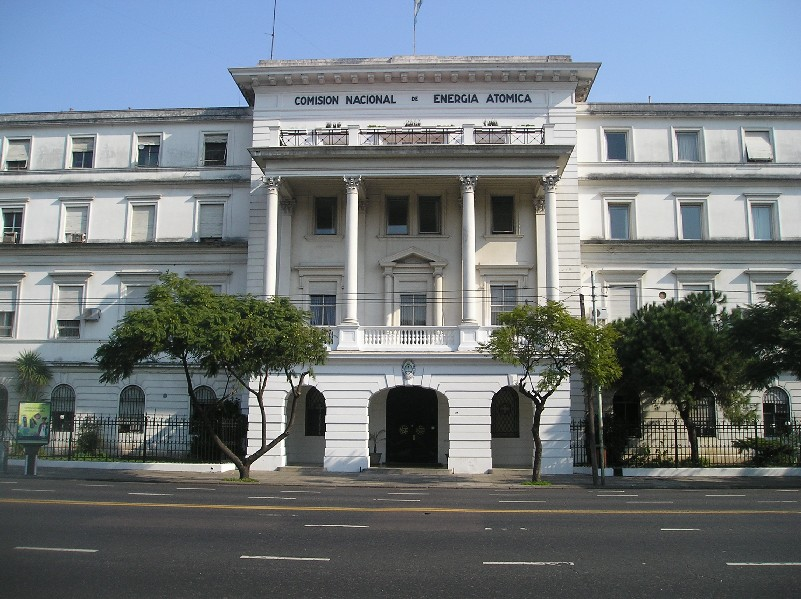
National Atomic Energy Commission
