= Argentina–Pakistan relations =

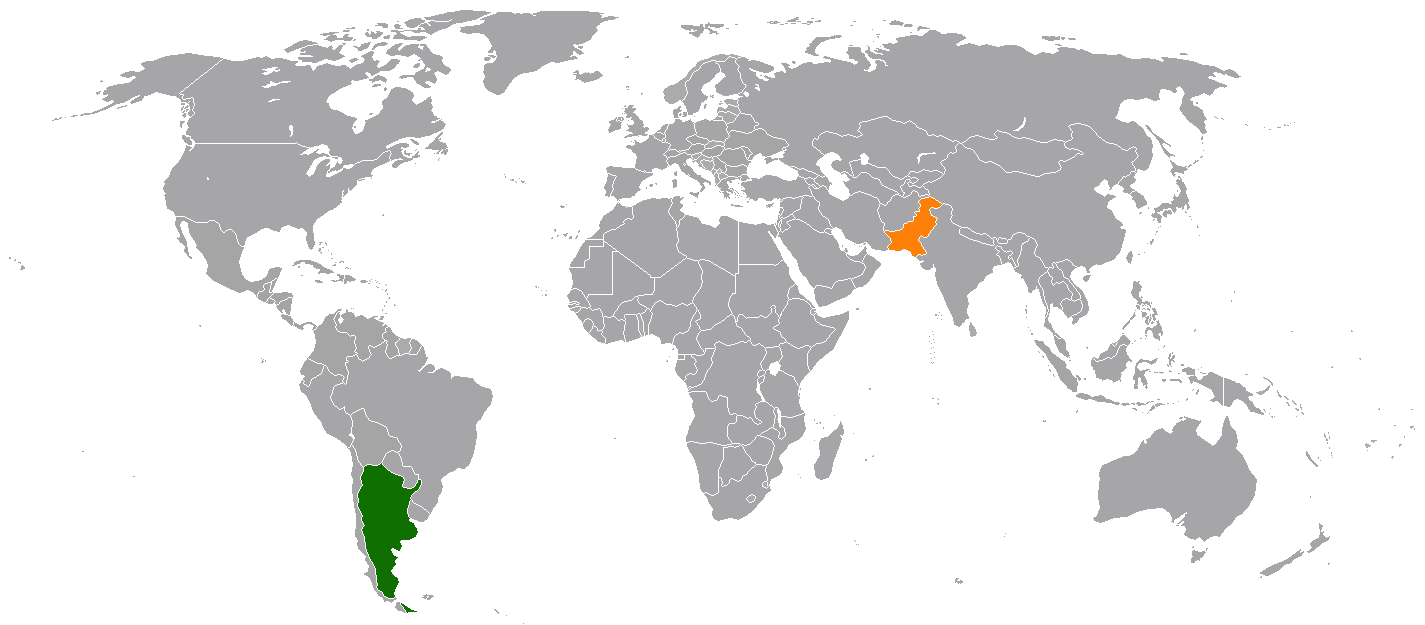
- Argentina: Pakistan

Foreign relations between Argentina and Pakistan, have existed for half a century. The relationship has recently grown with important trade ties developing along with other inter-government communications. Pakistan has an embassy in the Buenos Aires, as does Argentina in Islamabad.

== History ==
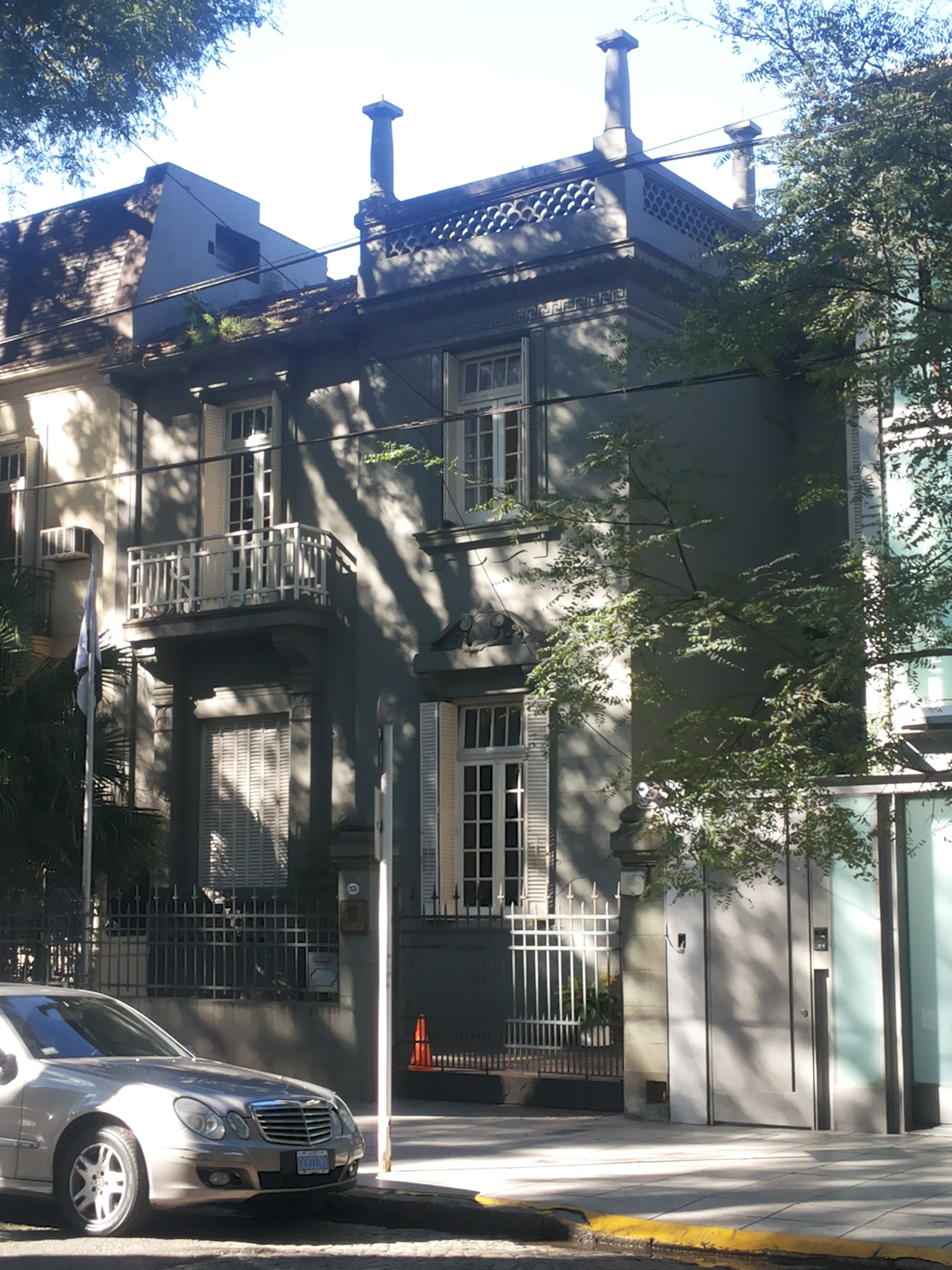
Embassy of Pakistan in Buenos Aires

Pakistan and Argentina formally established relations in October, 1951. The first significant agreement was signed in May 1983. Since then, high level visits have taken place in both countries and relations seem to have grown gradually into the cordial relationship seen today; with agreements, in principle at least, to continue discussions in fields of mutual interest such as their respective economic and political systems.

A formal agreement on bilateral trade and cooperation was signed between Argentina and Pakistan on 19 July 2002, giving their relationship "most favourable nation" status, in accordance with World Trade Organization regulations.

In March 2012, the Government of Argentina emphasised the importance of bilateral relations with Pakistan, inviting the Ambassador of Pakistan Naela Chohan as chief guest to a ceremony in Buenos Aires commemorating 60 years of Pakistan-Argentine friendship.

== Plaza de Pakistan ==
The Plaza de Pakistan's is a landmark in Buenos Aires commemorating Argentine-Pakistan friendship. It is located in the heart of Parque Tres de Febrero in the neighborhood of Palermo. It was redesigned in 2012 and inaugurated on 27 July 2012 by Ambassador Naela Chohan of Pakistan and Minister Diego Santilli of Federal Capital Buenos Aires, to commemorate the 60th anniversary of the establishment of the diplomatic relations between the two friendly countries.

The inauguration ceremony of Plaza de Pakistan was planned between Pakistan's Independence Day on 14 August and Independence Day of Argentina on 9 July. It was also to commemorate the 60th anniversary of the establishment of the diplomatic relations between the two friendly countries. The ceremony included the ribbon cutting by Ambassador Naela Chohan and Minister Diego Santilli followed by unveiling of the plaque with an engraving of a verse by Allama Iqbal which emphasises the importance of love for humanity.

Minister Diego Santilli in his speech, while appreciating the Ambassador for her role in the renovation of the Park, stated that the whole world was reflected in the City of Buenos Aires through its monuments, squares and parks and that Pakistan had a very special place in it.

The Ambassador, in her speech thanked Chief of Government Mauricio Macri and Minister Diego Santilli for their support in restoring Plaza Pakistan and recalled that there was a very beautiful Argentina Park in Islamabad which was a token of the love and affection Pakistan has for Argentina. And today's occasion was a reciprocal gesture from Argentina. She added that "We deeply appreciate this important gesture of friendship and we need to further deepen these bonds of friendship through mutually beneficial co-operation in trade and culture".

== Argentina Park ==
Argentina Park, 33.7197023°N 73.0840598°E, is a beautifully landscaped major park in Islamabad, the capital city of Pakistan. It located in sector G-6/2, across the street from the General Post Office of Islamabad and very close to the main federal governmental institutions of Pakistan, signifying the close relationship between the two nations.

== Diplomacy ==
Argentina has been part of the consensus in favor of the resolution put forward by Pakistan on the right to self-determination which is debated annually at the General Assembly of the United Nations. Pakistan has voted in favor of the UN Resolution stipulating that "the continued existence of colonialism is incompatible with the ideal of universal peace held by the United Nations", which has relevance for the Malvinas Islands issue. Both countries also share common views on United Nations reforms and on the theme of expanding the United Nations Security Council.

The chair of the Pakistan Senate has said of the relationship that "Pakistan and Argentina [have] very close cooperation in various fields and unanimity of views on international issues".

== Cooperation ==
The two countries have well established trade links, they maintain a "Joint Economic Committee" and the Pak-Argentina Business Council, in order to expedite further growth in their relationship. The two countries are currently most concerned with agricultural development schemes, particularly in the areas of livestock disease control, as well as political and diplomatic issues of mutual interest.

Argentina's ambassador to Pakistan has stated that the two governments are involved in exploring new areas in which they can increase cooperation, saying they should both "step up efforts" for tapping into areas that they have not yet explored, including strengthening trade ties through importing wheat, in which Argentina is self-sufficient and in sending further trade delegations between the two nations. The President of the Islamabad Chamber of Commerce concurred with the ambassador and stressed the need for further formal agreements between his organisation and its opposite number in Buenos Aires.

Argentine companies have also expressed their interest in the exploration and development of gas fields in the Pakistani provinces of Balochistan and Sindh.

== State visits ==
Pakistani President Pervez Musharraf visited Argentina in 2004 as part of a visit to three Latin American countries in order to boost economic and political relations between Pakistan and the region as a whole and Argentina specifically.

Musharraf also held meetings with the Argentine President and, in a speech to the Argentine Council for International Relations, alluded to further cooperation on issues of mutual interest at the UN and further strengthening of economic and political links between the nations.

== Resident diplomatic missions ==
- Argentina has an embassy in Islamabad.
- Pakistan has an embassy in Buenos Aires.

== See also ==
- Naela Chohan - the Ambassador of Pakistan to Argentina.
- Pakistani Argentines
