= Musa Javed Chohan =

Pakistani diplomat

Pakistan Ambassador to Canada
- In office 2007–2009
- President: Pervez Musharraf

Pakistan Ambassador to France
- In office 2001–2003
- President: Pervez Musharraf

Pakistan Ambassador to UNESCO
- In office 2001–2003
- President: Pervez Musharraf

Pakistan Ambassador to Malaysia
- In office 1997–2001
- President: Muhammad Rafiq Tarar

Personal details
- Born: 30 May 1948 (age 78) Pind Dadan Khan, Pakistan
- Spouse: Naela Chohan
- Children: Omar Javed Chohan, Usman W. Chohan, Ibrahim Abubakr Chohan
- Education: Fletcher School of Law and Diplomacy, Government College, Lahore
- Occupation: Ambassador

Musa Javed Chohan (Urdu: موسی جاوید چوہان) (b. 30 May 1948 in Pind Dadan Khan, Pakistan) is the former High Commissioner of Pakistan to Canada, as well as the former ambassador of Pakistan to France and Pakistan's permanent representative to UNESCO from 2001 to 2003.

He has previously served as High Commissioner of Pakistan to Malaysia. In view of his efforts to further improve relations between France and Pakistan, he was awarded the Ordre National du Mérite for which he is a Commandeur.

== Education ==
Ambassador Chohan holds four master's degrees: International Relations & Diplomacy; History; English Literature; and Defence and Strategic Studies. He is conversant in English, French, Urdu and Punjabi languages. He is an alumnus of Government College, Lahore and the Fletcher School of Law and Diplomacy.

== Career ==
Ambassador Chohan has served as Pakistan's Ambassador Plenipotentiary and Extraordinary to France (2001–2003) and as High Commissioner to Malaysia (1997–2001). He was also Pakistan's Permanent Representative to UNESCO (2001–2003). Earlier, his assignments have included postings in the Pakistan Missions at Tehran, Guinea, Glasgow and Paris. He also served in Pakistan's Permanent Mission to the United Nations at New York.

In 1971 he started as an officer of the Foreign Service of Pakistan, he has also worked on various posts at the Ministry of Foreign Affairs, Islamabad. These included assignments like Special Secretary Foreign Affairs (2003–2004), Director General (South Asia), Director General (Americas), Director General (Foreign Minister's Office), Director (Foreign Secretary's Office) and Director (Afghanistan). He was also a participant of the Senior Officers' Course at Pakistan's National Defence College in 1995–1996. Ambassador Chohan has participated in several conferences, seminars, symposia and meetings of the international and regional organisations, including the 40th, 41st and 42nd sessions of the UN General Assembly, UNESCO Executive Council and General Conference, UNFPA, UNDP, NAM, and the summits and Foreign Ministers' meetings of the Organisation of Islamic Conference (OIC) and the Economic Cooperation Organization (ECO). Between 2004 and 2006, he oversaw the training of new entrants to the Foreign Service of Pakistan in his capacity as Director General, Foreign Service Academy at Islamabad, Pakistan.

== Literary works ==
Ambassador Chohan authored Ghungroo (2017), a fictional biographic novel set in 20th century Lahore, and published a collection of his poems entitled Barricaded Self, (2007).

== Family ==
He is married to Ambassador Naela Chohan, and has three children: Omar Javed Chohan, Usman W. Chohan, and Ibrahim Abubakr Chohan.
