= High Commission of Canada, Islamabad =

Diplomatic mission of Canada in Pakistan

High Commission of Canada in Pakistan Haut-commissariat du Canada au Pakistan (French)
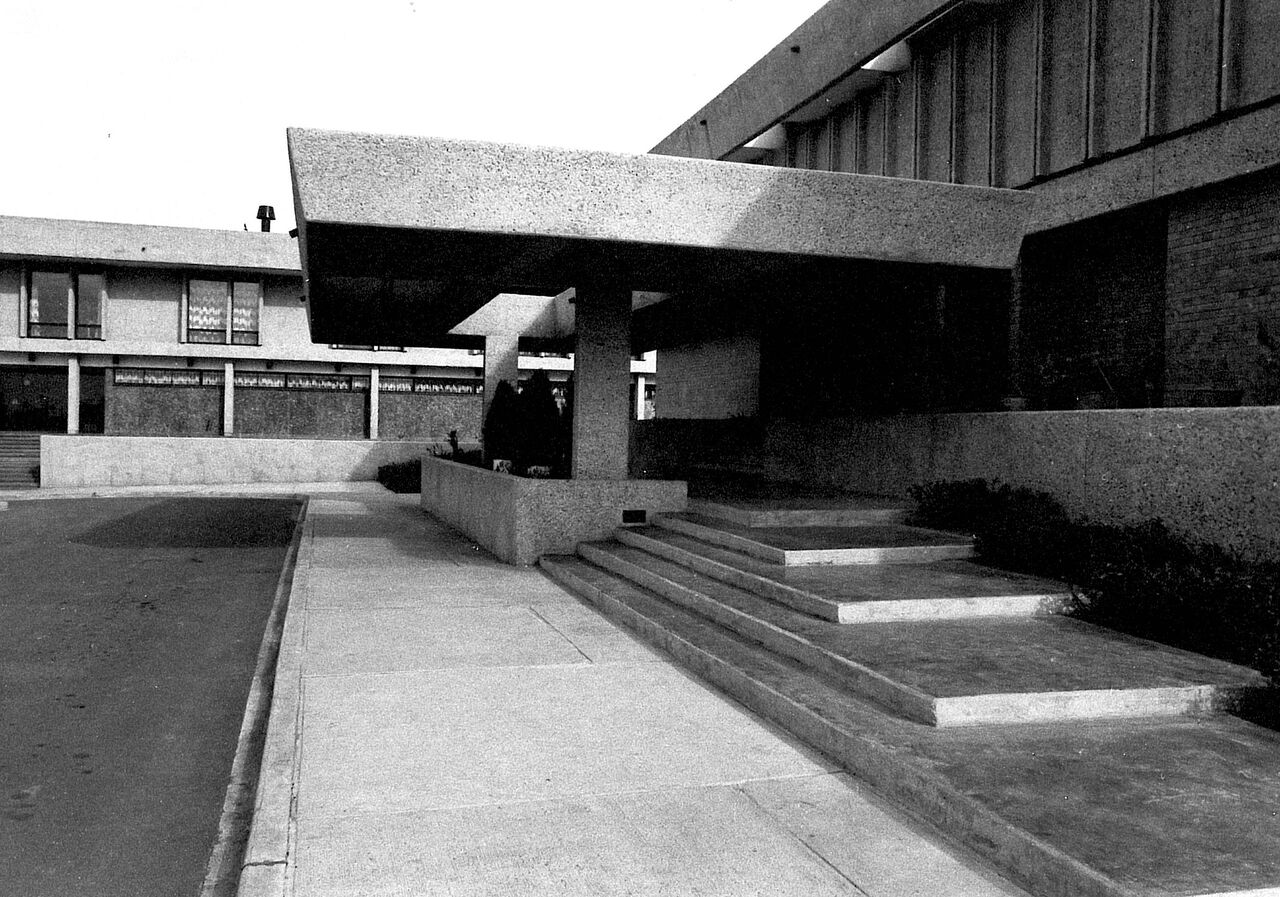
- The Canadian High Commission building in 1967
- Location: Islamabad, Islamabad Capital Territory, Pakistan
- Address: Diplomatic Enclave, Sector G-5, P.O. Box 1042
- Coordinates: 33°43′34.7″N 73°6′29.0″E
- High Commissioner: Leslie Scanlon
- Website: High Commission of Canada in Pakistan

The High Commission of Canada in Pakistan is the diplomatic mission of Canada in Pakistan. It is located on the Diplomatic Enclave in Sector G-5 of Islamabad. Leslie Scanlon is the current High Commissioner of Canada to Pakistan. Canada also maintains an honorary consul-cum-trade office in Karachi, and an honorary consul in Lahore.

== History ==
Canada established its High Commission in Karachi, which was then the capital of Pakistan, in May 1949. Following Islamabad's declaration as the federal capital in 1967, the present High Commission building was designed by the Canadian architect Isadore Coop and inaugurated that same year. In 1972, a monumental wooden sculpture carved by Anne Kahane known as La Mer ("The Sea") was commissioned for the Canadian High Commission in Islamabad.

== Operations ==
The High Commission represents the Canadian government's interests in Pakistan, including political, economic, cultural and defence relations, and also provides consular services to Canadian citizens in Pakistan. In addition, it is involved in several development projects throughout Pakistan. A Liaison Officer of the Royal Canadian Mounted Police is posted at the mission who acts as Canada's law enforcement representative in the region, holding cross-accreditation in eight other countries of Southwest and Central Asia.

== See also ==
- Canada–Pakistan relations
- High Commission of Pakistan, Ottawa
