= Isadore Coop =

Canadian architect (1926–2003)

Isadore "Issie" Coop (1926–2003) was a Canadian architect and a Fellow of the Royal Architectural Institute of Canada, with a reputation for highly functional, cost-effective architecture. A student of the famed American-German architect Ludwig Mies van der Rohe, Coop brought the Miesian style to Winnipeg, and changed the face of Winnipeg architecture, according to one writer.

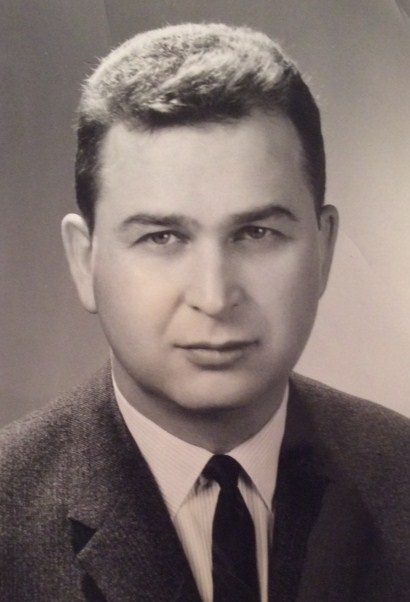
Isadore Coop

== Early life and education ==
Isidore Coop was born in Winnipeg in 1926. His father died when Coop was 12 years old. As a result, his family lived in poverty for many years, behind a corner grocery store run by his mother in the north end of Winnipeg. Coop delivered bread on a bicycle to help make ends meet.

Coop received a secular Jewish education at the I. L. Peretz Folk School in Winnipeg. This experience, along with this childhood poverty, influenced his lifelong values. Throughout his life, Coop consistently focused on supporting disadvantaged individuals.

Coop also attended Isaac Newton School in Winnipeg, excelling in science and mathematics. It was also at Isaac Newton that Coop discovered his love of art and drawing. The combination of science and art would naturally draw him to architecture.

In 1947, Coop was awarded the Manitoba Association of Architects Scholarship and the Isbister Scholarship in Architecture. In 1948, he obtained his Bachelor of Architecture from the University of Manitoba, Faculty of Architecture. Upon graduating, Coop apprenticed with the architectural firm of Green, Blankstein, Russell (GBR). In 1951, he registered with the Manitoba Association of Architects.

From 1951 to 1953, Coop attended the Illinois Institute of Technology (IIT), studying with the famed architectural Modernist Ludwig Mies van der Rohe. He graduated with a Masters of Science in Architecture. The Miesian aphorisms "less is more" and "God is in the details" would influence Coop's work his entire career.

== Blankstein, Coop ==
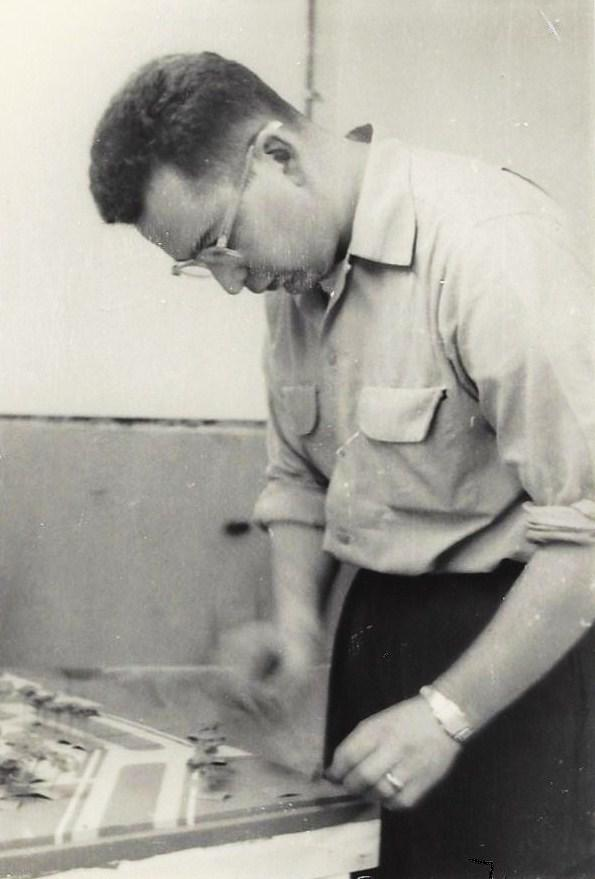
Isadore Coop at Work

Coop returned to Winnipeg and continued his work at GBR for several years, where he was involved with such projects as the new Winnipeg General Post Office on Graham Avenue and the Manitoba Power Commission Building on Portage Avenue.

However, in 1956 he struck out to create his own architectural partnership with his colleague at GBR and schoolmate at IIT, Morley Blankstein. The firm Blankstein Coop was born.

In 1957, Blankstein Coop came second in an Alcan competition for a Toronto office building. In 1958, the firm competed against 90 other architects in a national competition for the new Winnipeg City Hall, for which they received an honourable mention.

In 1959, Blankstein and Coop were joined by architects Alan Hanna and R. Douglas Gillmor to form Blankstein, Coop, Gillmor and Hanna.

In 1962, the expanded firm won a national competition for the Mendel Art Gallery and Conservatory in Saskatoon (constructed in 1965), a major creative cultural centre for that city. It also won an award for the Canadian Housing Design Council for a multi-housing development at the corner of Grant and Centennial.

== Architectural Group ==
In 1964, the firm joined Allan Waisman and Jack Ross of Waisman Ross Architects, to form Waisman Ross – Blankstein, Coop, Gillmor and Hanna. In 1969, when the long firm name proved too unwieldy, it was changed to the more whimsical Number Ten Architectural Group (or "Number Ten", after the firm's Winnipeg address at 10 Donald Street).

At Number Ten, Coop led many architecturally significant projects, including the University of Manitoba Student Union Building (also known as University Centre), with Number Ten architect Carl Nelson, Jr. In 1970, he was partner-in-charge of Number Ten's collaboration with architect Gustavo Da Roza on the Winnipeg Art Gallery. In 1977, Coop would again successfully collaborate with Da Roza on their submission to the National Gallery Competition, for which their entry was awarded second place, after John C. Parkin’s.

Other significant Winnipeg projects on which Coop led design and production include a consortium for the Winnipeg Convention Centre (1972-1974), the Royal Trust Tower, and the Rupertsland Square Complex. He also led the firm's work on the Canadian Embassy in Islamabad, Pakistan, seven major buildings at the University of Manitoba, two high-rise Sheraton Hotels for Winnipeg and Hamilton, five multiple housing-commercial projects for Lakeview Development of Winnipeg, and two shopping centre projects for Fairweather Properties of Winnipeg.

== Portage Place ==
In 1984, Coop was appointed as CEO of the North Portage Development Corporation, a corporation created and funded by three levels government (municipal, provincial and federal) in a controversial attempt to redevelop and revitalize the north side of Portage Avenue in downtown Winnipeg. To accept this appointment, Coop retired from Number Ten. The resulting structure, Portage Place, was constructed in 1987. It has significantly altered the vitality of Winnipeg's downtown core. The enclosed mall, covering three city blocks, with large, naturally lighted indoor atriums and a sky walk system linking Portage Place to the Bay, One Canada Centre, and the Carlton Building, has altered Winnipeg's cityscape.

== Service to the Profession and Community ==
As a member of the Manitoba Association of Architects, Ontario Association of Architects, Saskatchewan Association of Architects, and Chartered Architect in the Republic of Zambia, and a Fellow of the Royal Architectural Institute of Canada, Coop was deeply involved in the profession.

During his early years Coop worked as a part-time lecturer and design and thesis critic at the School of Architecture at the University of Manitoba.

In 1961, he was appointed a member of the Building Commission of the City of Winnipeg, a volunteer position which he held from 1961 to 1969, where he also served as its Vice-Chairman. He also served as a volunteer member of the Part 3 Committee for the Manitoba Building Code. Such service reflected his interest in improving the quality and functionality of architecture, as did his volunteer service on three committees for the National Building Code - the Standing Committee for Use and Occupancy (Member), the High-Rise Subcommittee (Chairman), and the Associate Committee (Member). It further reflected Coop's appreciation of the important role played by legislation in establishing standards to protect the public and ensure its safety.

Coop was elected president of the Manitoba Association of Architects (MAA) in 1963, and served as Chairman or Member of many MAA committees (Committee on Metropolitan Planning and Codes, Fees Committee, Professional Usage Committee).

Coop was elected to the College of Fellows for the Royal Architectural Institute of Canada (RAIC) in 1964 – the youngest fellow ever appointed by the RAIC. He subsequently served on the board of directors of the RAIC Foundation, the RAIC Committee on Education, and the RAIC Legal Documents Committee. In February 1994, Coop was awarded an Honorary Life Membership in the MAA.

Coop served on the boards of the Manitoba Chamber Orchestra and the Royal Winnipeg Ballet, and was involved with the YMHA and the Canadian Council of Christians and Jews.

Coop also provided pro bono architectural services for the replanning of four departments at the Manitoba Cancer Treatment and Research Foundation, and to various charities, such as the St. Amant Centre for children with disabilities, run by the Grey Nuns of Winnipeg.

== Major Architectural Works ==
Coop's major architectural works include:

- Manitoba Power Commission Building, 1955
- Winnipeg General Post Office, 1958
- Isbister Building, University of Manitoba, 1961
- Department of Biological Sciences, University of Manitoba (formerly the Pharmacy Building), 1962
- Joyce Fromson Swimming Pool Building, University of Manitoba, 1964-65
- Mendel Art Gallery and Conservatory, Saskatoon, 1965
- Kildonan Park Peguis Pavilion, Winnipeg, 1965
- Fletcher Argue Building, University of Manitoba, 1967
- Canadian Embassy, Islamabad, Pakistan, 1967
- University Centre (University of Manitoba Student Union Building), 1969
- The Winnipeg Art Gallery, 1971
- St. Amant Centre, 1972
- Frank Kennedy Centre, University of Manitoba, 1972
- Winnipeg Convention Centre, 1974
- Rupertsland Square Complex, 1977
- Royal Trust Tower, Winnipeg, 1981
- Duckworth Center, University of Winnipeg, 1983
- Manitoba Provincial Law Courts, 1985

Other smaller scale works of note:

- Man With An Axe Clothing Store (Clifford's Ladies Wear), 412 Portage Avenue, Winnipeg, 1958
- Row Housing at 745-757 Centennial Street, Winnipeg, 1959
- Private Residence, 829 Lanark Street, Winnipeg, 1958.
- Private Residence, 811 Lanark Street, Winnipeg, 1959.
- Private Residence, 512 South Drive, Winnipeg, 1967.

== Gallery ==
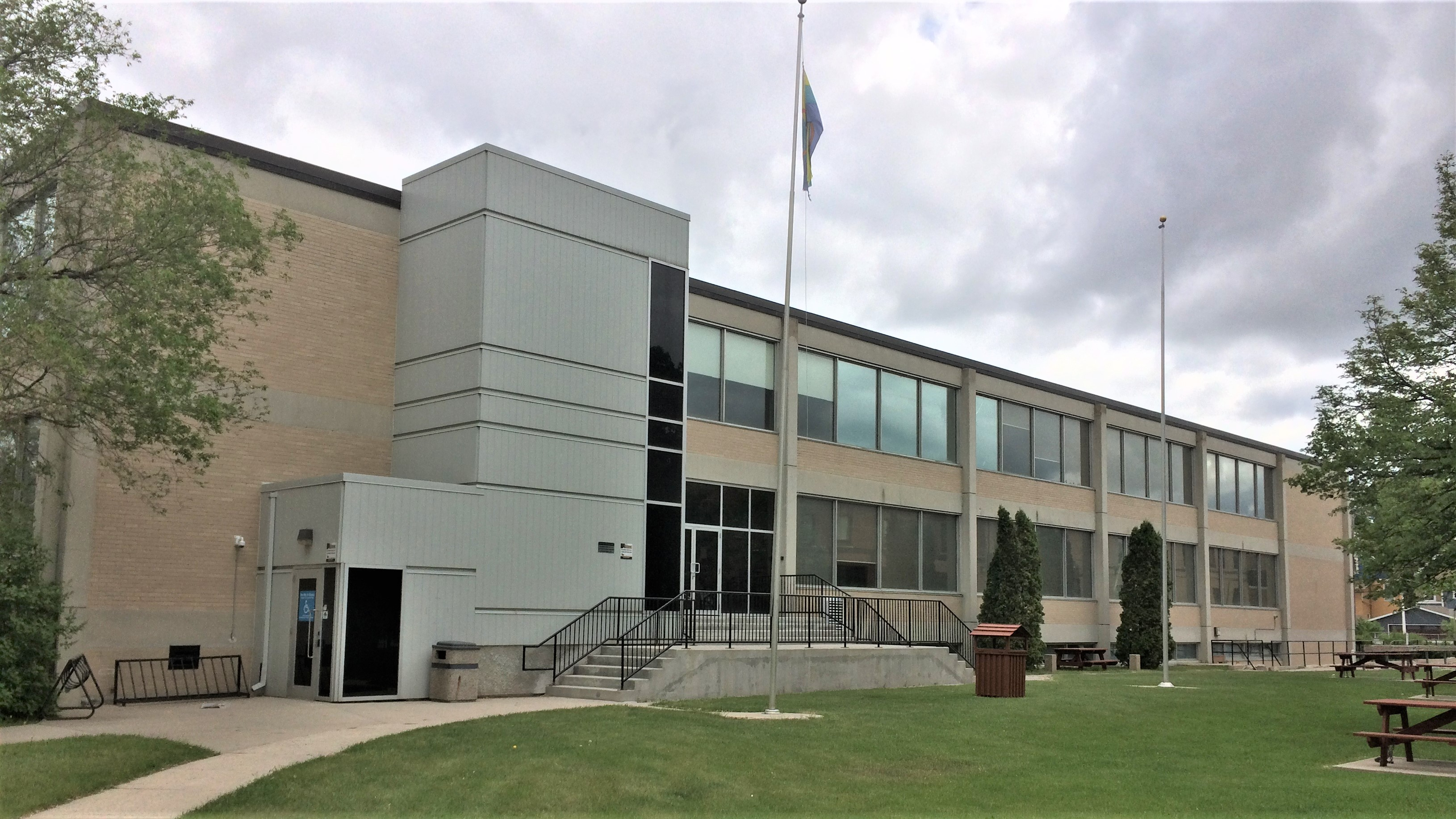
Manitoba Power Commission Building, 1955

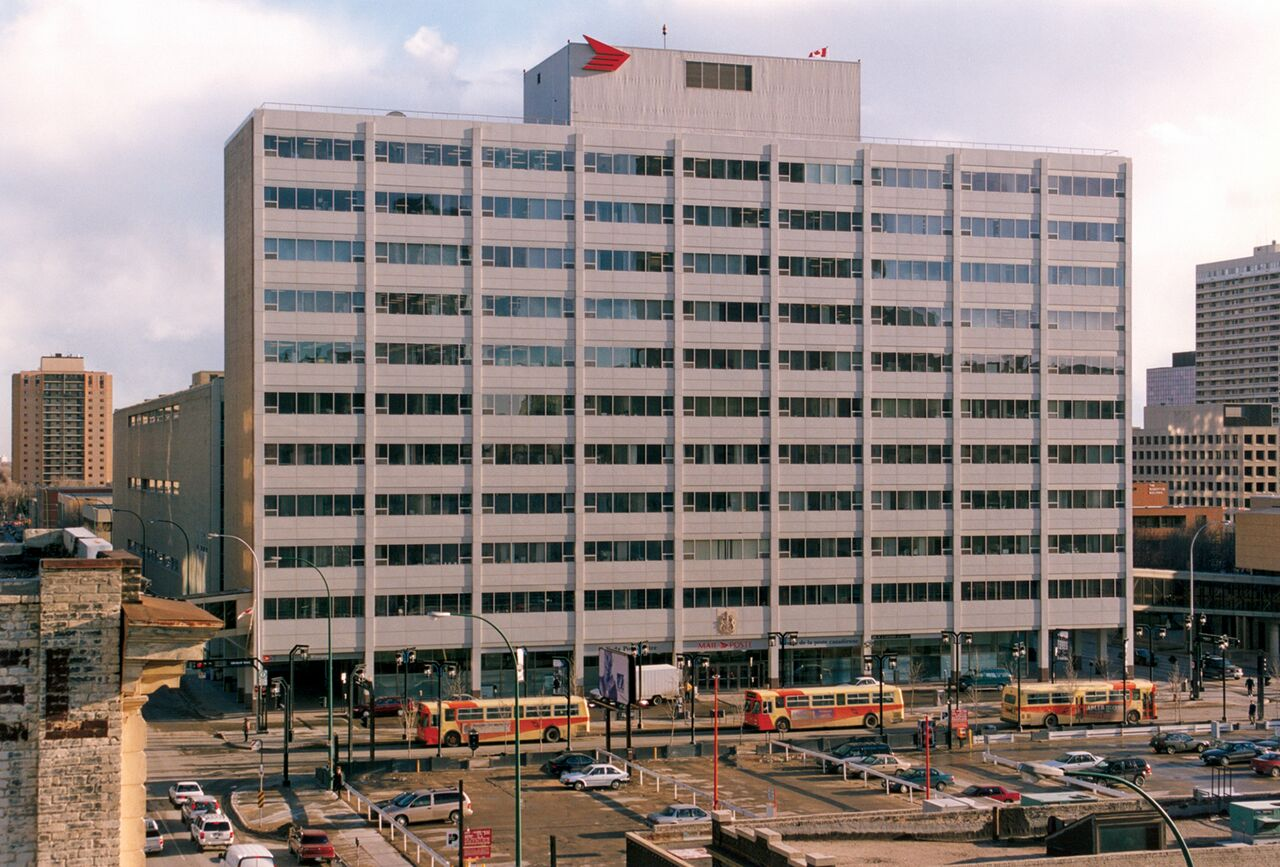
Winnipeg General Post Office, 1958

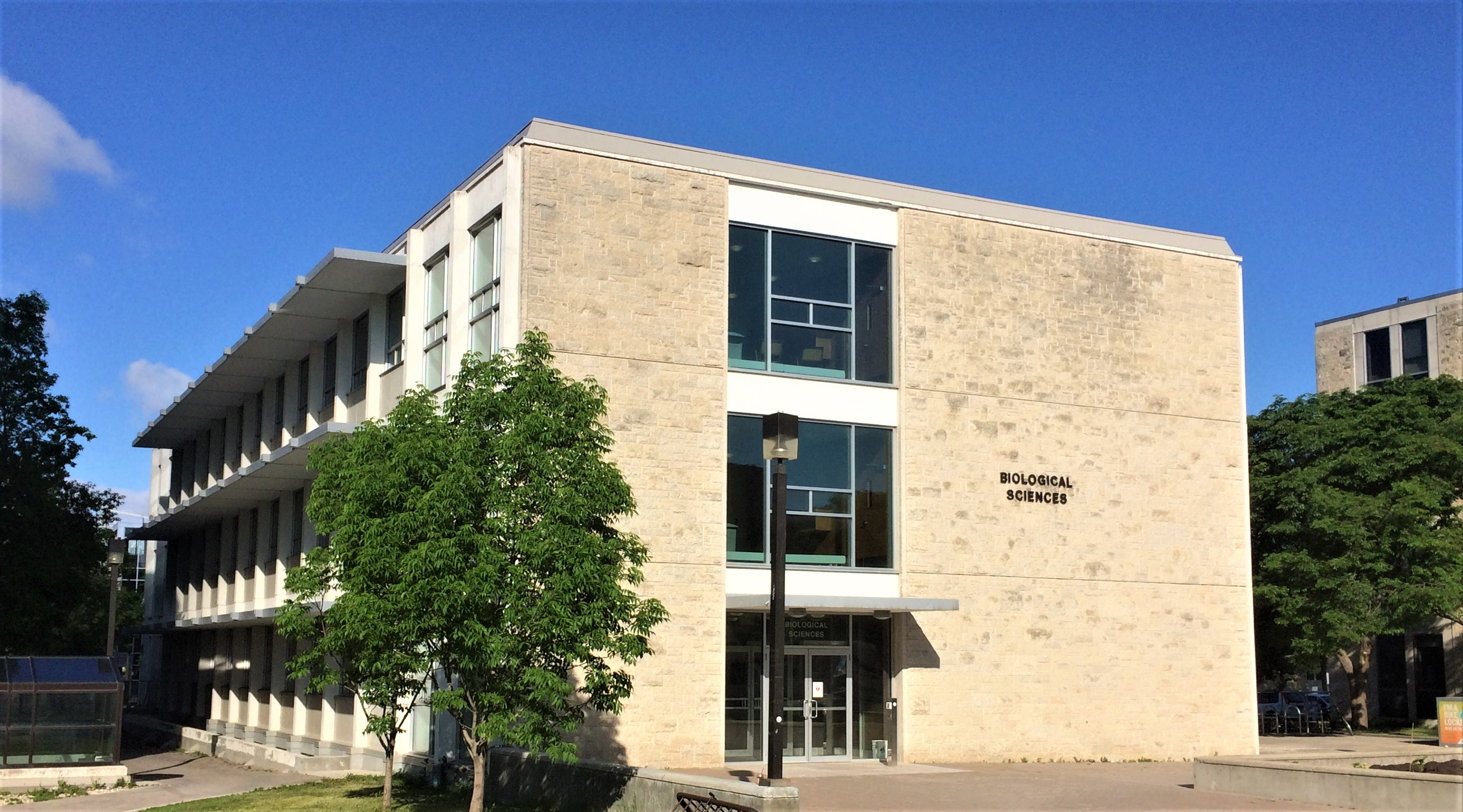
Department of Biological Sciences, University of Manitoba (formerly the Pharmacy Building), 1962

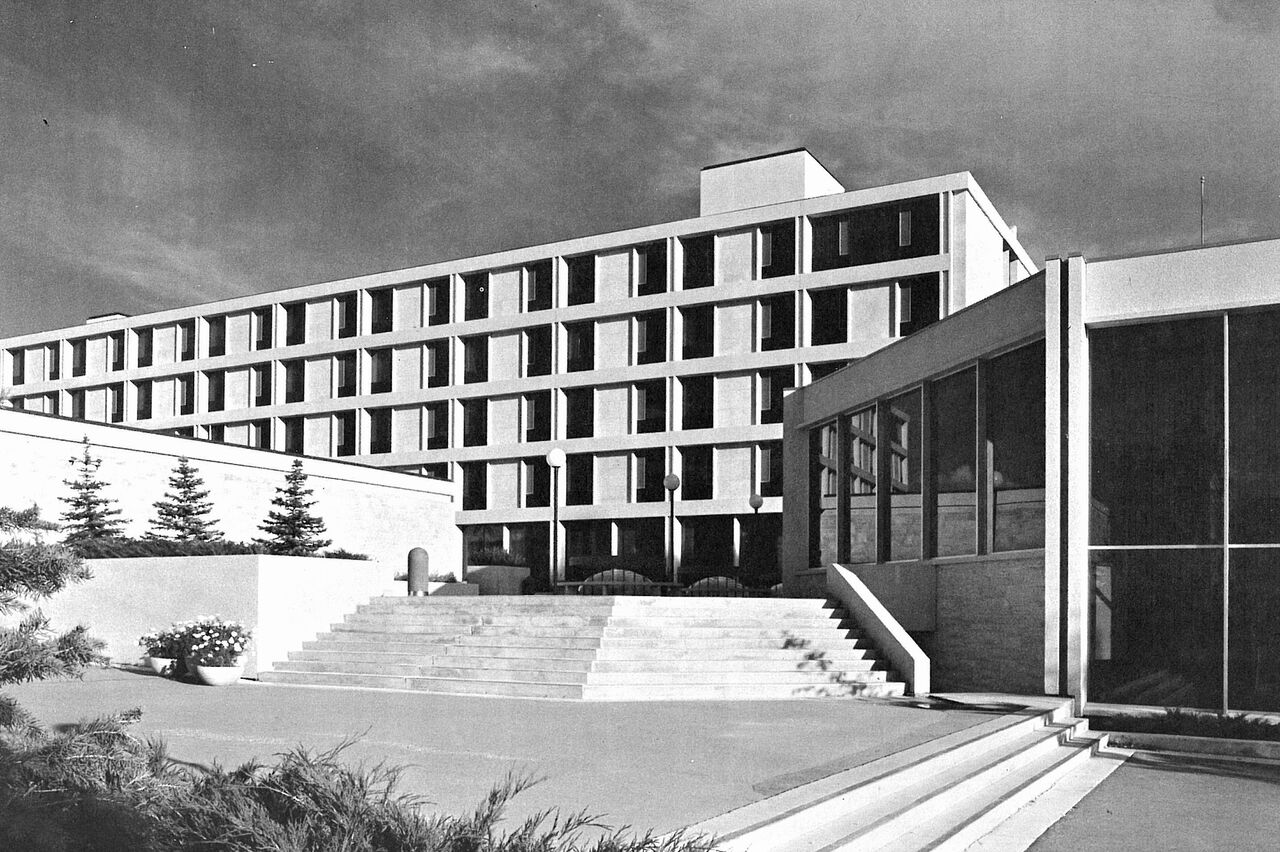
Fletcher Argue Building, University of Manitoba, 1967

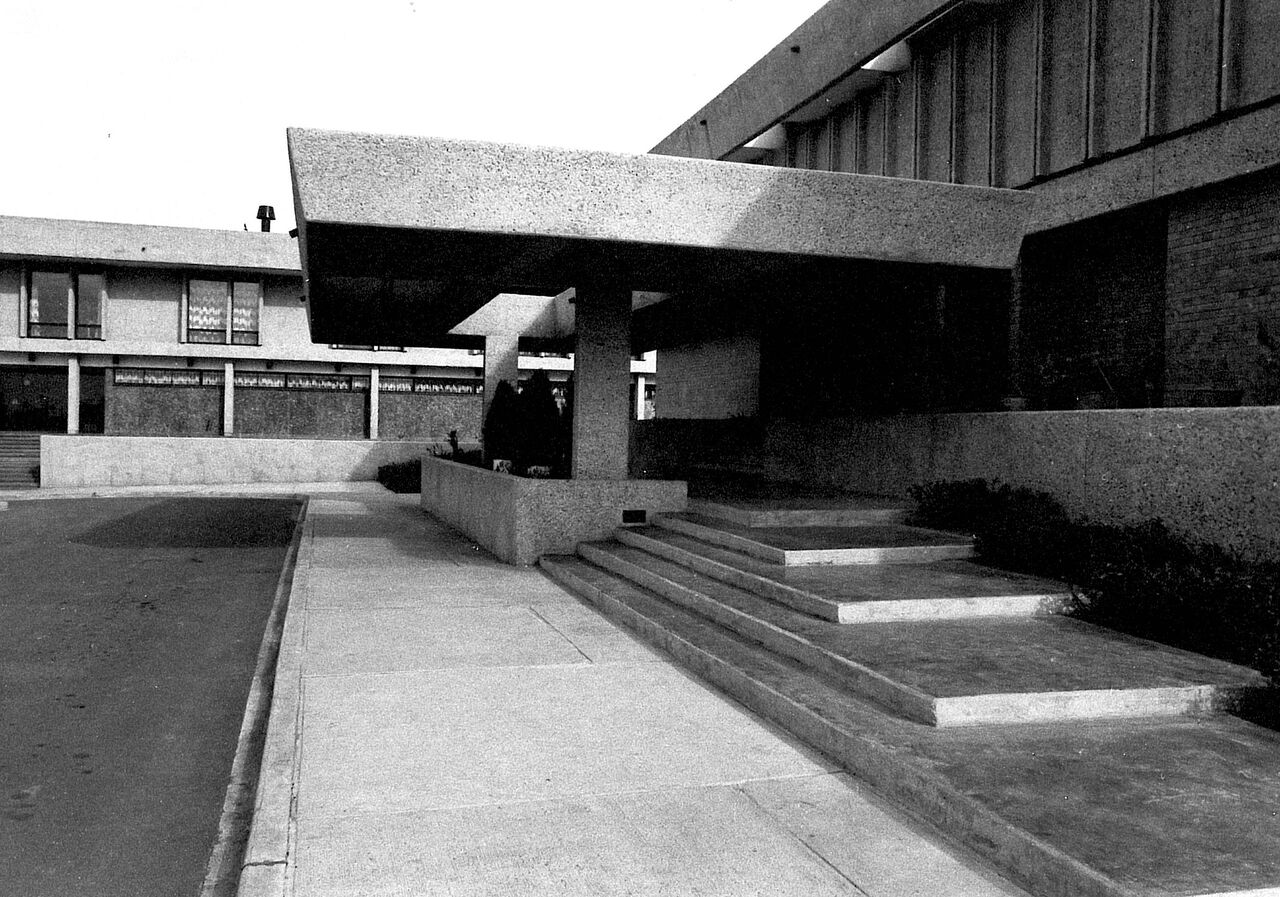
Canadian Embassy, Islamabad, Pakistan, 1967

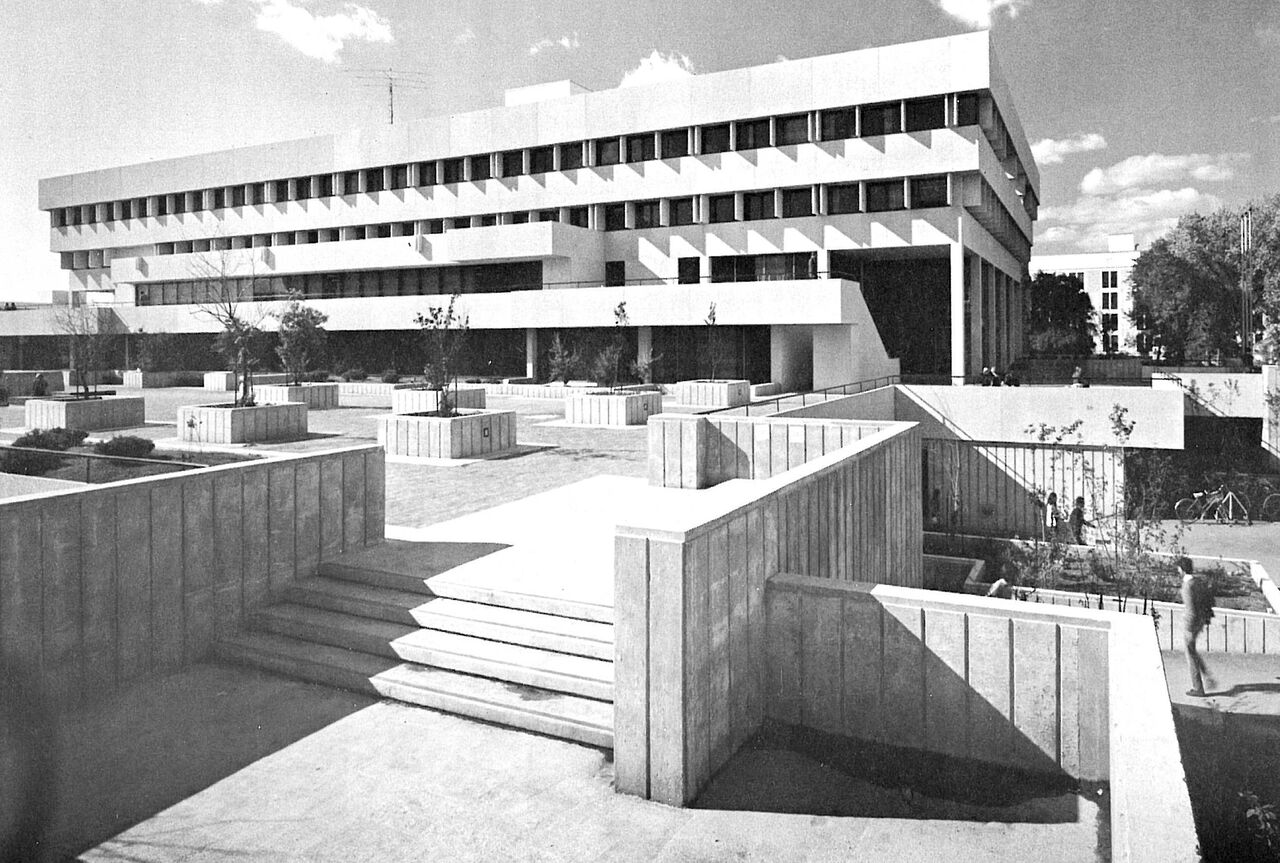
University Centre, University of Manitoba Student Union Building, 1969

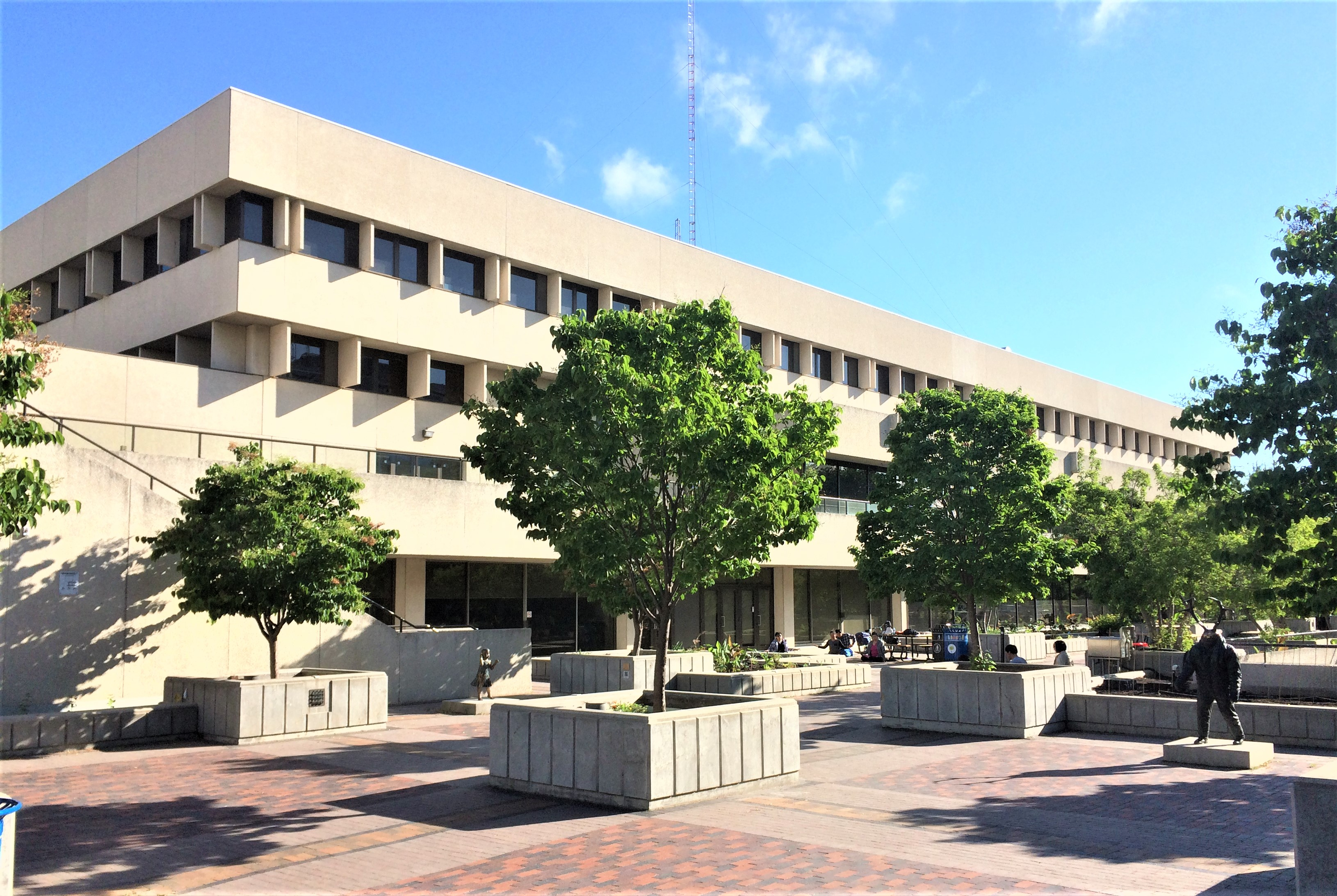
University Centre (University of Manitoba Student Union Building), 1969 (4)

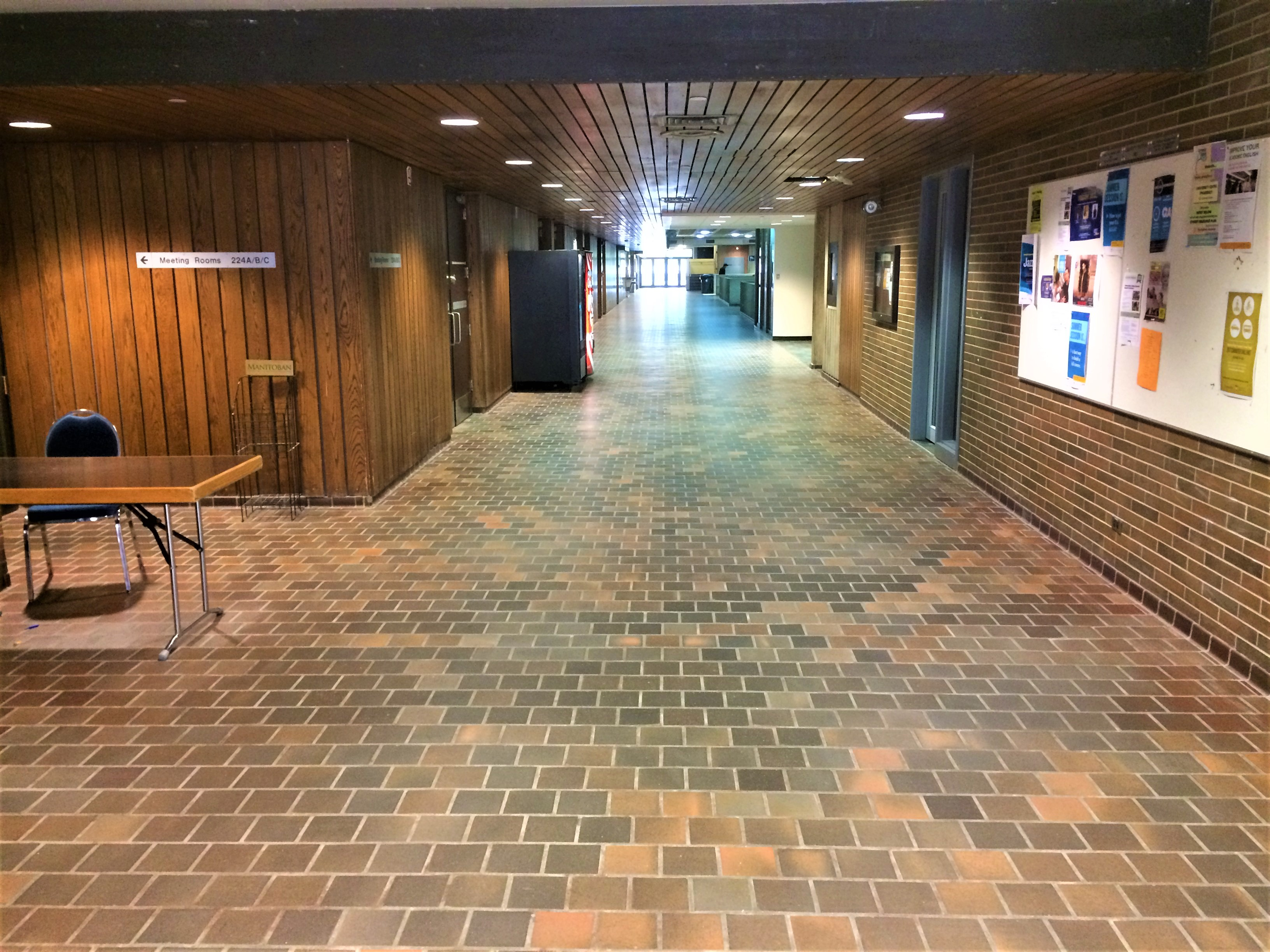
University Centre (University of Manitoba Student Union Building), 1969 (1)

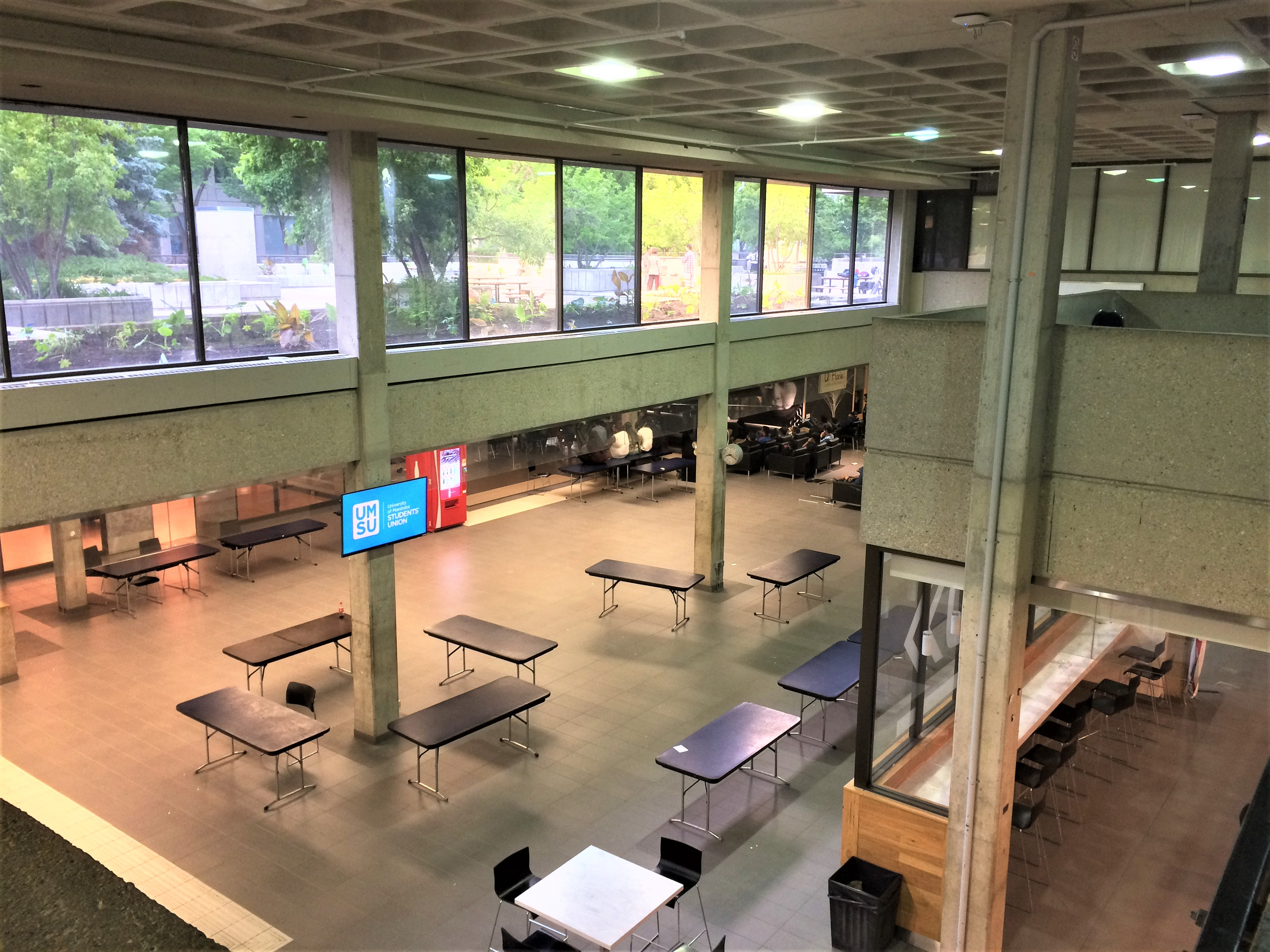
University Centre (University of Manitoba Student Union Building), 1969 (2)

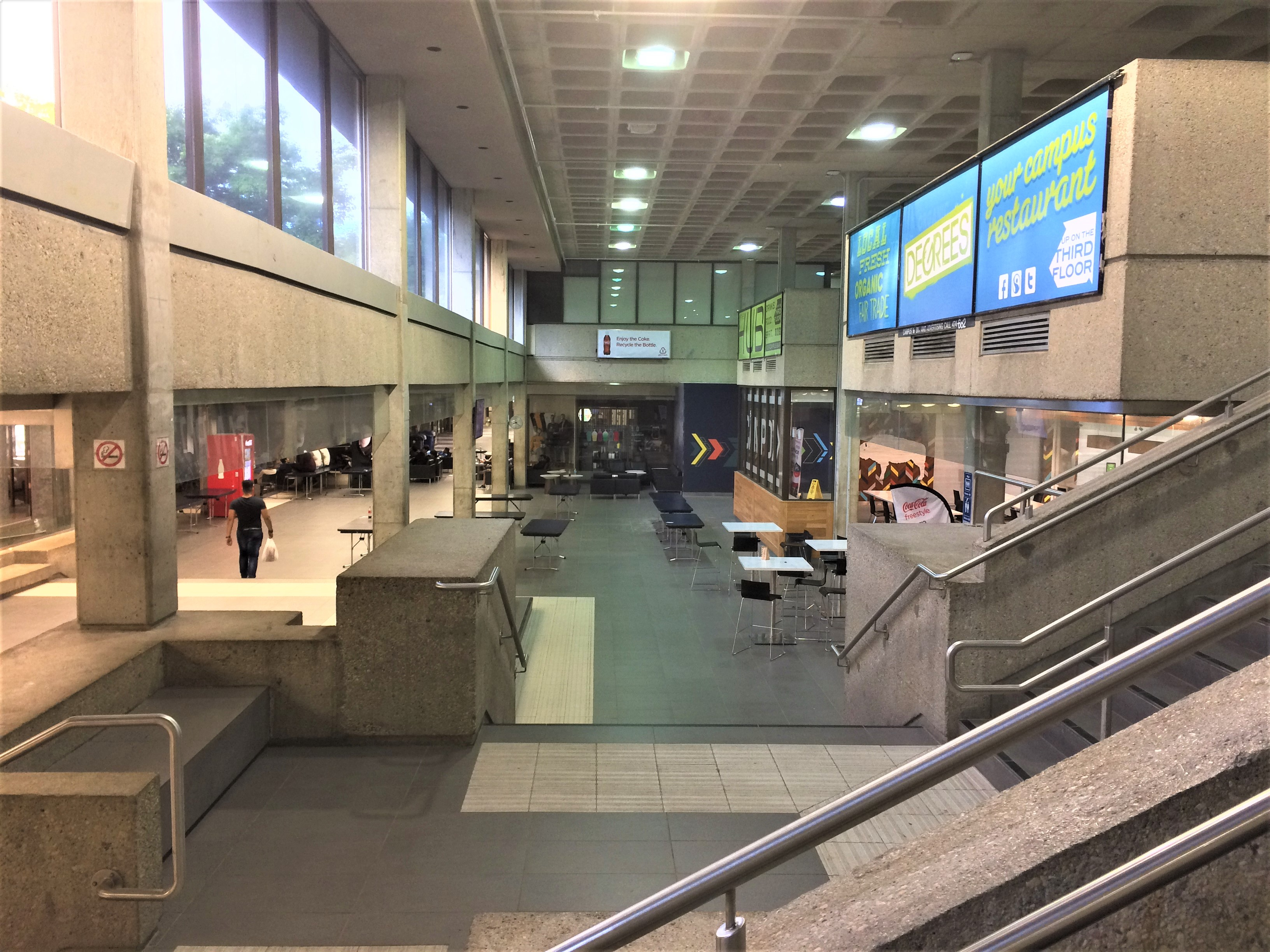
University Centre (University of Manitoba Student Union Building), 1969 (3)

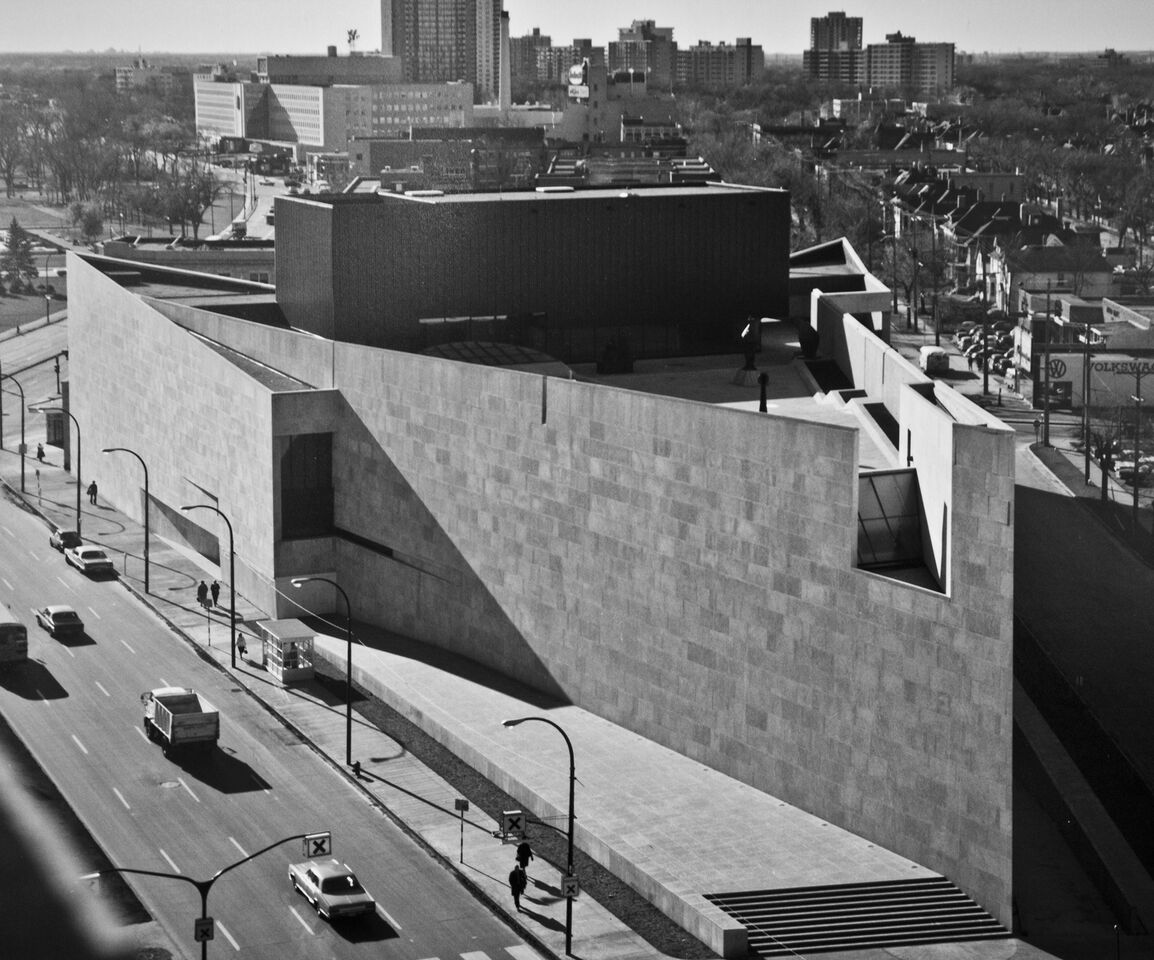
Winnipeg Art Gallery, 1971

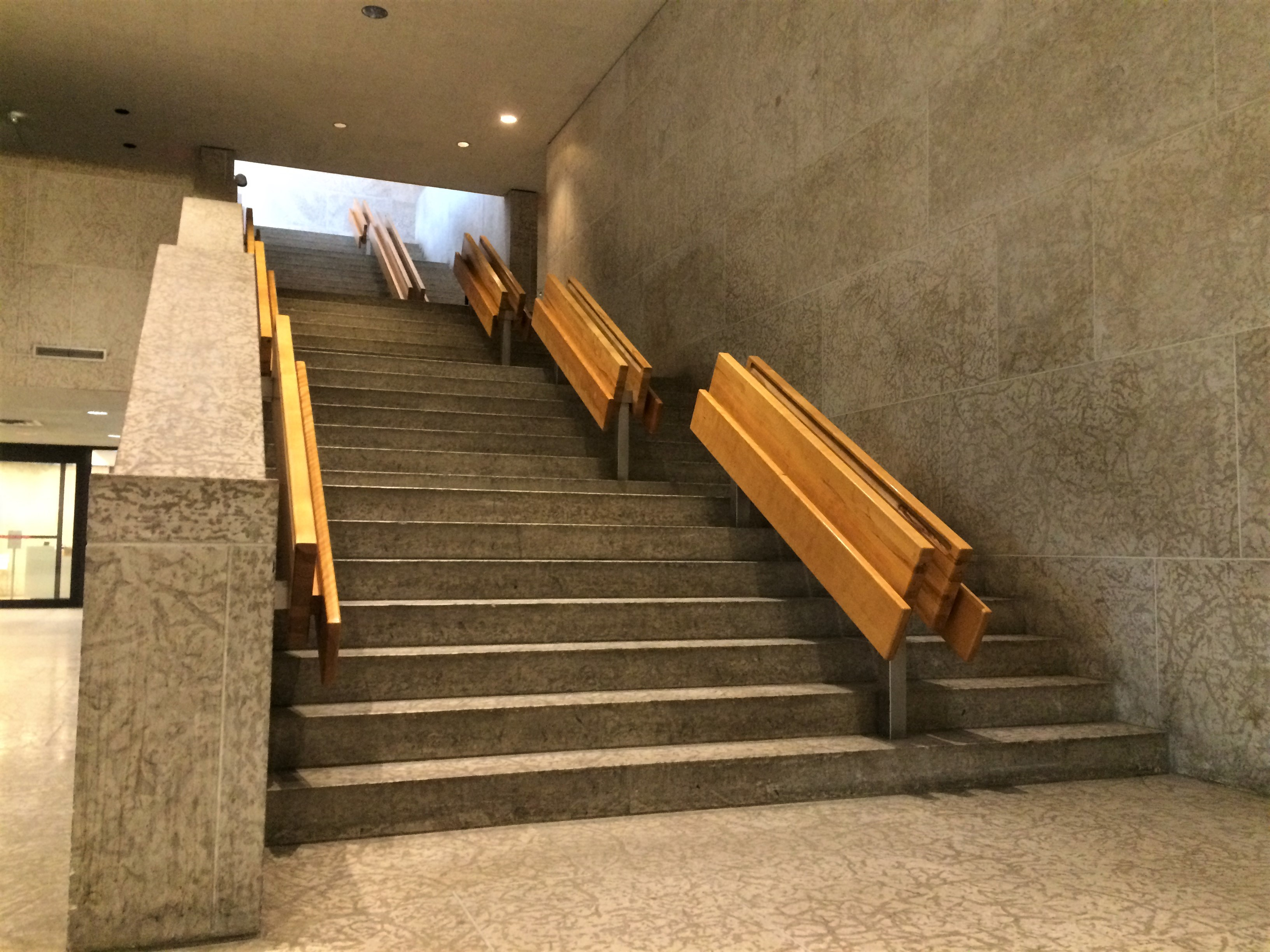
The Winnipeg Art Gallery, 1971 - Main Staircase

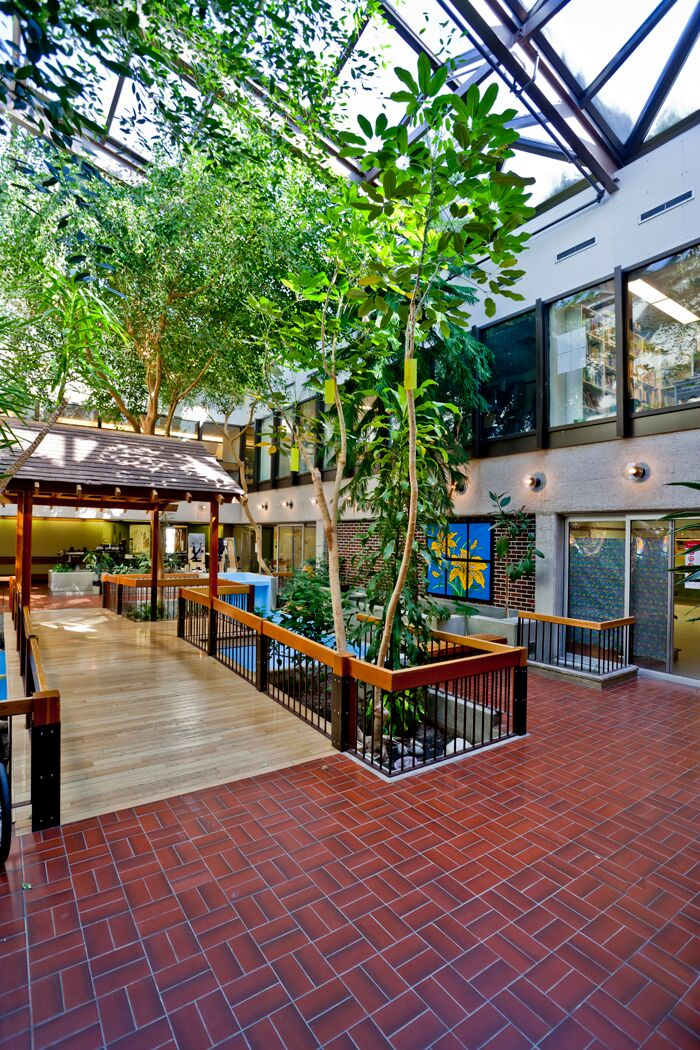
St. Amant Centre, Winnipeg, 1972

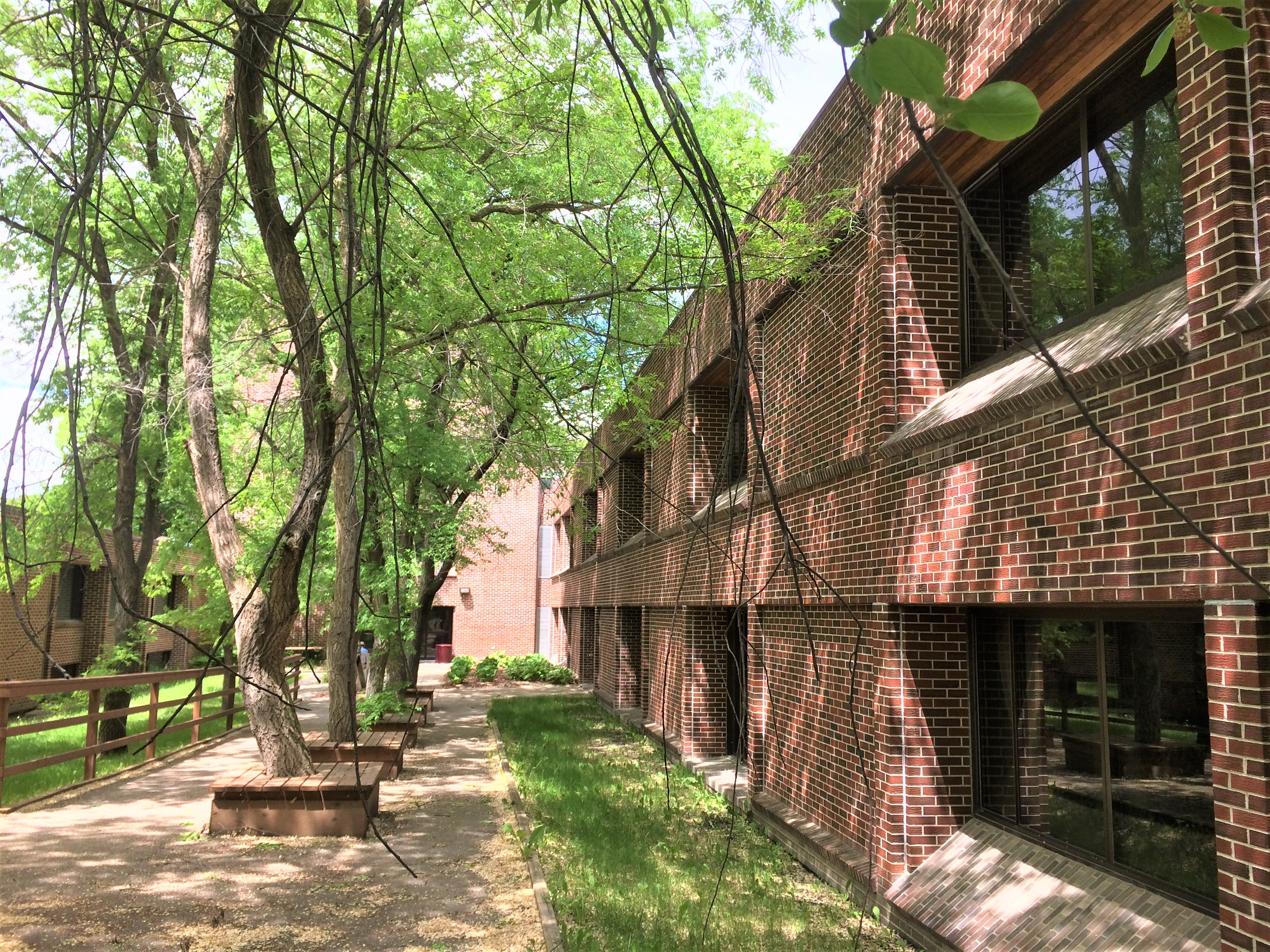
St. Amant Centre, 1972 (2)

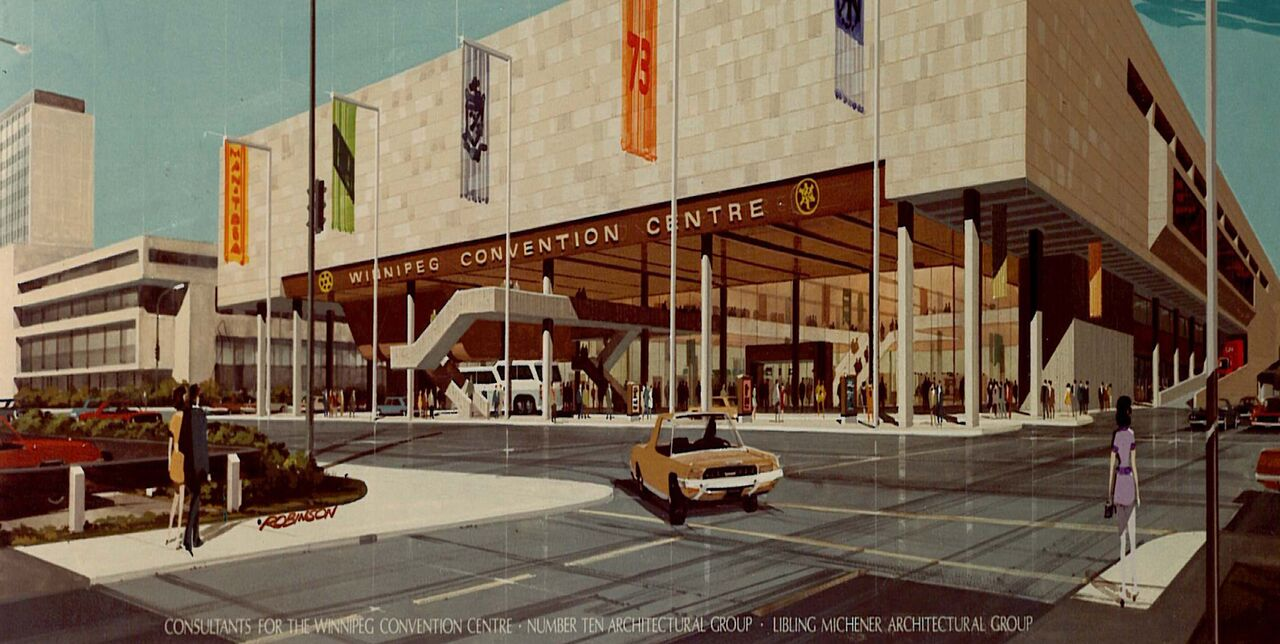
Winnipeg Convention Centre, 1974

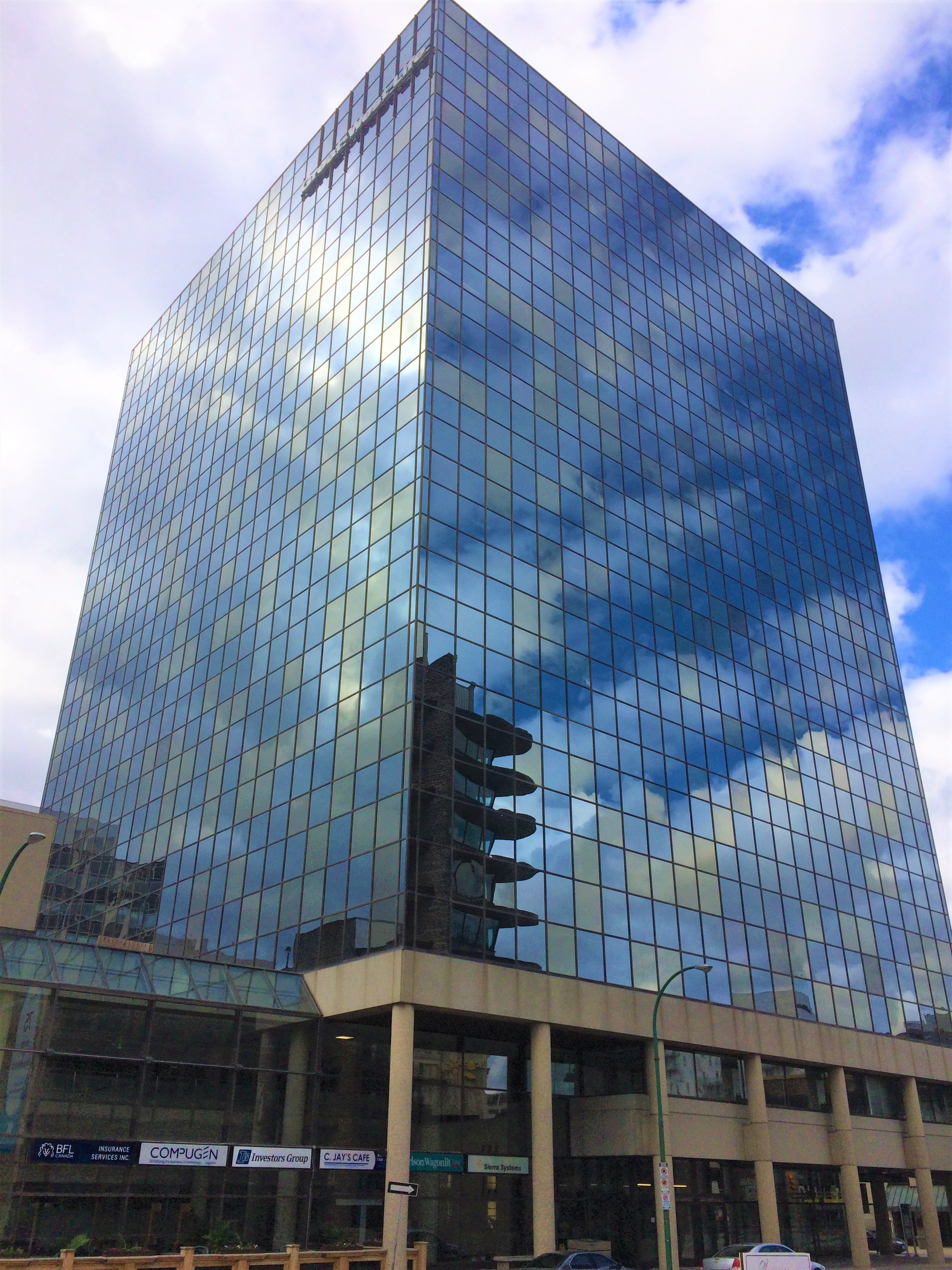
Rupertsland Square Complex, 1977

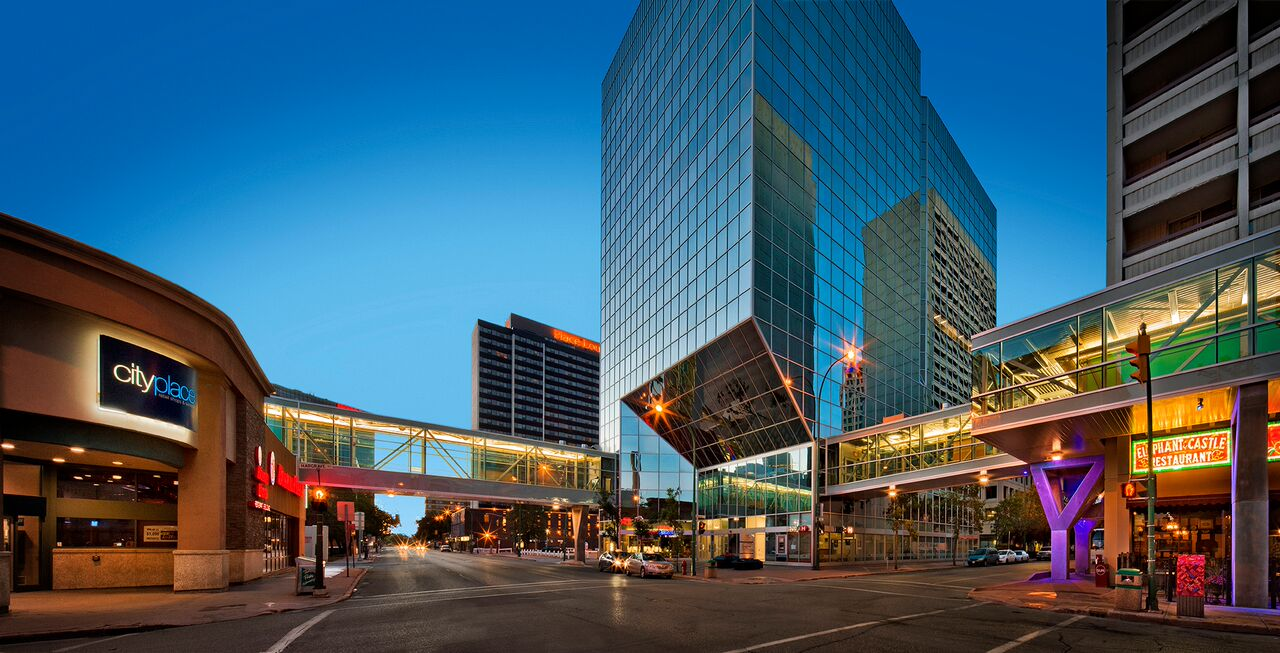
Royal Trust Tower, Winnipeg, 1981

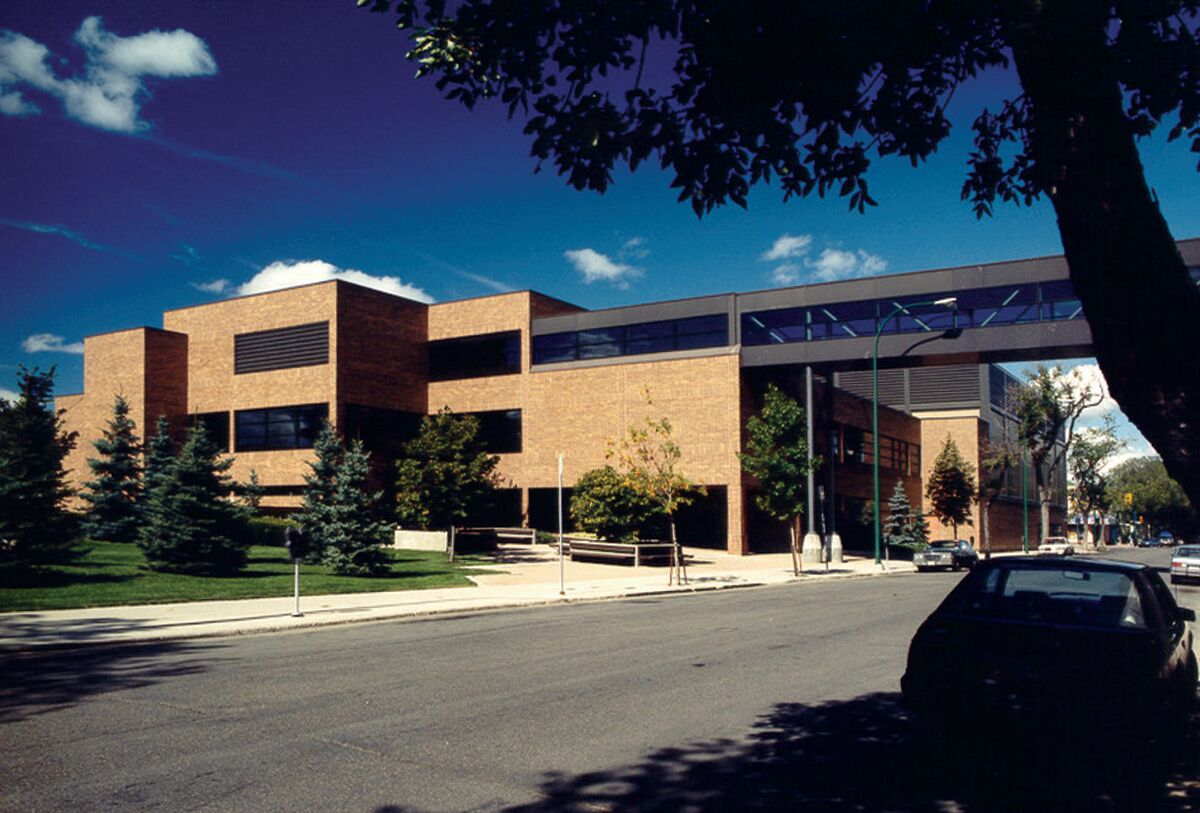
Duckworth Centre, University of Winnipeg, 1983

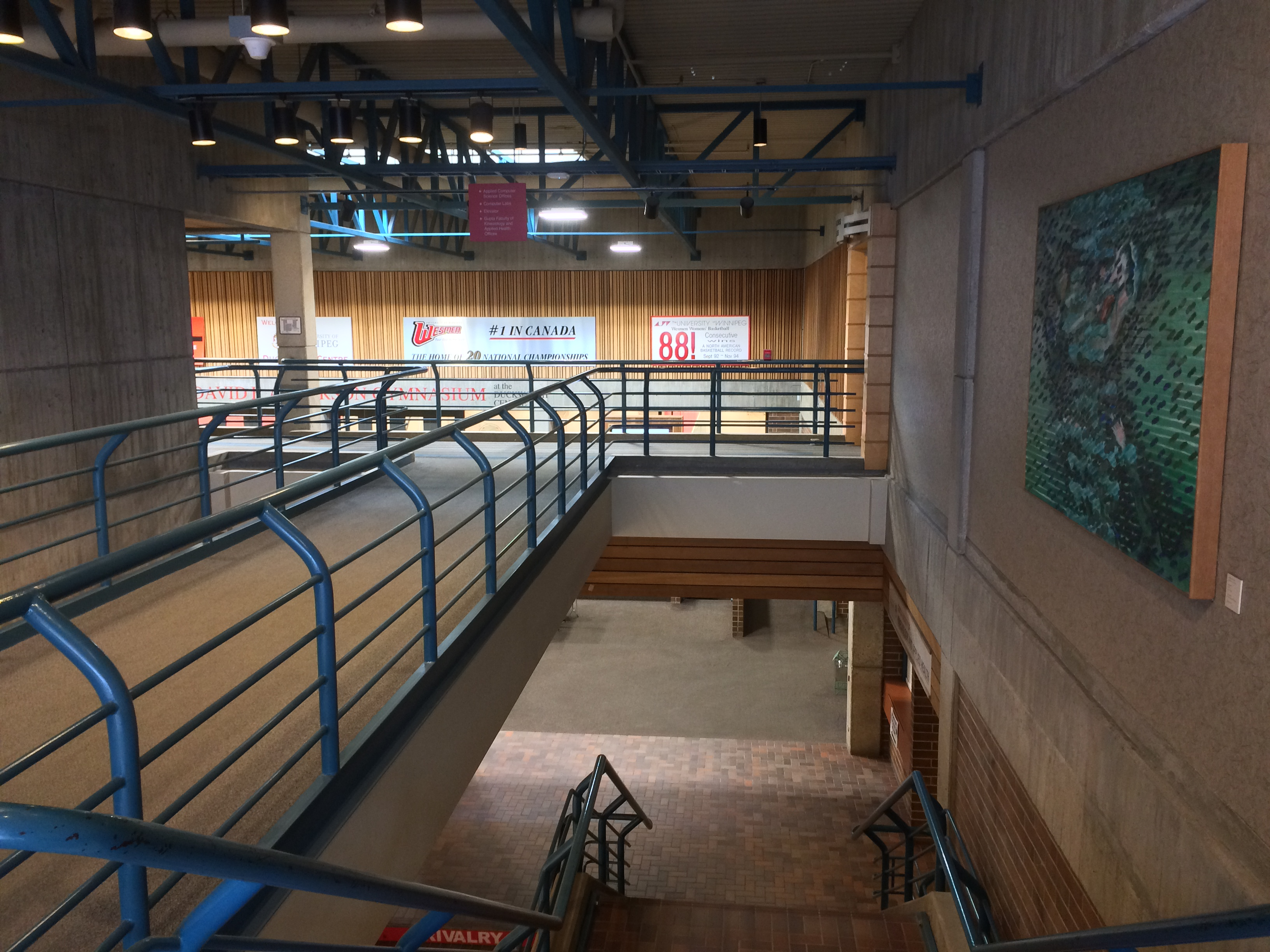
Duckworth Center, University of Winnipeg, 1983

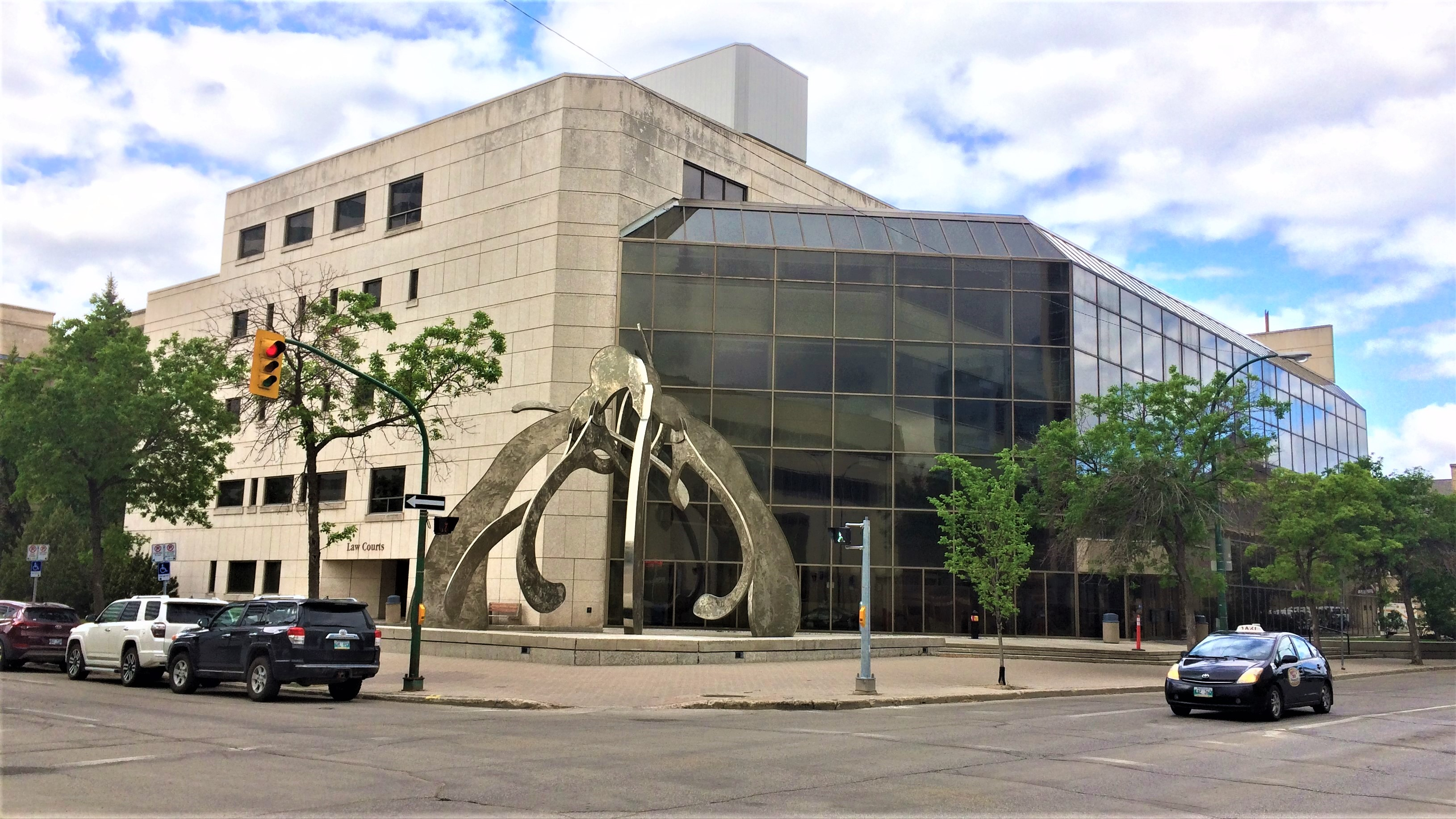
Manitoba Provincial Law Courts, 1985 (2)

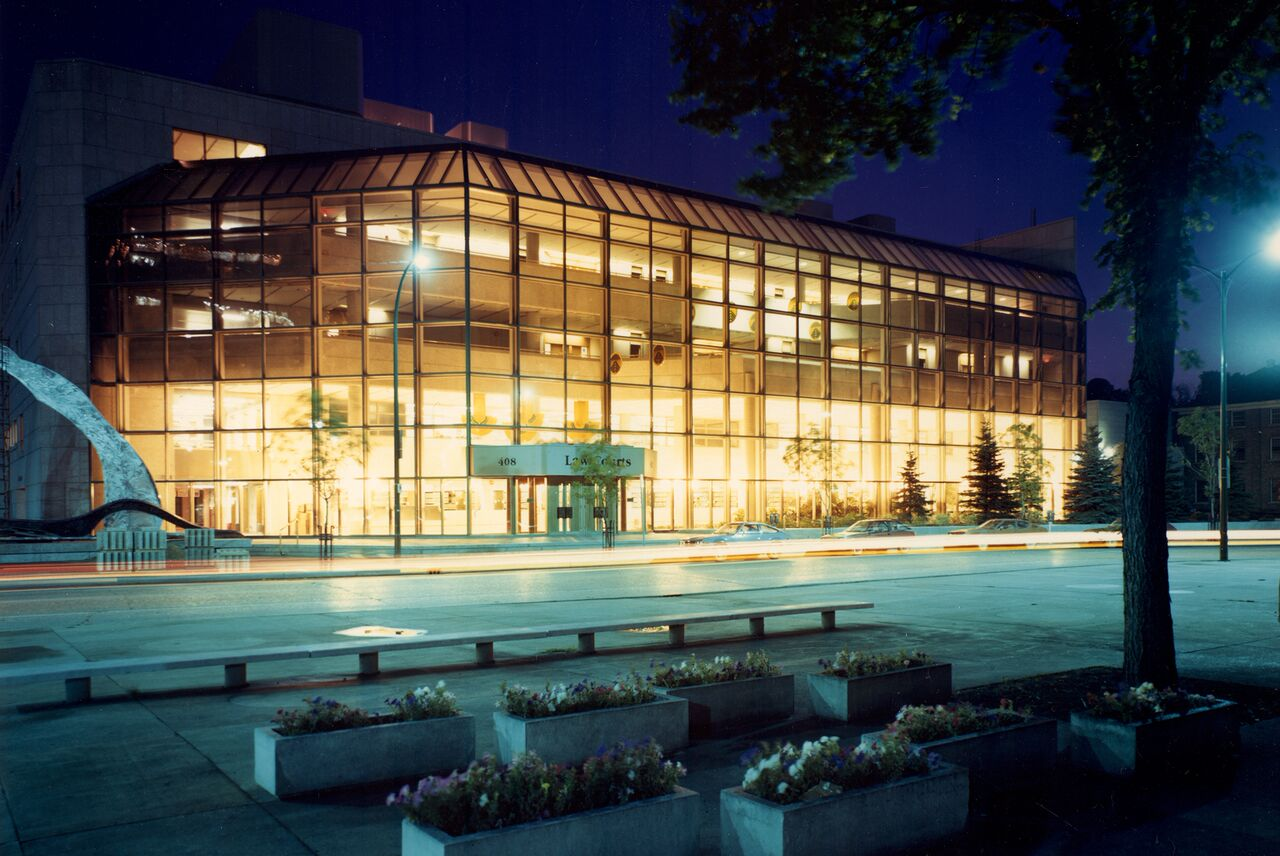
Manitoba Provincial Law Courts, 1985

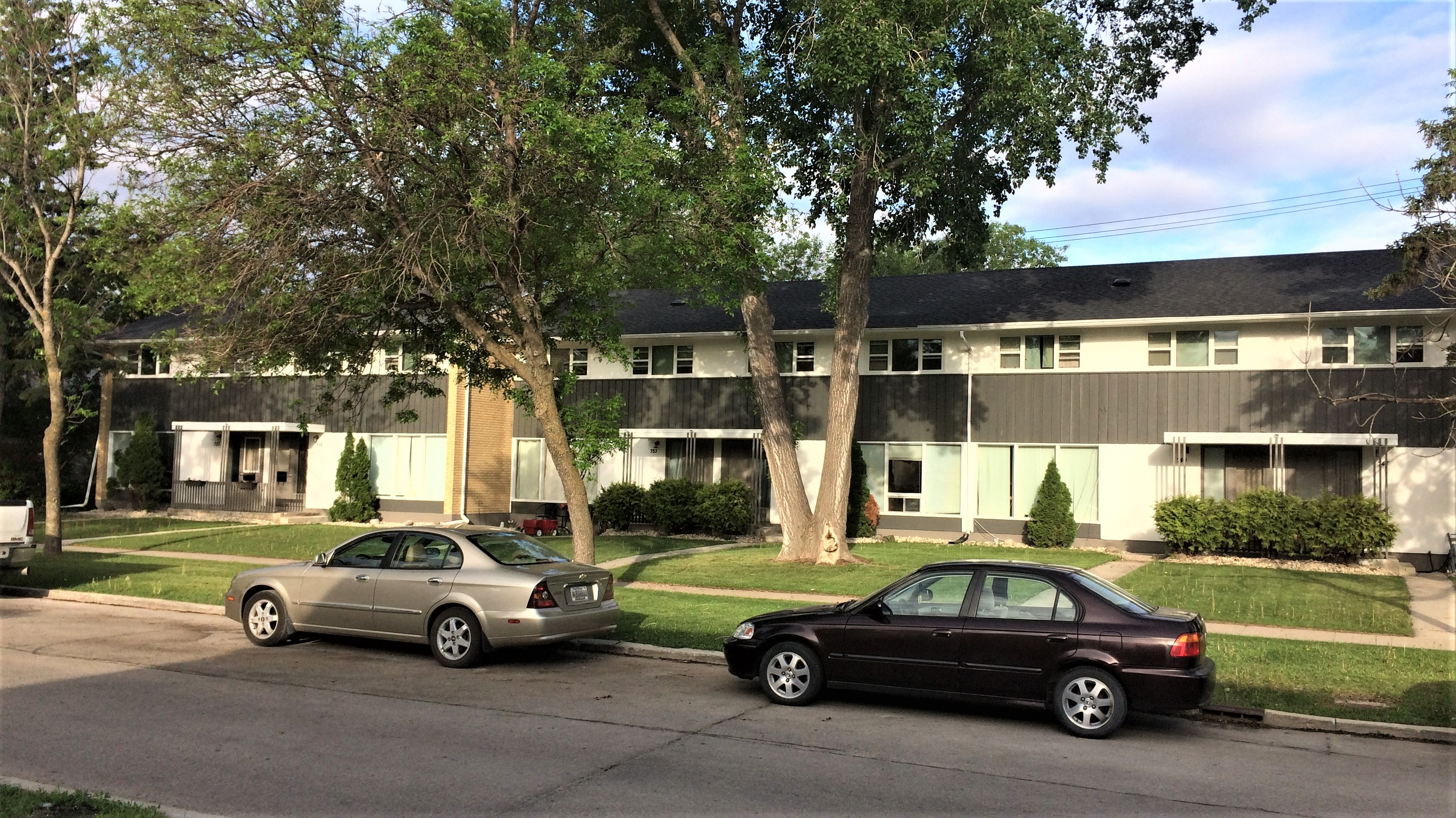
Row Housing at 745-757 Centennial Street, Winnipeg, 1959

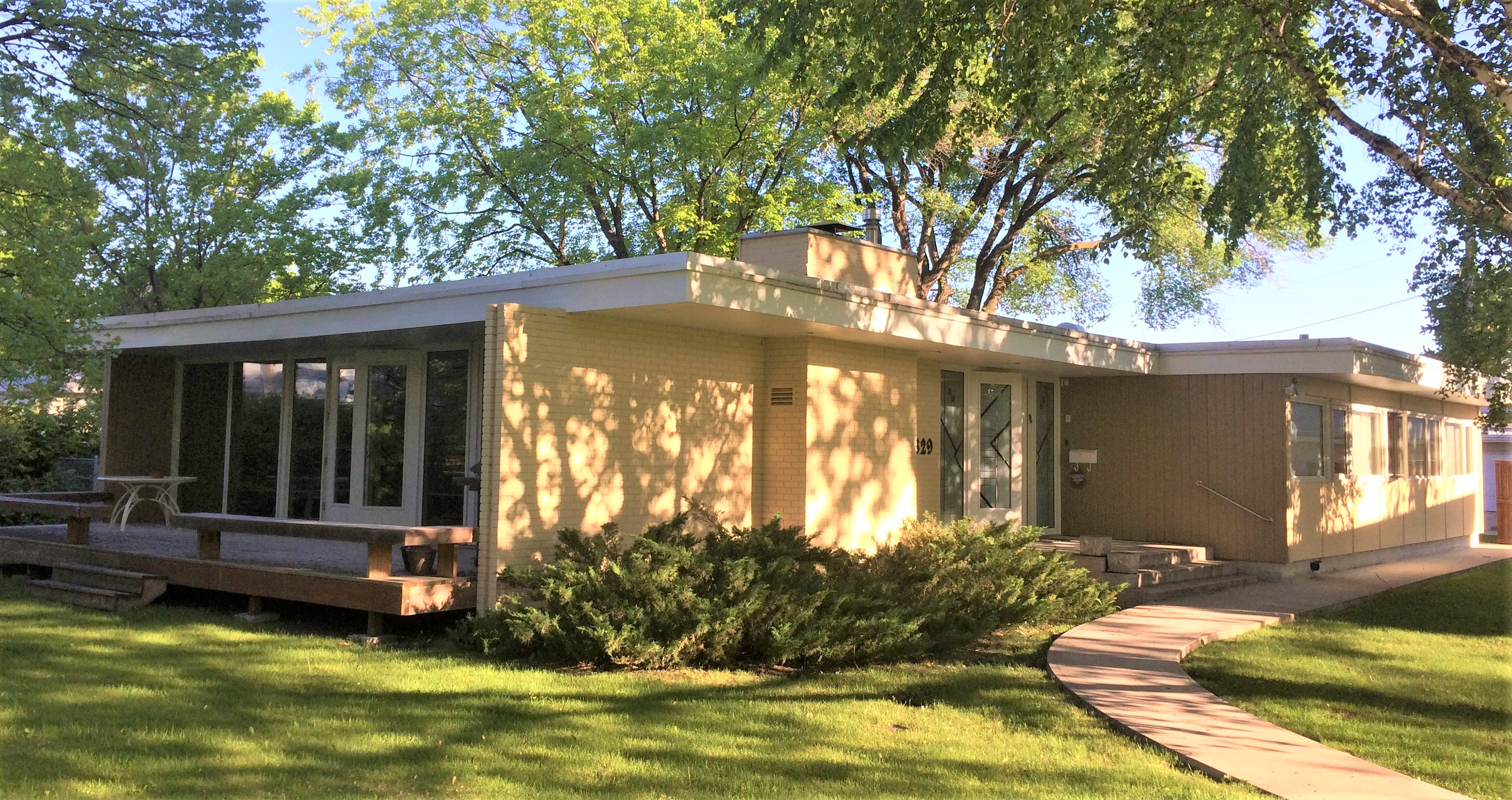
Private Residence, 829 Lanark Street, Winnipeg, 1958

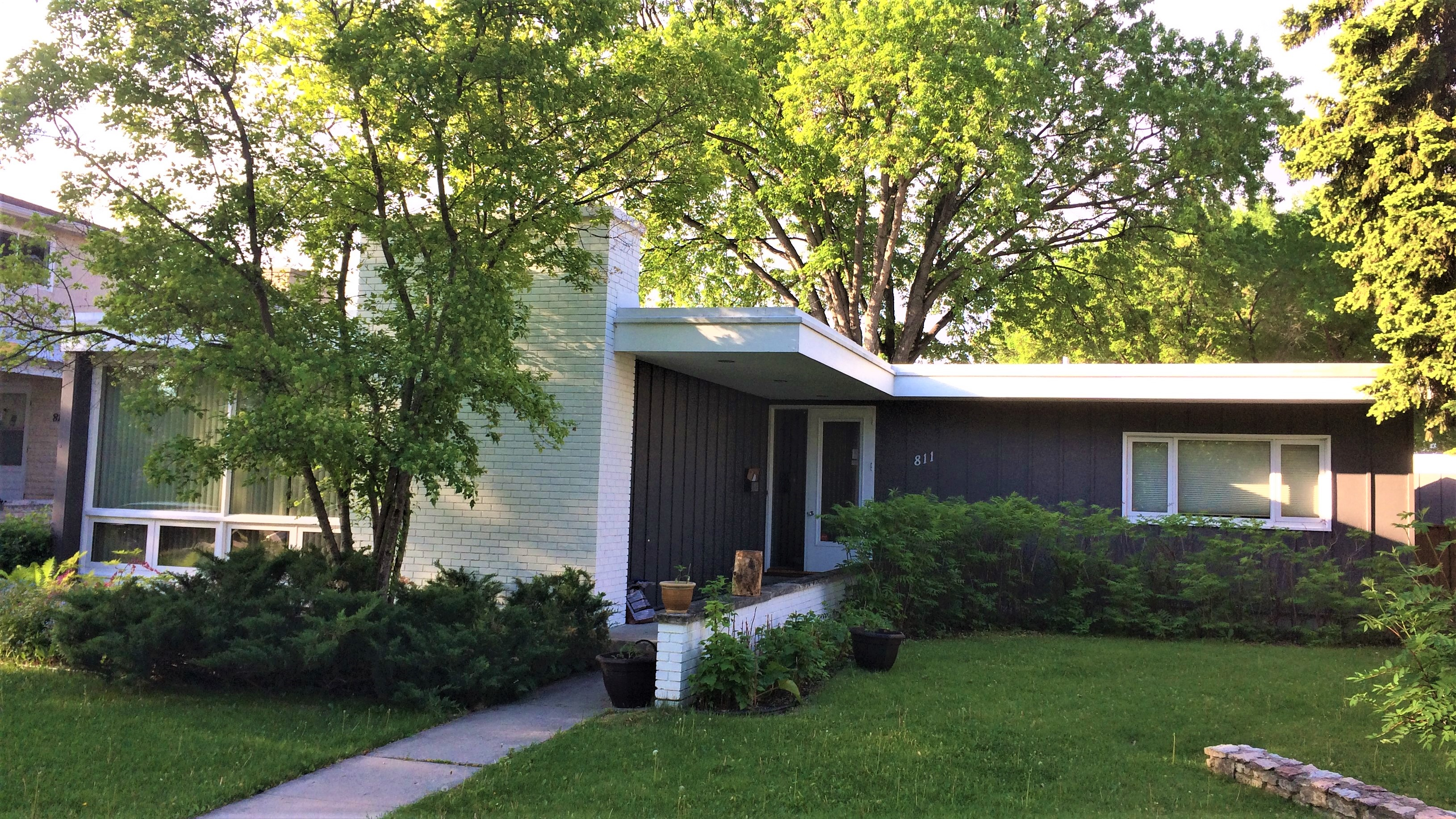
Private Residence, 811 Lanark Street, Winnipeg, 1959

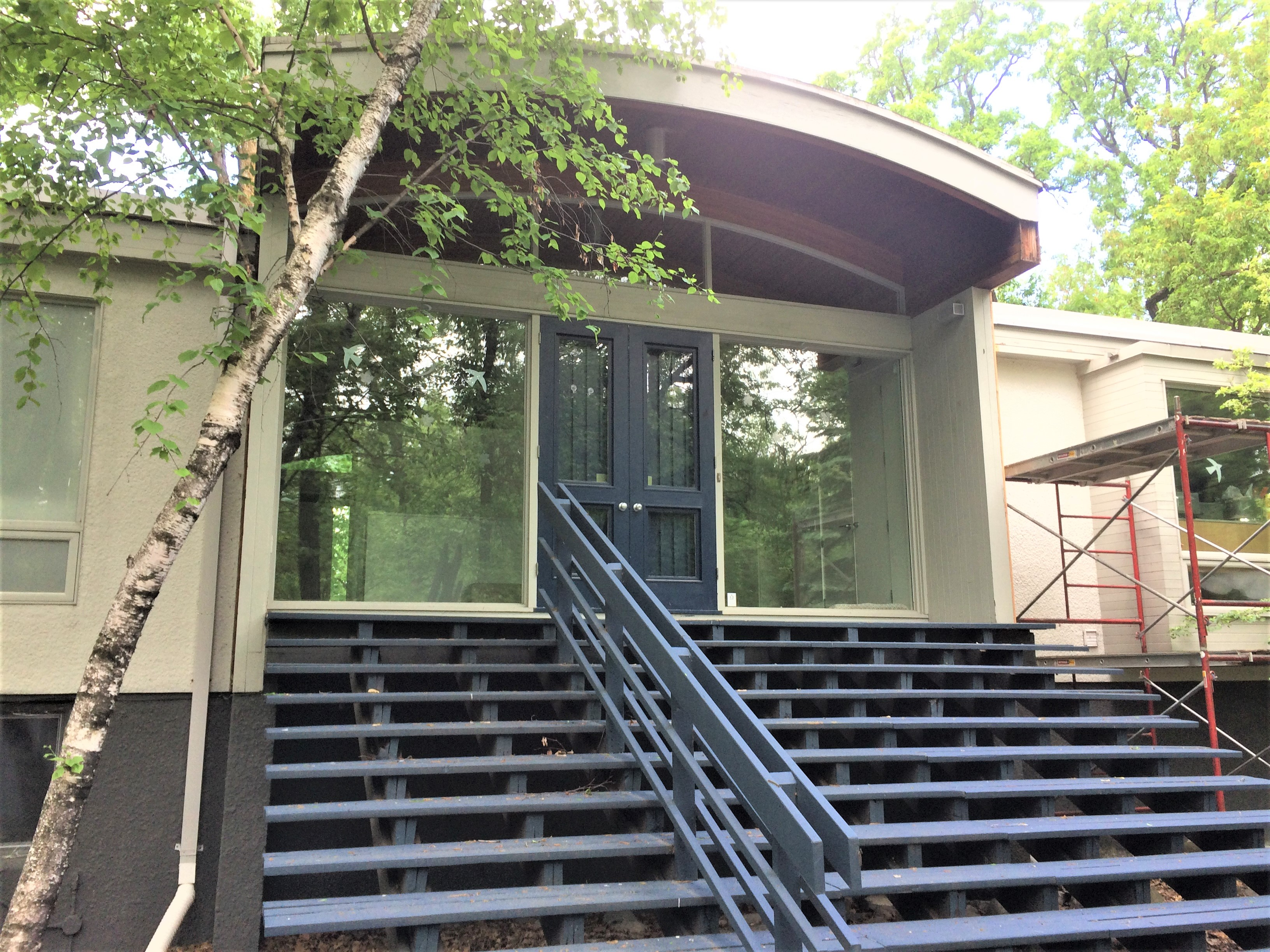
Private Residence, 512 South Drive, Winnipeg, 1967 (2)

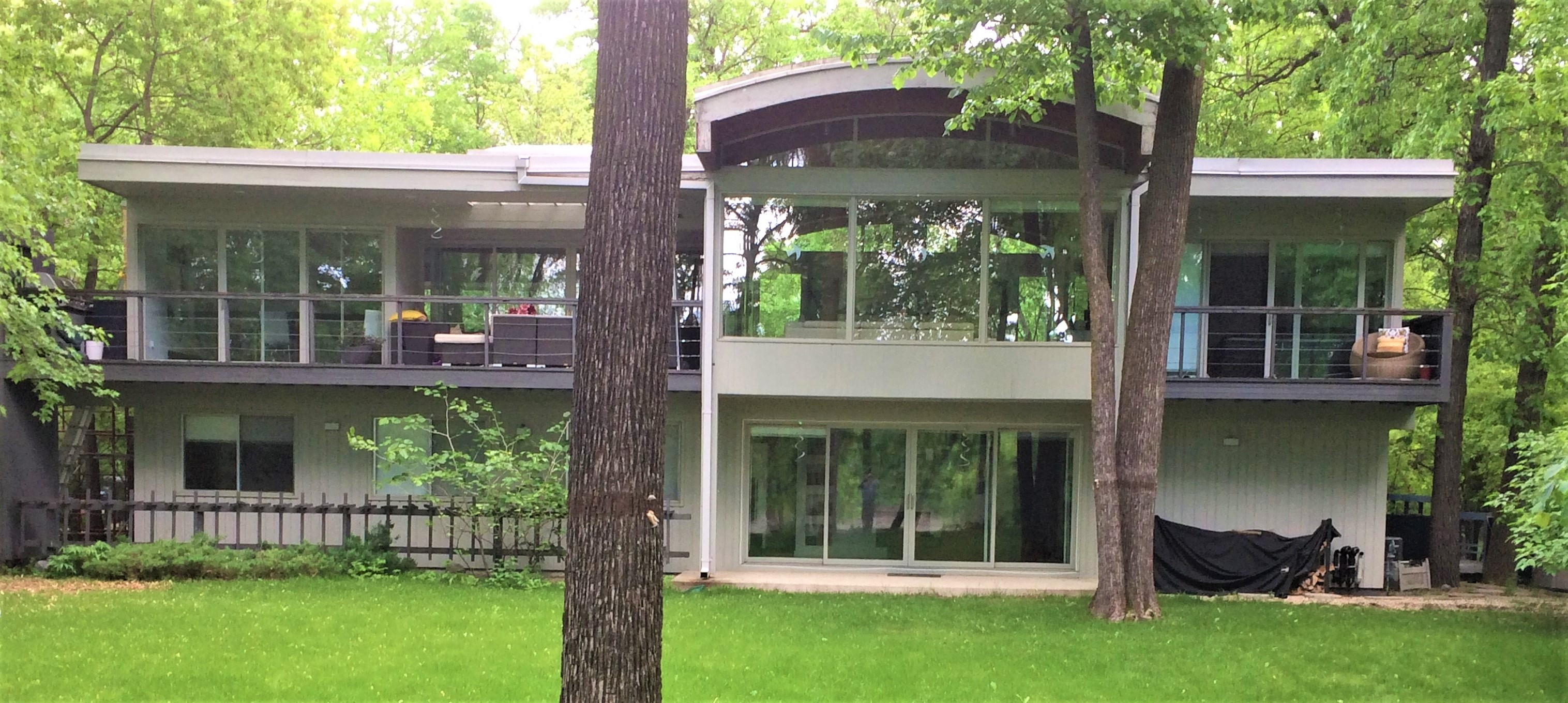
Private Residence, 512 South Drive, Winnipeg, 1967

== Bursary ==
The Isadore Coop Bursary in Architecture at the University of Manitoba, Faculty of Architecture, was created in remembrance of Coop's vision and values on the importance of supporting those in financial need. It is awarded each year to a student who shows promise of continued outstanding work in the Master of Architecture program and who has demonstrated financial need.
