= Anne Kahane =

Canadian artist (1924–2023)

- Born: March 1, 1924; Vienna, Austria
- Died: September 29, 2023 (aged 99)
- Education: École des Beaux-Arts, Montreal (night school) (1940); Valentine's School of Commercial Art (1942); Cooper Union, New York (1945–1947)
- Known for: Sculptor, teacher
- Spouse: Robert Langstadt
- Awards: International competition, London, 1953 for Unknown Political Prisoner; Concours artistique, Quebec, 1956; Canada Council grant 1961
- Elected: A.R.C.A., S.S.C.

Anne Kahane (March 1, 1924 – September 29, 2023) was an Austrian-born Canadian artist. Best known for her figures carved in wood, Kahane began her career as a printmaker and commercial artist. In addition to her work as a sculptor using wood, brass, and aluminum, Kahane's artistic repertoire also included drawing and printmaking.

== Early life ==
Kahane was born in Vienna, Austria on March 1, 1924. In 1925, she and her family moved to Canada, and settled in Montreal. In Montreal, Kahane attended high school at Strathcona Academy where no art course was taught. The absence of these studies influenced her to seek extra-curricular activities related to art.

Upon enrolling in night classes at the École des Beaux-Arts in Montreal (1940), she furthered her studies in traditional sculpture, commercial art, industrial design, and architecture. In the fall of 1942 Kahane began training as a commercial artist at Valentine's School of Commercial Art.

Kahane lived with her mother, using the home of her friends as studio space, and obtained planks of wood for her art from the local lumberyard. In 1945 she went to New York to study at the Cooper Union Art School. It was there that she discovered the art of woodcarving, the technique that would later shape her career.

== Career ==
In 1953, Kahane's maquette for The Unknown Political Prisoner Monument was the only Canadian entry to take a prize in the international sculpture competition organized by the Institute of Contemporary Arts of London, England. In the same year, Kahane had her first solo exhibition at the Galérie Agnès Lefort. She received no financial prize from her London competition, but as a result, in 1952, was asked to join the Sculptors Society of Canada. At the 1956 Concours Artistique de la province au Quebec, Kahane won the grand prize for her work Ball Game. As an associate member of the Royal Canadian Academy of Arts, Kahane exhibited with them between 1964 and 1976, and with the Art Association of Montreal from 1957 to 1965.

Kahane's work was internationally celebrated, representing Canada with James Wilson Morrice, Jacques de Tonnancour, and Jack Nichols at the Canadian Pavilion at the Venice Biennale (1958), at Expo 67 in Montreal and at the Brussels World's Fair (1968). She received public and private commissions, notably her sculpture for the Winnipeg airport (1963) and a piece for Montreal's Place des Arts (1963–1964).

Kahane taught fine arts at Concordia University from 1965 to 1980. Later, as a resident sculptor, she taught at McMaster University in Hamilton (1980–1982), where she explored flat structural techniques using flexible materials to depart from traditional three-dimensional structures.

Kahane died on September 29, 2023, at the age of 99.

== Legacy ==
The Anne Kahane: Structures exhibition at the Montreal Museum of Fine Arts (MMFA) in 2027 was the result of a major gift from the artist's estate to the MMFA in 2025. It included some 50 works "being shown for the first time at the Museum, including two complete series of prints and a selection of sculptures — the medium for which Kahane" was best known.

== Selected public exhibitions ==
- Sculpture by Anne Kahane, Galerie Agnès Lefort, Montreal, 1953
- International Sculpture Competition 'The Unknown Political Prisoner', National Gallery of Canada, Ottawa, 1952.
- XXIX Biennale D'Arte, Canadian Pavilion Venice, Italy, 1958
- 41st Pittsburgh International Exhibition of Painting and Sculpture. Carnegie Institute, Pittsburgh, Pennsylvania, 1958–1959
- A Trio of Canadian Sculptors, National Gallery of Canada, Ottawa, 1964–1966
- Royal Canadian Academy 84th Exhibition, National Gallery of Canada, Ottawa, 1964 and 1976
- 300 Years of Canadian Art, National Gallery of Canada, Ottawa, 1967
- 3-D into the 70s: Aspects of Sculpture, Art Gallery of Ontario, Toronto,1970
- Spectrum Canada, held in conjunction with the Montreal Olympics, 1979
- Artists Drawn to Wood, McMaster Museum of Art, 2011
- Anne Kahane: Structures, Montreal Museum of Fine Arts, 2027;

== Public artworks ==
- Mother and Child (1959) for Montreal's Rockland Plaza.
- Captain F.J. Stevenson for the Winnipeg International Airport (1963–1964)
- Chant de la Terre for Place des Arts in Montreal (1963)
- Man on His Head for Expo '67 in Montreal
- La Mer for the Canadian Embassy in Islamabad, Pakistan (1972–1973)
- The Forest for Environment Canada Forestry Service, Great Lakes Forest Research Centre (GLFRC), Sault Ste. Marie, Ontario (1975) for the official opening of the GLFRC, 25 April-1 May 1976.
