= Pakistani Canadians =

Community of Canadians of Pakistani descent or with Pakistani citizenship

Pakistani Canadians _{Canadiens d'origine pakistanais (French)}
Urdu: پاکستانی کینیڈین
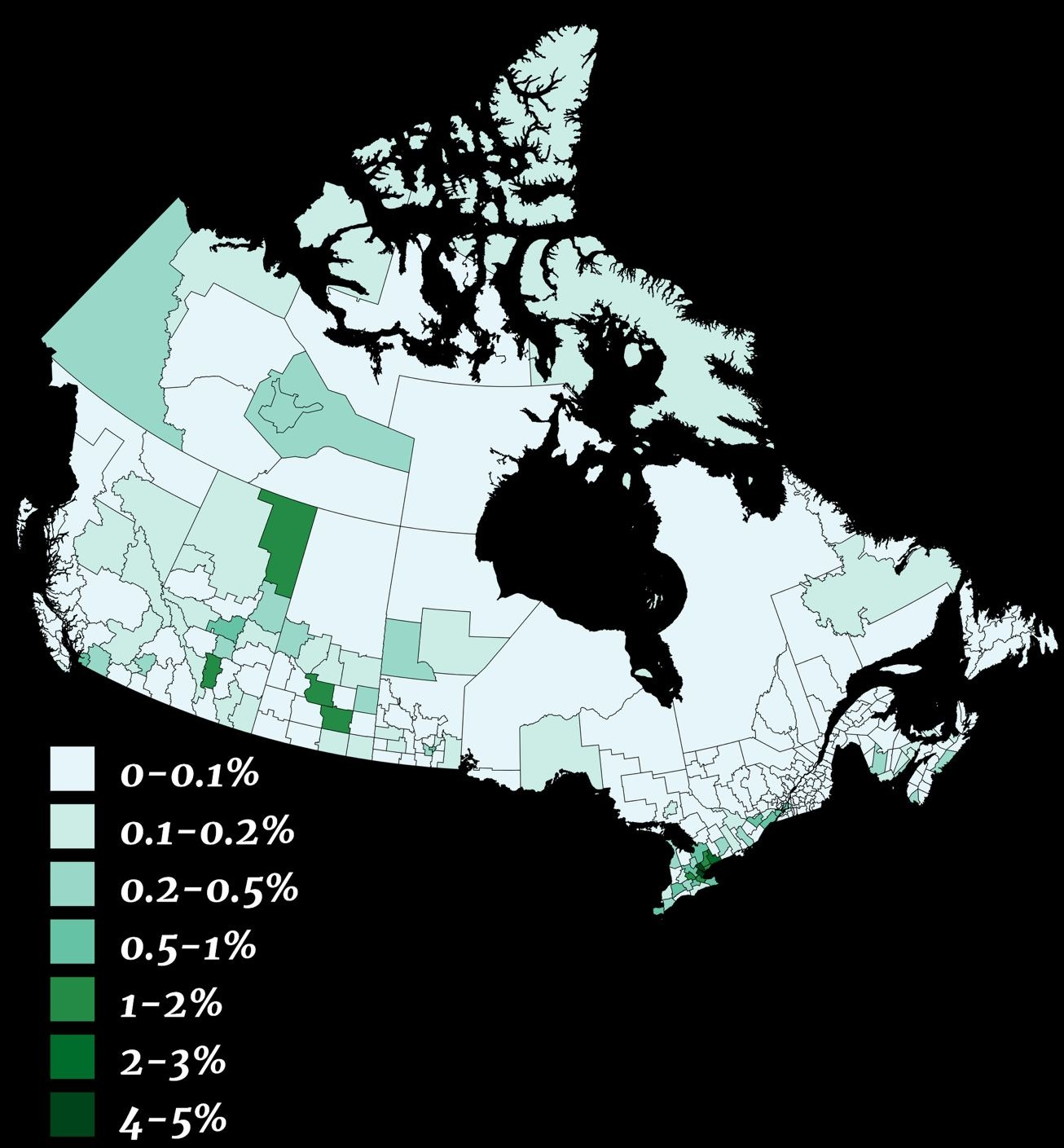
- Population distribution of Pakistani Canadians by census division, 2021 census

Total population
- 303,260 (0.81)

Regions with significant populations
- Ontario: 212,650
- Alberta: 39,535
- British Columbia: 19,050
- Quebec: 16,645

Languages
- L1: English, French; L2: Urdu, Punjabi, Pashto, Sindhi

Religion
- Majority: Sunni Islam; Minority: Shi'a Islam, Ahmadiyya, Hinduism, Sikhism, and Christianity

Related ethnic groups
- Pashtun Canadians, Pakistani diaspora, Muslim Canadians

Pakistani Canadian refers to the community in Canada of Pakistani heritage or descent. It can also refer to people who hold dual Pakistani and Canadian citizenship. Categorically, Pakistani Canadians comprise a subgroup of South Asian Canadians which is a further subgroup of Asian Canadians.

== Terminology ==
There is no official classification of Pakistani Canadians. However, they are usually defined by Asian or South Asian.

== History ==
Historical population
Year	Pop.	±%
2001	74,015	—
2006	124,730	+68.5%
2011	155,310	+24.5%
2016	215,555	+38.8%
2021	303,260	+40.7%

Punjabi people from the Punjab region that would later become Pakistan were among the pioneers who migrated from British India to British Columbia at the turn of the century. By 1905, as many as 200 participated in the building of that first community from modern-day Pakistan, which for a time had a small makeshift mosque in Vancouver. But most of these immigrants were sojourners rather than settlers, and they either returned to Pakistan in 1947 or moved on to the United States. Subsequently, Canada imposed a ban on South Asian immigration that remained in place until after World War II.

Pakistanis began migrating to Canada in small numbers in the late 1950s and early 1960s. Immigration regulations gave preference to those with advanced education and professional skills, and the Pakistanis who came during this period, and throughout the 1960s, generally had excellent credentials. Many of them considered themselves to be sojourners, who had come to earn but not to settle or were students who intended to return home when their degree programs were completed. While some went back, others remained to become the founding members of the Pakistani-Canadian community.

Pakistani nationals were registered in undergraduate and graduate programs at McGill University in Montreal as early as 1949, and at the University of Toronto from 1958 on. By the mid-1950s, there were five or six Pakistani families living in Montreal in addition to the students. This was probably the then largest concentration of Pakistanis in the country. Throughout the 1950s, 1960s and 1970s most who arrived were young men pursuing graduate or professional studies.

Pakistanis have integrated well into Canadian society, partly due to the Canadian Government's policies and assistance given to all immigrants settling in the country.

== Demography ==
=== Religion ===
Most Pakistani Canadians are Muslims. Religion figures prominently in the lives of Pakistani Canadian families. The majority of Pakistanis belong to the Sunni sect of Islam; Pakistani Canadians also participate in and contribute to the larger Islamic community, which includes Arab Canadians, Iranian Canadians, Turkish Canadians, and Asian Canadians.

Pakistani Canadian demography by religion
Religious group	2021 (Note: Religious breakdown proportions based on "Pakistani" ethnic or cultural origin response on the 2021 census.)		2001 (Note: Religious breakdown proportions based on "Pakistani" ethnic or cultural origin response on the 2001 census.)	
Religious group	Pop.	%	Pop.	%
Islam	276,870	91.3%	66,275	89.54%
Christianity	11,145	3.68%	4,650	6.28%
Irreligion	10,875	3.59%	1,515	2.05%
Sikhism	2,170	0.72%	480	0.65%
Hinduism	1,410	0.46%	645	0.87%
Judaism	90	0.03%	25	0.03%
Buddhism	65	0.02%	70	0.09%
Indigenous spirituality	30	0.01%	—N/a	—N/a
Other	610	0.2%	355	0.48%
Total Pakistani Canadian population	303,260	100%	74,015	100%

Pakistani Canadian demography by Christian sects
Religious group	2021		2001	
Religious group	Pop.	%	Pop.	%
Catholic	5,680	50.96%	2,895	62.26%
Orthodox	110	0.99%	55	1.18%
Protestant	1,645	14.76%	995	21.4%
Other Christian	3,710	33.29%	705	15.16%
Total Pakistani Canadian christian population	11,145	100%	4,650	100%

Islamic Pakistani Canadians have played important roles in many organizations, including:

- Anjuman Burhani – Dawoodi Bohra Muslim Community
- Canadian Islamic Congress
- Canadian Shia Muslim Organization
- Islamic Society of North America
- Muslim Association of Canada
- Muslim Canadian Congress
- Muslim Student Association of Canada

=== Language ===
Most Pakistani Canadians speak English or French. However, many also speak a second or third language, as they often tend to keep hold of their native tongues, which includes Urdu, Punjabi.

== Geographical distribution ==
=== Provinces ===
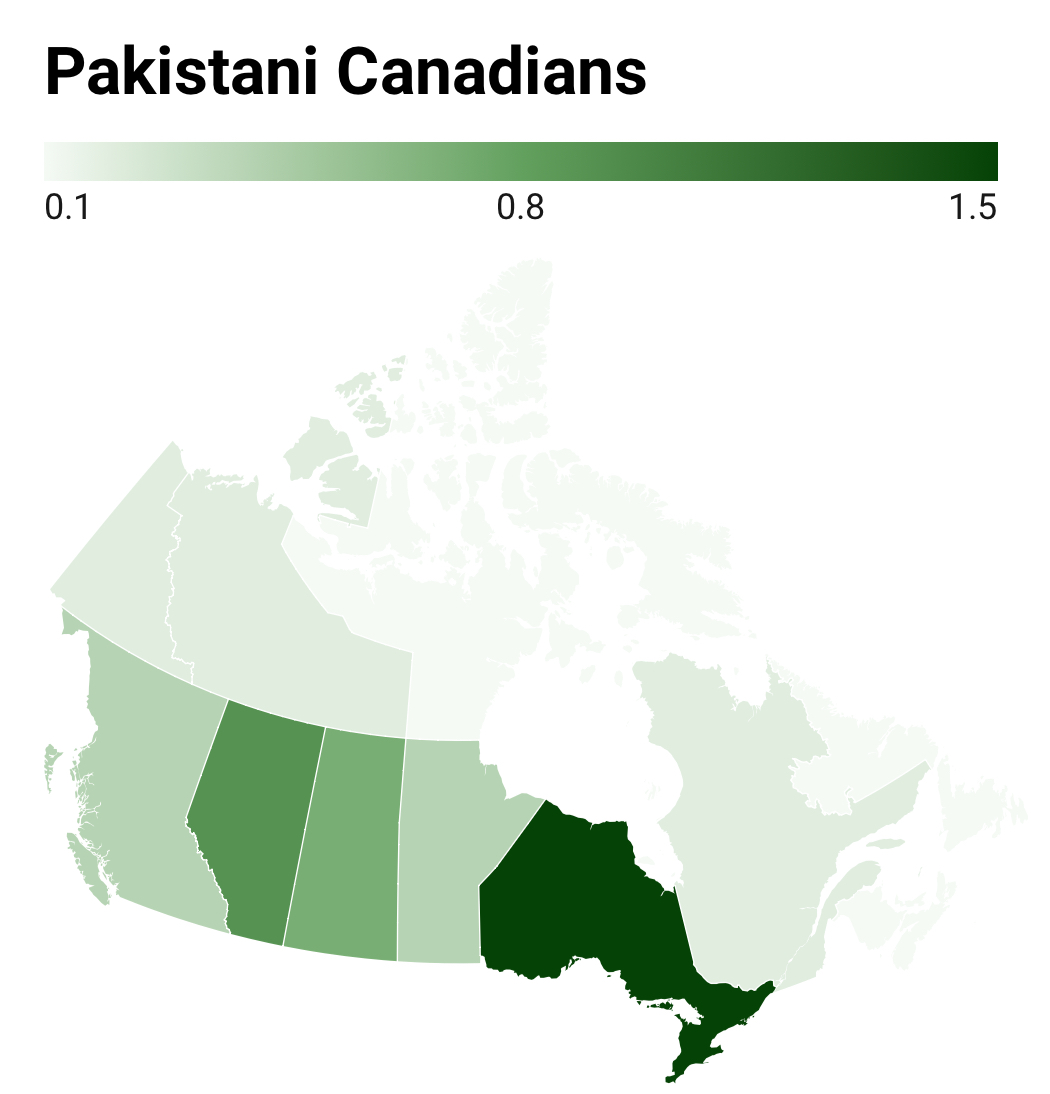
Pakistani percent in Canada by province/territory, 2021 census

Provinces With Significant Population of Pakistani Canadians (2001 - 2021)
Province	2001	2011	2021
Ontario	52,830	109,295	212,650
Alberta	5,450	17,825	39,535
Quebec	7,990	12,470	16,645
British Columbia	6,270	9,770	19,050
Saskatchewan	495	3,195	7,640
Manitoba	565	1,810	5,030
Nova Scotia	305	490	1,285

Figures from the 2021 Canadian Census from StatsCan indicate that there are 303,260 Canadians who claim Pakistani ancestry.

=== Metropolitan Areas ===
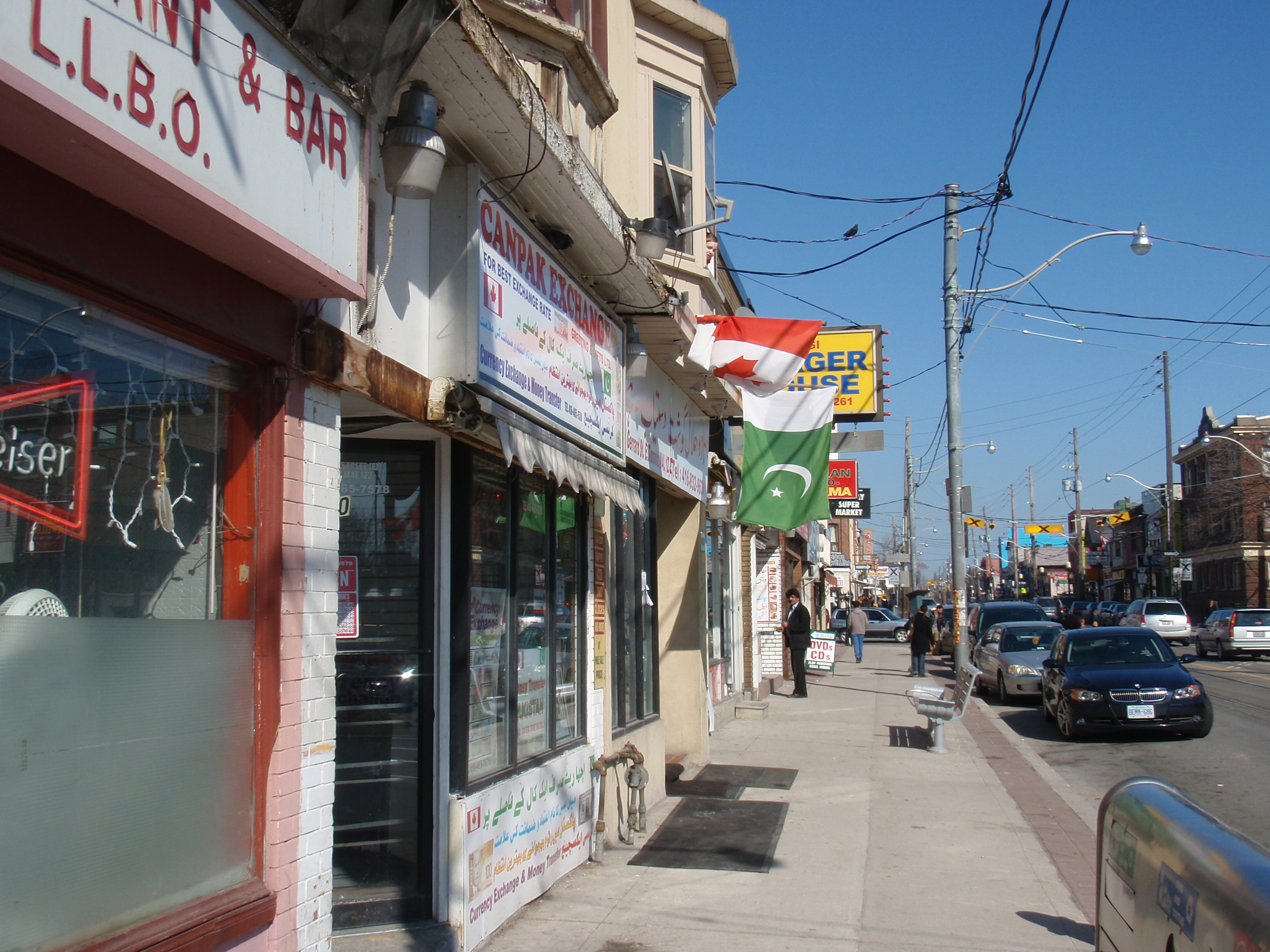
Toronto’s Gerrard St. East, also known as Little Pakistan

Metro Regions With Significant Population of Pakistani Canadians (2001 - 2021)
City	2001	2011	2021
(Ontario) Toronto	43,035	90,610	162,710
(Alberta) Calgary	3,455	10,450	24,050
(Quebec) Montreal	7,890	12,220	16,060
(British Columbia) Vancouver	5,680	8,865	15,765
(Alberta) Edmonton	1,745	5,480	12,765
(Ontario) Hamilton	2,055	3,705	8,820
(Ontario) Ottawa	2,255	3,910	7,885
(Ontario) Kitchener-Cambridge Waterloo	1,045	3,210	8,015
(Saskatchewan) Saskatoon	255	1,705	4,150
(Manitoba) Winnipeg	560	1,590	4,660
(Ontario) Oshawa	480	1,225	6,965
(Saskatchewan) Regina	220	1,330	2,940
(Ontario) London	665	1,010	3,850

=== Local municipalities ===
There were 162,710 Pakistani-Canadians in the Greater Toronto Area per the 2021 Census, making it home to one of the largest Pakistani diaspora communities in North America. Per the 2021 Census, there were 41,705 Pakistani-Canadians residing within the actual city of Toronto; the majority of the community is concentrated throughout the suburbs of the GTA.

There are 41,025 Pakistani-Canadians residing in Mississauga per the 2021 Census, comprising 5.76% of the city's population. This is up from 27,345 recorded in the 2011 Census. Urdu is the 2nd most common reported mother tongue after English, and there are 55,765 speakers in Mississauga.

Pakistani-Canadians made up 3.81% of the population of Milton in 2011, per the 2021 census this number has tripled to 12.88%, making it one of the fastest growing Pakistani communities in the nation. Urdu is the 2nd most common reported mother tongue, with 19,830 speakers per the 2021 Census.

There are 10,825 Pakistani Canadians living in Metro Vancouver per the 2016 Census. Most Pakistanis who live in Metro Vancouver reside in areas such as Surrey, which has 5,565 Pakistani Canadian residents per the 2016 Census.

== Culture ==
=== Lifestyle and economics ===
Many Pakistanis have used an adaptation technique, and are accustomed to a bicultural lifestyle. At home they live as traditional a life as possible. The old values and hierarchical decision-making patterns are generally respected, and traditional clothing, food, decorations, and language provide the warmth and reassurance of the familiar. Pakistani Canadians who are members of the community believe in the symbolic importance of owning homes. Those who came to Canada from Pakistan via East Africa or the Gulf are more likely to be involved in business. A number of Pakistani Canadians are also traders and are primarily involved in exporting and importing goods to and from Pakistan. A number of Pakistani-Canadian businessmen and companies have participated in this development.

An important aspect of Pakistani participation in the Canadian economy has been the increasing number of Pakistani-Canadian women who work outside the home. The experience of Pakistani-Canadian women varies, from educated women with large social and economic freedom, to those separated in the community from traditional gender roles. Still, Pakistanis have shifted towards more freedom for Pakistani-Canadian women, including later marriages, more liberal attire, and greater social and economic freedom.

Young people who were born in Canada or brought as children share a particular set of issues and concerns with their parents and the wider Pakistani-Canadian community. Their perspective regarding adaptation and integration is generally not informed by significant direct experience of the culture and values of the homeland, and, as a result, parents and grandparents take on a mediating role. They have to decide what aspects of their traditional lifestyle and values must be left behind and what can be transferred to and re-established in their new home. Most significantly, they generally assume the responsibility for making these choices for their children as well. The family – even in its truncated form in the diaspora – is both the base for substantial cultural transfer and the source of intergenerational conflict.

=== Community and media ===
The Toronto Pakistan Day Event is a small scale event held on Pakistan Day to celebrate Pakistani culture. A number of Canadian television networks broadcast programming that features Pakistani-Canadian culture. These television shows often highlight Pakistani-Canadian events in Canada, and also show events from Pakistan involving Pakistanis who reside there, for example, The Voice of Pakistan – Vision TV (since 1971).

== Relations with Pakistan ==
Pakistan International Airlines serves Toronto's Lester B. Pearson International Airport three times a week non-stop to Karachi, Lahore and Islamabad and has been one of the most profitable routes in the entire network.

== Politics ==
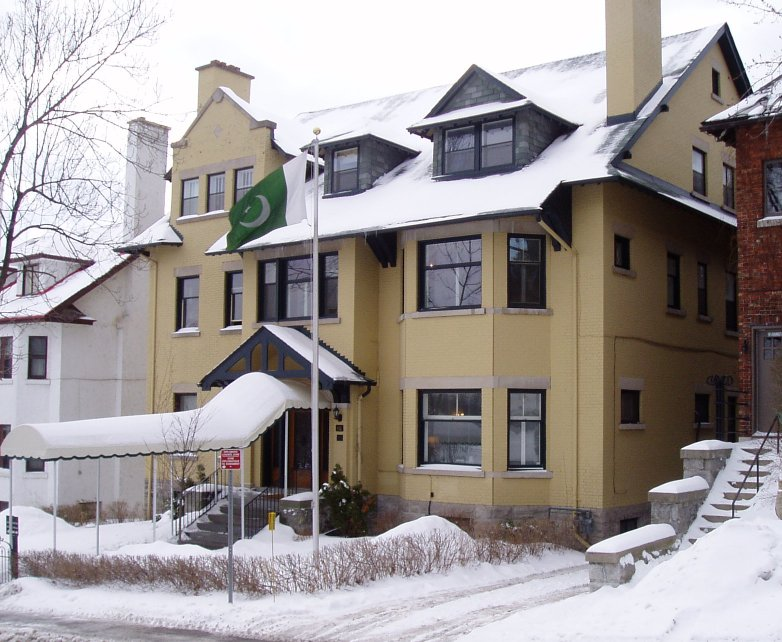
Embassy of Pakistan in Ottawa

== Canadians of Pakistani origin ==
Wajid Khan and Rahim Jaffer were members of the House of Commons of Canada. Wajid Khan represented the riding of Mississauga—Streetsville district of Ontario as a Conservative Member of Parliament while Rahim Jaffer was a Conservative Member of Parliament for the Edmonton—Strathcona district of Alberta. Currently there are two Pakistani-Canadian women serving in the 42nd Canadian Parliament: Iqra Khalid representing Mississauga-Erin Mills and Salma Zahid representing Scarborough Centre. Both women are Liberal Members of Parliament elected to seats in Ontario. Pakistani Canadians can also be found in the provincial legislatures as well as on municipal councils.

Salma Ataullahjan, a Toronto artist and community activist, was named a Canadian Senator by Governor General Michaëlle Jean, on the advice of Prime Minister Stephen Harper, on 9 July 2010, and will sit with the Conservative caucus. With this appointment, Ataullahjan became the first Canadian senator of Pakistani Pushtun descent.

Shafiq Qaadri is a family doctor and politician in Ontario, Canada. He was a member of the Legislative Assembly of Ontario, representing the riding of Etobicoke North for the Ontario Liberal Party.

== See also ==
- Canada–Pakistan relations
- Canadians in Pakistan
- Asian Canadians
- Islam in Canada
- High Commission of Pakistan in Ottawa
- Pakistani diaspora
- Pakistanis
- Pakistani Americans
- Languages of Pakistan
