= Canada–Pakistan relations =

- Pakistan: Canada

Diplomatic mission
- High Commission of Pakistan, Ottawa: High Commission of Canada, Islamabad

Envoy
- High Commissioner of Pakistan to Canada Zaheer Aslam Janjua: High Commissioner of Canada to Pakistan Leslie Scanlon

Canada–Pakistan relations refer to the diplomatic relations between Canada and Pakistan. Canada is primarily represented in Pakistan by a high commission in Islamabad while maintaining consulates in Lahore and Karachi, as well as a trade office in the latter city. Pakistan is represented in Canada by a high commission in Ottawa and consulates in Toronto, Vancouver and Montreal. Both nations are credited on the international stage with significant contributions to United Nations (UN) peacekeeping and are members of the Commonwealth of Nations, owing to their shared history as colonies of the former British Empire. The relationship between the two countries has generally been cordial, with Canadian Governor-General Roméo LeBlanc making a state visit to Pakistan in 1998. However, relations saw a major negative impact that same year after Pakistan conducted nuclear weapons tests (codenamed Chagai-I) and became an officially declared nuclear weapons state in late May—becoming the 7th country in the world to acquire nuclear weapons technology immediately after India's tests (codenamed Pokhran-II) earlier that month. Canada, along with many other nations, immediately condemned the acquisition of nuclear weapons by both nations, and imposed full sanctions on both India and Pakistan. Relations normalized in the following years and bilateral trade between the two nations stood at C$1.04 billion in 2017. Canada has recognized Pakistan's significance as an important player and major non-NATO ally with regard to combating terrorism globally as well as domestically with the Afghanistan conflict and its spillover into Pakistan. Canada was also among the nations that deployed peacekeepers to the disputed region of Kashmir in 1949, shortly after the Indo-Pakistani War of 1947–1948, and has since strongly advocated for a peaceful solution to the India–Pakistan conflict over Kashmir. Today, Canada is home to one of the largest Pakistani diasporas, with population figures for the Pakistani Canadian community speculated to be at least 215,000 while there are some 30,000–50,000 Canadians in Pakistan.

== History ==
Canada established bilateral relations with the Dominion of Pakistan shortly after the latter's independence from British rule in 1947. Pakistan's founder Muhammad Ali Jinnah attended the state reception of the Dominion Day on 1 July 1948, which was held in Karachi by the Canadian trade commissioner. During the First Kashmir War between Pakistan and India in 1947–1948, Canada strongly expressed the desire for a rapid and peaceful solution to the conflict and was also one of the first few countries to provide United Nations peacekeeping in the volatile region of Kashmir as early as 1949.

Throughout Pakistan's history and wars with neighbouring India, Canada has expressed its concern with regard to the stability of the region and repeatedly urged restraint and diplomatic discussion to resolve the Kashmir conflict. Canada is committed to the peacekeeping in the India-Pakistan region.

== Modern bilateral relations ==
Canada considers Pakistan an important player and helper in the war against terrorism in the region. The two countries continue to exchange intelligence on essential matters.

In the early 2010s, a contingent of the Royal Canadian Mounted Police (RCMP) were deployed on an international peacekeeping operation to Haiti where they were joined and protected by the Sindh Rangers subdivision of the Pakistan Rangers from whom they and their offices received armed protection from.

== Migration ==
Migration to Canada from Pakistan has a long history and began as far back when the region was still under British rule. Figures from the 2006 Canadian Census from StatsCan indicate that there are about 124,000 Canadians who claim Pakistani ancestry

== See also ==
- Pakistani Canadian

== Bibliography ==
- Wolpert, Stanley (1984). Jinnah of Pakistan. New York: Oxford University Press. ISBN 978-0-19-503412-7.
