= Jack Nichols (painter) =

Canadian artist (1921–2009)

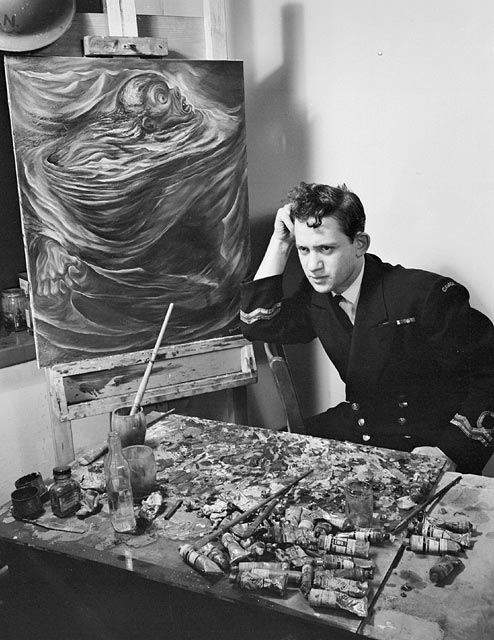
- Jack Nichols, war artist, circa 1945.
- Born: March 16, 1921; Montreal, PQ
- Died: 2009
- Education: largely self-taught

Jack Nichols RCA (1921–2009) was a Canadian artist from Montreal, Quebec. He was a painter and printmaker whose main interest in his art was people in the metropolitan scene. He was called by critics "a chronicler of the human condition" and compassionate in his depictions.

== Career ==
Jack Nichols was born in Montreal March 16, 1921. During the Depression, since his parents were dead, Nichols had to leave school at 14 years of age and work at various jobs. He was largely self-taught as an artist but studied for a time with Louis Muhlstock. From 1931 to 1939, he lived in Ottawa where he was instructed in drawing by F.H. Varley who was in the city as a teacher at the Ottawa Art Association (1936–1940). By 1940, Nichols was in Toronto, showing his work in 1941 in a solo show at the Picture Loan Society, then, again in a solo show, in 1942 at Hart House. For a few summers during the early 1940s, he worked as a deckhand on Great Lakes cargo boats. In 1943, the National Gallery of Canada commissioned him to depict the activities of the Canadian Merchant Navy with Michael Forster.

He enlisted in the Royal Canadian Navy in February 1944 and worked as an Official War Artist aboard the H.M.C.S. Iroquois and other ships from April 1944 to August 1945. Most of his works depict the landing operations at Normandy and destroyer movements off Brest. His drawings of these subjects are in the collection of Canadian War Museum. In August 1944, Nichols saw a man drown while he was on board HMCS Iroquois during the attempted evacuation of Brest, France, by the Germans. The image seared itself on his memory, and he completed the painting Drowning Sailor in Ottawa more than a year later, in 1946. In 1947, a Guggenheim Fellowship enabled him to study print-making and work with muralists in the United States. Afterwards, he went to Mexico where he studied the application of synthetic resins to art work at the National Polytechnical School in Mexico City.

In 1955, he completed his large mural for the Salvation Army headquarters building designed by the Parkin architectural firm in Toronto. In 1960, he did designs for the costumes, paintings and drawings for The Remarkable Rocket for The National Ballet of Canada. His works are in the National Gallery of Canada, Canadian War Museum, the Art Gallery of Ontario, Vancouver Art Gallery and many other collections. He was a member of the Royal Canadian Academy of Arts, the Canadian Group of Painters, the Canadian Society of Graphic Art and was a fellow of the Royal Society of Canada. He taught at the Vancouver School of Art (1948); Northern Vocational School, Toronto; University of Toronto; Art Gallery of Toronto as it was then called; and at the Ontario College of Art. He lived in Toronto in Cabbagetown.

== Publications ==
- Jack Nichols, "Lithographs for Canadians", Journal, Royal Architectural Institute of Canada, vol. 26, no. 1, Jan 1949.

== Legacy ==
In 1998, a travelling show titled Memento Mori: The War Drawings of Jack Nichols was organized by Laura Brandon of the Canadian War Museum, Ottawa. In 2015, a movie called Jack Nichols: Mystery & Light was made for Youtube.

== Awards ==
- 1945 prize for Rescue at Sea shown at the Canadian Group of Painters exhibition;
- 1947 Guggenheim fellowship to travel and visit print studios and muralists in the United States
- 1952 prize at the Second International Exhibition of Drawing and Engraving in Lugano, Switzerland;
- 1953 Coronation medal;
- 1954 purchase prize, National Annual Exhibition, Hamilton, Ont.;
- 1956-1957 Canadian Government Overseas Fellowship to study lithography in France;
- 1957, 1960-1961 Canada Council fellowship to continue his study of the graphic arts in Paris;
- 1958 Venice Biennale - his lithographs, along with works by James Wilson Morrice, Jacques de Tonnancour and Anne Kahane represented Canada;

== See also ==
- Canadian official war artists
- War artist
- War art

== Notes ==
=== Further reading ===
- Bradfield, Helen (1970). Art Gallery of Ontario: the Canadian Collection. Toronto: McGraw Hill. ISBN 0070925046. Archived from the original on 7 June 2020.
- Brandon, Laura (1998). "Emotion as Document: Death and Dying in the Second World War Art of Jack Nichols". Material History Review. 48 (Fall): 123–130.
- Brandon, Laura (2021). War Art in Canada: A Critical History. Toronto: Art Canada Institute, 2021. ISBN 978-1-4871-0271-5
