= Canadians in Pakistan =

Total population
- 30,000-50,000 (2019)

Regions with significant populations
- Karachi · Lahore · Islamabad

Languages
- English, French, Urdu, Western Punjabi, Pashto, Sindhi

Religion
- Catholicism · Others Christians · Islam

Canadians in Pakistan are one of the sizeable Canadian diasporic communities established in Asia. They consist largely (although not exclusively) of Pakistani Canadians who have returned to Pakistan. In 1999 there were over 1,300 Canadians living in Pakistan.

== Notable people ==
- Adnan Sami - Pakistani/Indian singer with Canadian nationality.
- Dawud Wharnsby - singer/songwriter who seasonally resides in Abbottabad
- Sitara Hewitt - Canadian Actress
- Buland Akhtar Rana - Auditor General of Pakistan

== See also ==
- Canada–Pakistan relations
- Canadian diaspora
- Immigration to Pakistan
- Pakistani Canadians
