= Jacques de Tonnancour =

Canadian artist (born)

- Born: Jacques Godefroy de Tonnancour; January 3, 1917; Montreal, Quebec
- Died: January 13, 2005 (aged 88)
- Known for: artist, educator

Jacques Godefroy de Tonnancour, OC OQ RCA LL. D. (3 January 1917 – 13 January 2005) was a Canadian artist and art educator from Montreal, Quebec.

== Life and work ==
Jacques Godefroy de Tonnancour was born on 3 January 1917 in Montreal, Quebec. He studied at the École des beaux-arts de Montréal in 1937 but after three years left as he found the teaching too conservative. He admired the work of Goodridge Roberts and Paul Emile Borduas. He joined the Contemporary Arts Society of Montreal in 1942.

Though he admired Borduas as a painter, he was not in agreement with the political direction of the Automatistes. In 1948, he helped compose the manifesto which Alfred Pellan used to establish the Prisme d'yeux group. "We seek a painting freed from all contingencies of time and place, of restrictive ideology, conceived without any literary, political, philosophical or other meddling which could dilute its expression or compromise its purity" stated a translation of Prisme d'yeux that was published in Canadian Art. This group opposed those who would sign the Refus Global later that year, feeling that painting should not be a political act.

de Tonnancour had a long and active career as an artist, moving between representational and abstract approaches; producing paintings, sculptures, collages and photographs at various points in his career. His work is included many public collections including the Musée national des beaux-arts du Québec, National Gallery of Canada,; Leonard & Bina Ellen Art Gallery, Concordia University; Carleton University Art Gallery; Art Gallery of Nova Scotia; Art Gallery of Hamilton; Confederation Centre Art Gallery; Museum London; Art Gallery of Greater Victoria; and The Robert McLaughlin Gallery; among others.

In 1958, works by de Tonnancour along with those of James Wilson Morrice, Anne Kahane and Jack Nichols represented Canada at the Venice Biennale. He was made a member of the Royal Canadian Academy of Arts in 1977.

de Tonnancour taught at the Université du Québec à Montréal, the University of British Columbia and Mount Allison University. Among his students were Claude Tousignant and Graham Coughtry.

de Tonnancour retired from painting in 1982 to concentrate on entomology. In 2002, Les Éditions Hurtubise published Les Insectes. Monstres ou splendeurs cachées written and illustrated by de Tonnacour. The volume won the Prix Marcel-Couture in 2002. An English edition was published in 2002.

de Tonnancour died on 13 January 2005, aged 88, in Montreal, Quebec.

== Honors ==
- 1968 – Medal, Canada Council
- 1979 – Prix Louis-Philippe-Hébert
- 1979 – Officer of the Order of Canada
- 1986 – Honorary doctorate, Concordia University
- 1990 – Honorary doctorate, McGill University
- 1993 – Officer of the National Order of Quebec
