= Buland Akhtar Rana =

Auditor General of Pakistan

Buland Akhtar Rana was appointed Auditor General of Pakistan in August 2011 on the orders of President Asif Ali Zardari. The previous auditor-general was Tanvir Ali Agha, who had resigned amid a controversy over whether he was able to continue to hold office for another four months; subsequently, Aneece Marghub was appointed as the acting auditor-general. Rana belongs to Multan. Previously, he had been the acting secretary of the Human Rights Division and also served as deputy auditor-general. He is a well-educated officer and was also educated abroad.

The chairman of PAC threatened to resign over what he saw as the government proceeding to appoint its "favourite" and deserving officer in a cover up.

It is claimed that Rana was appointed because he was the most senior officer present at that time in the office. He holds dual Canadian citizenship, which is not a crime according to law if it is revealed.

The Chief Justice of Pakistan, Iftikhar Muhammad Chaudhry, wrote a letter to President Zardari in connection with appointment of Rana as Auditor General pointing out seven allegations of corruption and irregularities against him. Rana has a strong affiliation with the prime minister, Yousaf Raza, due to living in the same home town. His appointment is being looked upon merit. However, Zardari replied in a letter to the Chief Justice in which he cleared all allegations made against Rana. Hence, the appointment was accepted.

Rana was removed by the Supreme Judicial Council in May 2015 after a reference sent by the National Assembly.
