= Juan de Canaveris =

Piedmontese lawyer and politician

Don Juan de Canaveris

Portero decano of the Tribunal Mayor de Cuentas de Buenos Aires
- In office 1777–1810

Apoderado legal at the service of the Provinces of the Viceroyalty of the Río de la Plata
- In office 1772–1800

Personal details
- Born: Giovanni Antonio Domenico Jugluns de Canavery; 1748 Saluzzo, Piedmont, Kingdom of Sardinia
- Died: August 22, 1822 (aged 73–74) Buenos Aires, United Provinces of the River Plate
- Resting place: Church of La Merced
- Party: Bureaucrat - until 1810; Revolutionary
- Spouse: Catalina Bernarda de Esparza
- Relatives: Juan José Rocha y de la Torre (half-brother-in-law)
- Occupation: government executor politician farmer
- Profession: jurist accountant
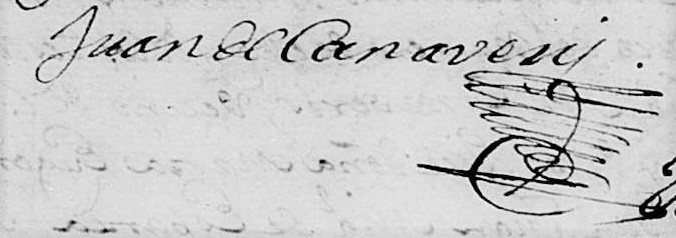
- Signature

Military service
- Allegiance: Savoy-Sardinia - until 1770; Spanish Empire - until 1810 (Argentina) United Provinces of the River Plate
- Years of service: 1806-1810 (Buenos Aires)
- Battles/wars: British invasions of the Río de la Plata; May Revolution

Juan de Canaveris (or Canaverys) (1748 – 1822) was an Piedmontese lawyer and politician, who served during the viceroyalty of Río de la Plata as accounting officer in the Tribunal de Cuentas de Buenos Aires. He had achieved a high social status in the Viceroyalty of the Río de la Plata, where he supported the revolutionary movements of May, being the only neighbor (founding fathers of Argentina) of Italian origin who attended in the Open Cabildo, of May 22, 1810.

Juan Canaverys also had an active participation in the Hermandad de la Santa Caridad, the first charitable society of Buenos Aires. He was the founder of the family of that last name in Buenos Aires, connected in turn with the main Argentine families of the colonial and post colonial period of Argentina and Uruguay, and the direct ancestor of prominent military, revolutionaries, lawyers, notaries, politicians and priests of Buenos Aires. He had a long career in Buenos Aires, serving as attorney-in-fact of Francisco Maciel and Victorián de Villava. In 1798 he was appointed as representative of the City Council of Santiago del Estero. During the May Revolution he integrated the sector proposed by Pascual Ruiz Huidobro and Feliciano Chiclana, political group that proposed the destitution of the Viceroy and the assumption of the government by the Cabildo de Buenos Aires, in form of a provisional government.

== Early years ==
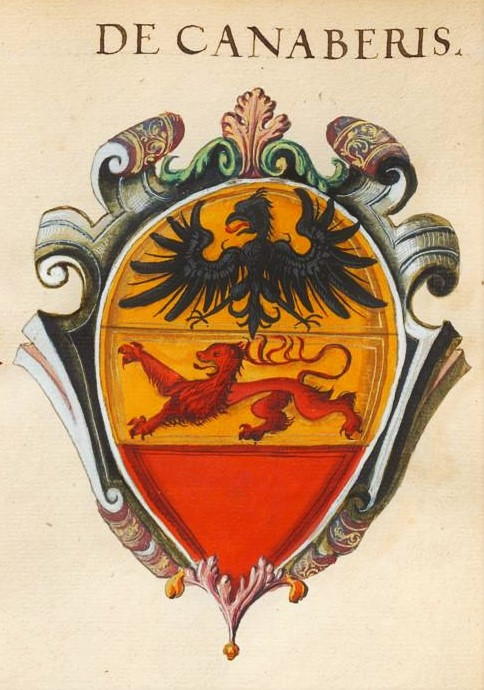
Arms of Canaveris, Milan branch 16th century.

Giovanni Antonio Domenico de Canaveris was born near the year 1748 in Saluzzo (Principality of Piedmont), during the end of the War of the Austrian Succession. His parents were Gabriel Antonio Canaveris and Margherita Jugluns, belonging to a noble family from Verzuolo. He arrived at Río de la Plata about 1770, in times of the Bourbon Reforms in the Spanish Empire.

His first registered public intervention dates from the year 1772. Is probable that his first works in Buenos Aires were related to commercial activities. In 1776, he was appointed to exercise the position of "portero" of the Real Tribunal de Cuentas of Buenos Aires, an institution created by order of the Viceroy Pedro de Cevallos and José de Gálvez, Minister of the Indies.

He was employee of the Contaduría de Retasas of the Tribunal de Cuentas during the entire period of the Viceroyalty of the Río de la Plata, leaving his post of portero accountant for a brief period in 1795 and 1799.

In 1785 Canaveris was employed interim of the Junta Montepío de Ministros, an institution established for assistance to widows and families of government employees. Although the work of "portero" (accounting officer) was not a hierarchical position, Canaveris was the oldest officer in the Court of Auditors. He earned five hundred pesos a year, the same amount as a Senior Accountant.

As an officer of the Court of Auditors he was in charge of protocol matters, clerk and responsible for the key of the Camara de Sesiones (Chamber of Sections) of the Court. For his services rendered to the Court of Accounts Juan Canaveris received an increase in his salary by Real Order on June 8, 1799.

His actions as attorney-in-fact in judicial and commercial matters were concerning to some of the main political leaders of the Viceroyalty like Juan de Dios Salas, Bernabé González Bueno, Martín Grandoli, and Joseph Medianero, a Spanish official who served in the Fuerte de Floridablanca. He also intervened as a representative of Mariano Tristán y Moscoso, in a sale contract for this to Manuel Arredondo y Pelegrín, regent of Buenos Aires.

He also served as an attorney of the Council of Santiago del Estero, on behalf of the elected aldermen of the City Council Juan Joseph de Erquicia and Juan Joseph de Iramain. He presented a writ in defense of aldermen to the Viceroy Antonio de Olaguer y Feliú, to avoid annulment the elections, held in that province on July 20, 1796.

His most recognized work was as a representative of Victorián de Villava, the Protector Guardian of Natural resources and Indians in the village of San Pablo, Capinota Province, Bolivia. In his name he had obtained permission from the viceroyal authorities to build four windmills in a site known as "Cucumí".

He also provided his services as a lawyer to Joseph de la Cruz, a soldier of the Regimiento Fijo de Buenos Aires, who served under Félix de Azara, and as the legal agent of the family of José de Zárate, a well-known Captain of the Cuerpo de Blandengues de Buenos Aires.

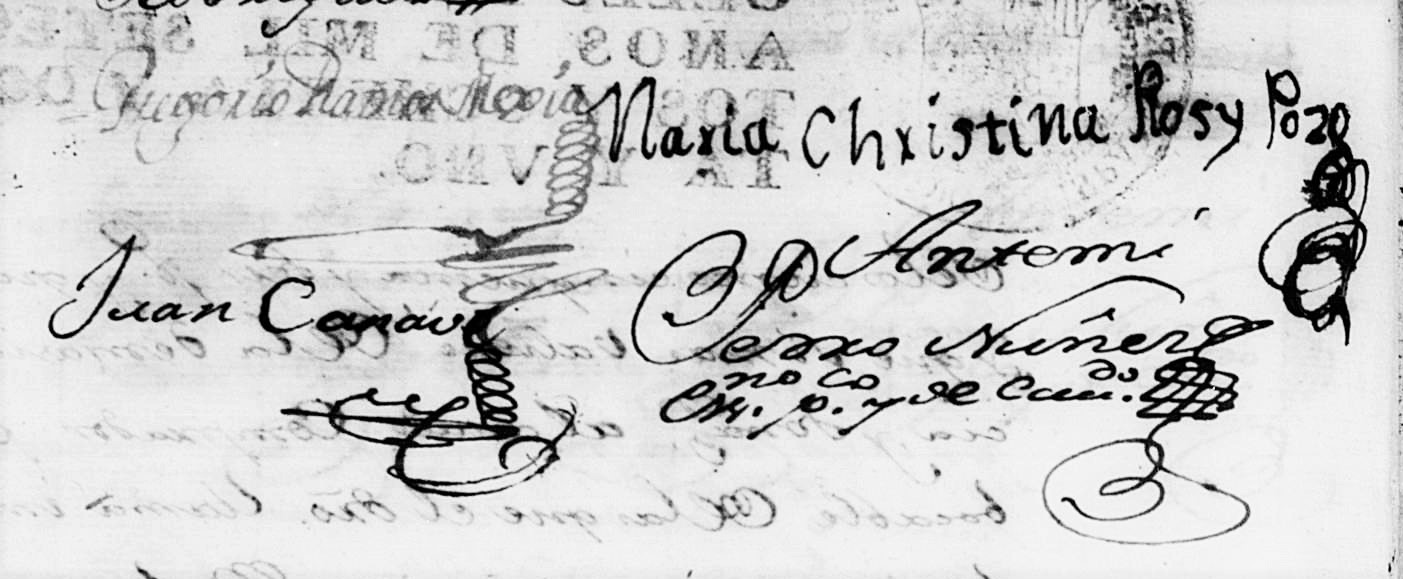
signatures of Juan Canave (Canaveris) and María Cristina Ross.

He was involved in the establishment of the Hospital de Caridad, the first public hospital in Montevideo, Uruguay. In 1796 he was appointed as legal representative of Francisco Antonio Maciel to manage the approval, the Diocesan of Buenos Aires, for the construction of a public hospital in Montevideo.

He maintained a solid social and economic position in the provinces of the Río de la Plata, owned several homes, barracks, lands, jewelry, and servants. Among the neighbors with whom he had commercial relations was María Cristina Ross, daughter of Guillermo Ross, born in the Scottish Highlands.

In 1777 he sold a property located in the neighborhood of San Nicolás (Buenos Aires) to Ángel Castelli, a well-known doctor born in Greece. In 1791 he took charge of the legal affairs of the brothers Manuel and José Robredo, a Spanish naval officer who served as an expeditionary of Alejandro Malaspina.

His legal affairs in the Río de la Plata were attended by distinguished members of the local aristocracy, including services provided by Martín Joseph de Segovia, a lawyer who was in charge of his personal assets in the territories of the Río de la Plata. His legal affairs before the Court of Madrid were entrusted to Justo José Cosio, in charge of the judicial proceedings of the Esparza Sánchez family.

== English Invasions and May Revolution ==
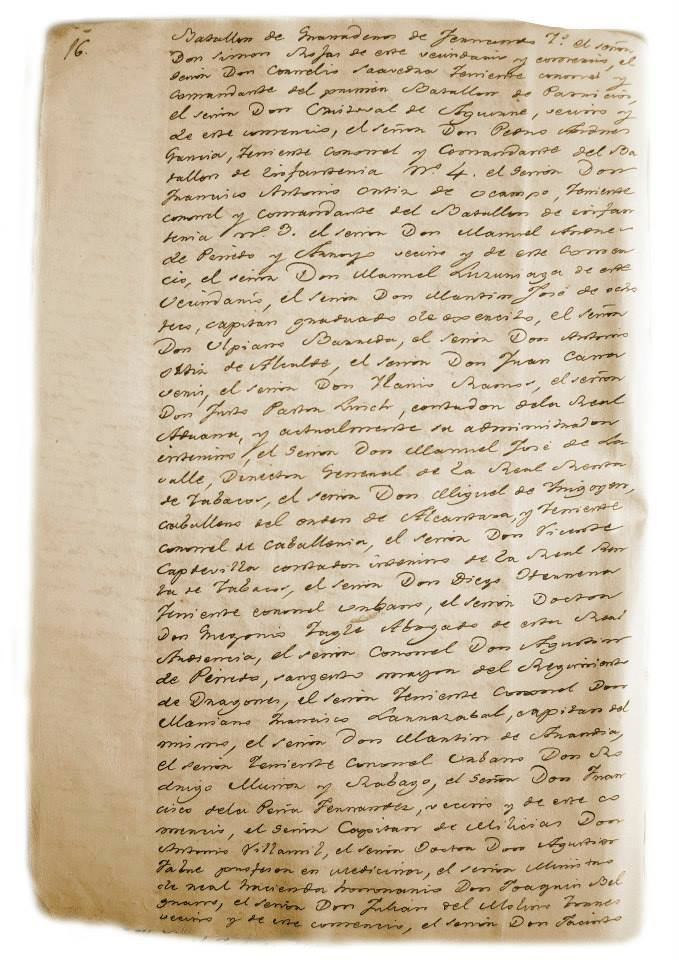
original record of May 22, 1810 (May Revolution)

It is possible who Juan Canaveris has provided some military service in Piedmont or Spain before settling in Buenos Aires. A man with his last name is registered as a soldier who served in the Regiment of Hibernia or Regiment of Saboya, and who participated in the Second Cevallos expedition to the Río Grande. He and his family had a prominent participation in the defense and reconquest of Buenos Aires during the English invasions. He and his colleagues from the Court of Accounts refused to take oath to Beresford and also participated in secret meetings organized by residents of the city.

He also collaborated with the money donations organized by the Cabildo of Buenos Aires, chaired by Martín de Alzaga. His sons, José, Mariano, Manuel, and Joaquín participated in the defense of Buenos Aires in the regiments — Quinteros and Labradores, Húsares of Pueyrredón, Cántabros Montañeses and Tercio de Vizcaínos. In 1808, his son Mariano Canaveris, hero of the reconquest and second lieutenant graduated from the 1st Battalion of Husares, requested permission to join the ranks of the Escuadrón de Carabineros de Carlos IV.

The Friar Martin Esparza, a relative of Canaveris's wife, was killed by British troops during the second invasion in the interior of Convent of Santo Domingo.

His grandson, Apolinario Linera Canaveris was born during the English occupation of the city, and the sister of this, Mercedes Clara Linera Canaveris on August 12, 1807, anniversary of the reconquest.

Juan de Canaveris is recognized for being one of the neighbors who were invited to attend the open Cabildo of May 22, 1810 (May Revolution), event that gave rise to the Argentine Republic. He belonged to the moderate group that wanted the cabildo to assume the government until it could be returned to the Spanish Crown. He reproduced the vote of Feliciano Chiclana in favor of dismissing the Viceroy Baltasar Hidalgo de Cisneros. His wife was a distant relative of Antonio Beruti and Domingo French, two of the leaders of the revolution.

Like many patricians of the time, he also dedicated himself to the purchase of land and the administration of farms, one of them located in the town of Quilmes. He also was the owner of a farm in the town of San Isidro, located in the vicinity of the hacienda of Juan Martín de Pueyrredón and Miguel de Azcuénaga, personal friend of Canaveris and his family.

== Family ==
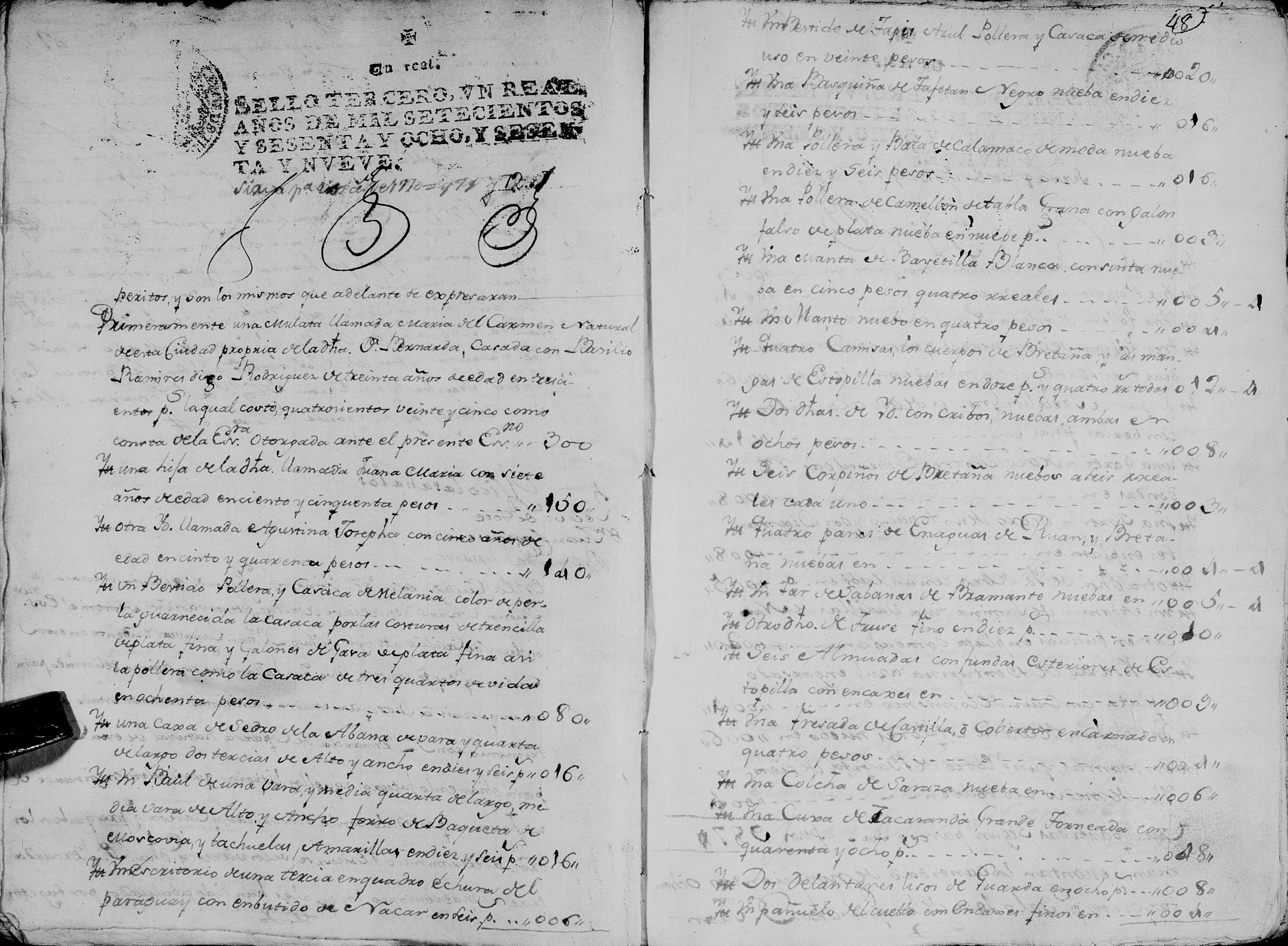
dowry of Bernarda Catalina Esparza to Juan de Canaveris

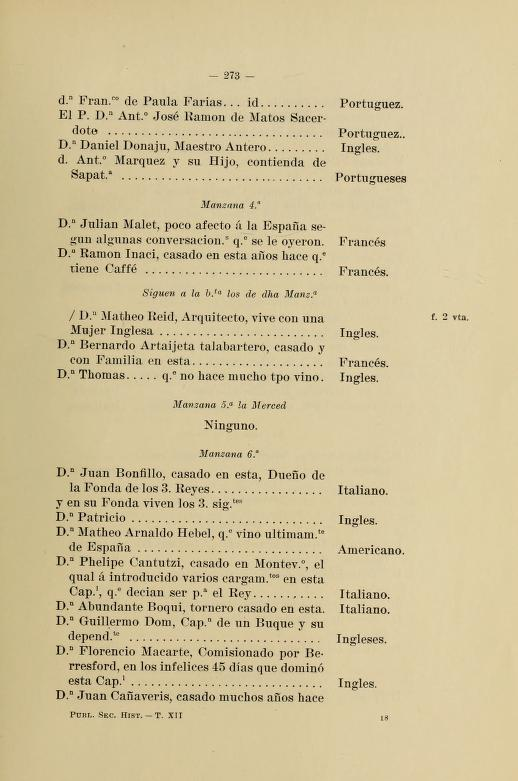
Canaveris and Juan Bonfiglio, owner of Fonda de los Tres Reyes (1809 census)

Juan Canaveris was married to Catalina Bernarda de Esparza, a noble maiden, daughter of Juan Miguel de Esparza and María Eugenia Sánchez. His wedding was celebrated on May 4, 1772, in the Cathedral of Buenos Aires by José Antonio Acosta, a distinguished parish priest of the city.

He and his wife lived in the neighborhood of San Nicolás, had twelve children, six boys and six girls, born between 1773 and 1797, María Ramona Canaveris, María Antonia Canaveris, María Dominga Canaveris, Juan Miguel Canaveris (1778-1803), godson of Mariano Olier, Juan Joseph Canaveris, María Eugenia Canaveris, Mariano Canaveris, Manuel Canaveris, Joaquín Canaveris, Juana Josefa Canaveris, José Mariano de la Cruz Canaveris and María de la Encarnación Canaveris, married to Alejo Menchaca, native of Biscay.

The house of Juan Canaveris was located was located on Calle de la Piedad No. 21, 23, 27 and 29 (between the current Reconquista and 25 de Mayo), in the vicinity of the Fonda de los Tres Reyes, the main inn in the city in early 1800. He and his wife were fervent Catholics, belonged to the Orden de la Merced, and were the founders of a chaplaincy in the city. His daughters, María Antonia and Dominga Canaveris, belonged to the religious order of Saint Dominic.

Juan Canaveris and Bernarda Catalina de Esparza were the grandparents of Sinforoso Amoedo, a medical doctor, who died during the yellow fever epidemic of 1871, and Ángel Canaveris, a prestigious doctor in psychiatry, head of the mental Hospital Vilardebó in 1879. His family also was related to Domingo Matheu, member of the Primera Junta, who was godfather of María del Carmen, María de la Candelaria, Mariano Domingo and María Antonia Bayá Canaveris.

Cristina Francisca Axa Canaveris, a great-granddaughter of Juan Canaveris, was married to Pedro Vicente Acevedo Echevarria, grandson of Vicente Anastasio Echevarría, secretary of the Assembly of the Year XIII.

Juan de Canaveris died on August 22, 1822, being buried in the Iglesia de la Merced. His wife, Bernarda Catalina de Esparza died several years later. The last noble branches were the Canavery-Páez, Canavery-Andrade, Canavery-Alvarado Périchon, Canavery-Flores, Canavery-Segrestan, Canavery-Pelliza, Canaveris-Luna, Canaveris-Gutiérrez, Canaveris-Trillo, Canaveris-Panelo and Canavery-Castillo.

His last name is directly and indirectly linked to families Acevedo, Argerich, Bayá, Casablanca, Cuyar, Ezeyza-Halliburton-Wright, Lagleyze, Lamela, Linera, Lezcano, Luna, Martínez Dizido, Marull, Medina, Michelena, Morel, Nazar Anchorena, Pelliza, Peralta Ramos, Saravi, Sautú, Somoza, Thorne, Trillo, Ugarteche and Vitón. It is through his daughter María Eugenia Canaveris de Bayá (ancestor of Gloria María Bayá), that his genealogy traces an illustrious connection with the General Justo José de Urquiza, president of the Argentine Confederation between 1854 and 1860.

Through the Peralta Ramos family his genealogy is linked with Millicent Rogers, a fashion icon figure, belonging to the family of Henry Huttleston Rogers.

== Legacy ==
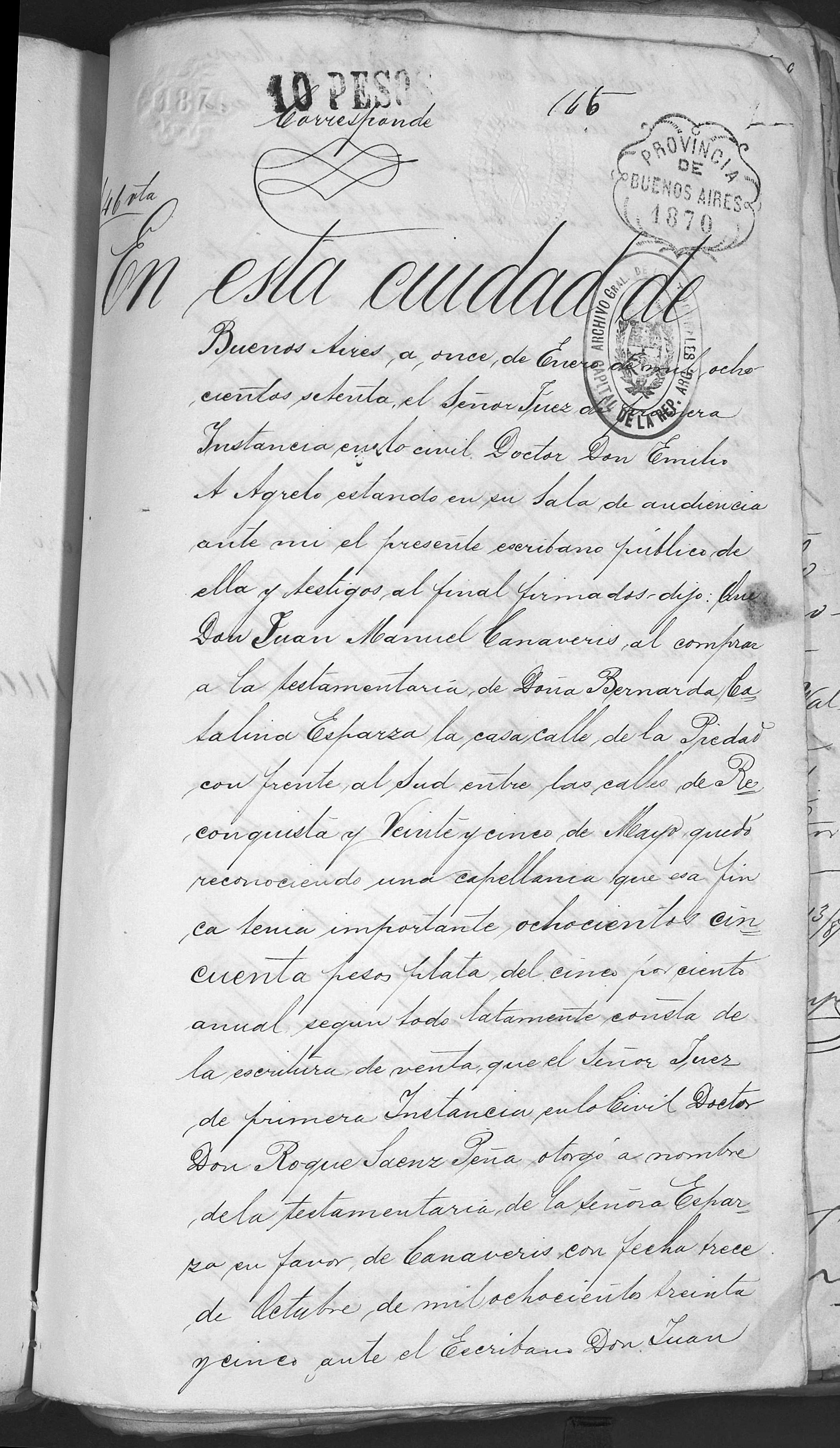
record about the correct location of the Canaveris Esparza family home

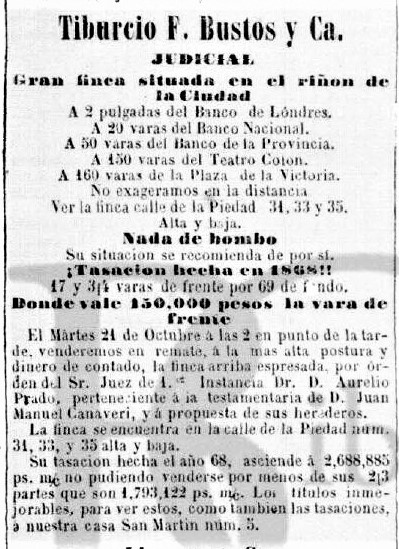
notice concerning the auction of his house (1870)

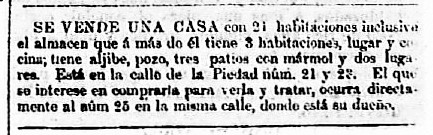
announcement of the sale of his property in 1857

Giovanni Canaveri had emigrated from the Province of Cuneo, Piedmont to Republic of Genoa in times of Charles Emmanuel III, and settled possibly in Provence, later in Spain and then in Buenos Aires during the reign of Charles III, who implemented the Bourbon reforms in the Spanish colonies.

Juan de Canaveris used a large number of variants of his original surname, signing documents such as Canavero, Canavé, Canaven, Canaberis, Canavery and others. Canaveris, Canaveriis o Canaveri is a toponymic surname, present in antiquity in North Italy and France, including the regions of Turin and Rhône.

His family were related to the beginnings of Argentine education, pioneers in adopting the Lancasterian teaching system in the United Provinces of the Río de la Plata. Some of his descendants were also involved the establishment of the railways in Buenos Aires (public deeds), including the Great Southern Railway and Lacroze Railroad.

General Enrique Mosconi, a maternal great-grandson of Juan Canaveris, and whose father engineer took part in the construction of Central Argentine Railway, was president of Yacimientos Petrolíferos Fiscales, and served between 1906 and 1908, in the German Army as captain in the 1st Battalion of Pioners of Westphalian.

His descendants took part in most of the political and military events in Argentina and Uruguay, including those that occurred towards the end of the 19th century. Some of them integrated the ranks of the main political parties of the time like the National Autonomist Party, Unión Cívica Radical, National Party and National Civic Union.

His caste also took an active part in the birth of the economic institutions of Argentina, including the Bank of the Province of Buenos Aires, Casa de Moneda de la República Argentina and Buenos Aires Stock Exchange. Members of his family also participated in the colonization of La Pampa, and the Argentine Patagonia, providing police, military and political services. His descendant Samuel Canaveris (1854 - c 1920) was Mayor of Río Gallegos on several occasions. The son of this M. Canaveri presided over the honorary commission of Immigration in Santa Cruz Province, sub-chaired by Juan D. Aubone and Víctor Fenton.

Pedro Canaveri and Zoilo Canavery, great-great-grandchildren of Juan Canaveris were precursors of the Argentine soccer. Another member of the family linked to the sport was Carlos M. Canaveris, who integrated the First Directive Commission of the Club Atlético y Tiro Federal of Puan in 1907.

Stephen Achinelly (1800-1845), a British stockbroker born in Gibraltar, linked to the Bayá Canaveris and Thompson-Cunningham families, is registered as a founding partner of British Hospital of Buenos Aires in 1844.

The houses of the Canaveris Esparza family, which also had a warehouse and stables, were rented to English, French and Irish immigrants established in Buenos Aires since the end of the colonial period. It was also inhabited in his adulthood by his sons Joaquín and Juan José Canaveris, and then acquired at public auction by his grandson Juan Manuel Canaveris, who lived in it until his death in 1868. The houses of Nos. 21 and 23 were sold by Juan Manuel Canaveris to Nicolás Hugo de Anchorena (husband Mercedes Castellanos de Anchorena) in 1857. These properties had a land of seventeen and a half yards in front and seventy yards of surface in the background.

His home was in the vicinity of the central branches of the Banco Británico de la América del Sud and Banco de Londres y Río de la Plata, established in the area since 1860s.

Juan Canaveris also owned land in the current town of La Lucila. These lands were sold by his son Joaquín Canaveris to Lorenzo Antonio Uriarte, who in turn sold them to Martina Monasterio de Llavallol, wife of Felipe Llavallol.

So far no record is found about the genealogy of his parents Gabriel Canaveris and Margarita Jugluns, but apparently was a mixed family ancestry of the Piedmontese aristocracy, the French bourgeoisie, and an Irish family, possibly linked to the Brigades that served in France, Northern Italy or Spain towards the 17th or 18th century. His idiosyncrasy and that of their descendants until the third or fourth generation, is nothing like the Italian or Spanish Creole families of their time. A trips to Paris and London made in 1830 by his grandson Juan Manuel Bayá Canaveris, possibly suggests a paternal connection in Western Europe or Ireland.

Juan Canaveris never made a will, his last record in the post-colonial period is in the claim for the rights of his wife in the testamentary of Doctor Francisco Antonio de Esparza, a direct relative of Catalina Bernarda de Esparza. His wife, who died on December 17, 1832, in the town of San Isidro, received a distinguished and solemn funeral officiated by Father Bernardo de la Colina in the Santo Domingo Convent, place where she was buried.
