= Canaveris =

Canaveris is the surname of the following people

- Ángel Canaveris (1847–1897), Argentine psychiatrist, son of Juan Manuel
- Isabelino Canaveris (1852-1900s), Uruguayan patriot, military, revolutionary and politician
- Juan de Canaveris (1748–1822), Italian lawyer
- Juan Manuel Canaveris (1804–1868), Argentine attorney, merchant, teacher and military officer, son of José and brother of Feliciano
- Joaquín Canaveris (1789–1840s), Argentine merchant and city official, son of Juan
- José Canaveris (1780–1837), Argentine politician, notary, prosecutor and accountant, son of Juan
- Manuel Canaveris (1787–1830), Argentine army officer, son of Juan

== See also ==
- Canaveri
