= Maciel =

Maciel may refer to:

== People ==
- Maciel (surname), a Portuguese surname
- Maciel (footballer, born 1972) (Maciel Luiz Franco), Brazilian footballer
- Maciel (footballer, born 1978) (Maciel Lima Barbosa da Cunha), Brazilian footballer
- Maciel (footballer, born 2000) (Lucas Maciel Felix), Brazilian footballer
- Maciel Monteiro (disambiguation), several people
- Maciel Santos (born 1985), Brazilian boccia player

== Others ==
- Hospital Maciel, Montevideo, Uruguay
- Maciel, Paraguay, a district of the Caazapá Department
