= José Canaveris =

Argentine jurist and politician

Capitán Juan José Canaveris

Personal details
- Born: Juan José Ramón de Canaveris Jugluns; January 19, 1780 Buenos Aires
- Died: October 18, 1837 (aged 57) Buenos Aires
- Resting place: Cementerio del Norte
- Party: Federal (Lomo Negro)
- Spouse: María Agustina Denis (1785–1823)
- Children: María Manuela Canaveris; Juan Manuel Canaveris; María Justa Canaveris; Manuel José Canaveris; José María Canaveris; Patricia Canaveris; Feliciano Canaveris; Gerónimo Canaveris; Donata Canaveris
- Relatives: Ángel Canaveris (grandson); Sinforoso Canaveris (nephew); Juan Miguel de Esparza (grandfather); Juan José Rocha y Esparza (cousin); Juan Manuel Bayá (nephew)
- Occupation: army teacher lawyer government merchant
- Profession: jurist
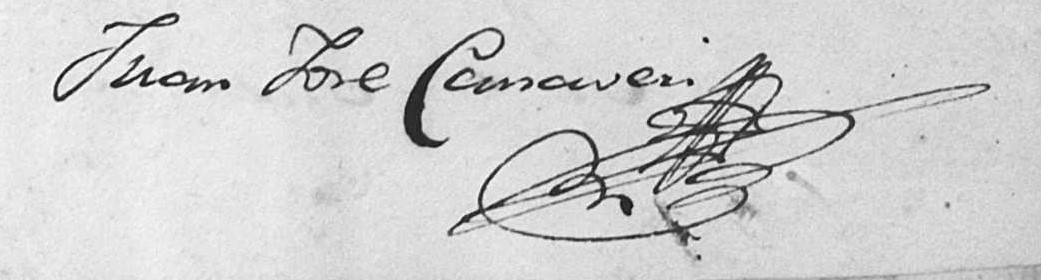
- Signature

Military service
- Allegiance: Spanish Empire — until 1810 (Argentina) United Provinces of the River Plate
- Branch/service: Argentine Army
- Years of service: 1806-1828
- Rank: Captain
- Unit: Cuerpo de Quinteros y Labradores; Regimiento de Patricios
- Commands: Creole militias of Buenos Aires; Inspección y Comandancia General de Armas
- Battles/wars: British invasions of the Río de la Plata; Argentine Civil Wars

Juan José Canaveris (1780–1837) was an Argentine jurist and politician, who served as military man, lawyer, notary, prosecutor and accountant of Buenos Aires. In 1809 he was honored by the Junta Suprema de Sevilla, for his heroic participation in the defense of Buenos Aires, during the English invasions in the Río de la Plata.

He took an active part during the post colonial period of Argentina serving in the Comisaría de Guerra and the Ministerio de Hacienda of the United Provinces of the Rio de la Plata. He belonged to the dissident faction of the Federal Party led by Juan José Viamonte, a political opponent of Juan Manuel de Rosas.

== Early years ==
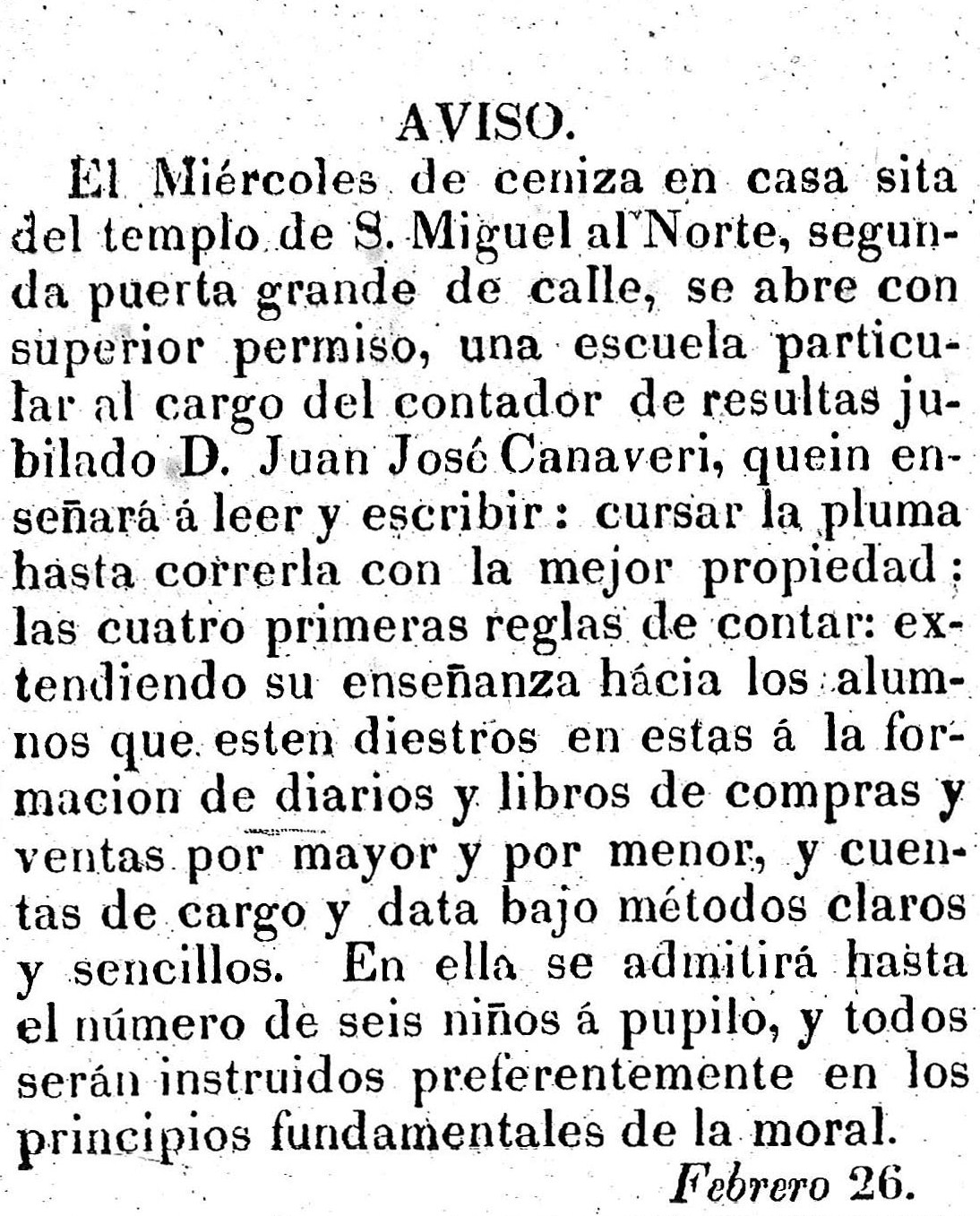
Notice about private school

He was born in Buenos Aires, the son of Juan Canaveris and Catalina Bernarda de Esparza, belonging to a distinguished family. He possibly did his elementary studies at the Royal College of San Carlos, and tertiary studies at the National University of Córdoba, where he received his law degree. He began his career as government official in the early of 1800s, being later appointed to the position of notary at the Tribunal Mayor de Cuentas in 1810.

He took an active part in the defense of the city during the British invasions of the Río de la Plata, serving as assistant in the Cuerpo de Quinteros y Labradores, a cavalry unit under the command of Antonio Luciano Ballester and Juan Clavería, distinguished landowners of the Province of Buenos Aires.

For his heroic actions during the invasions Canaveris was awarded by order of the Supreme Junta of Seville, who in the name of Ferdinand VII of Spain, he was promoted to the rank of Captain of the Militias. The Corps of Quinteros was conformed in its majority by farmers, ranchers and gauchos from the Province of Buenos Aires.

He ran various advertisements in the major newspapers of his time, including the Gazeta de Buenos Aires. In 1826 he was entrusted by the Captain José María Palomeque with the arrangements for the sale of a farm located in the town of Quilmes, published on September 23 of this year by La Gaceta Mercantil.

He had a long activity as a criminal lawyer of the United Provinces of the Rio de la Plata, serving as legal representative of people from the patrician society, as well as the poor peasants of the Campaign area (Buenos Aires Province). He began his career as a lawyer towards the end of the colonial period, taking an active part in litigation matters, including his services to Colonel Francisco Montes Larrea, a respectable military man, who had suffered an assault in the Fonda de los Tres Reyes.

He also served as procurador del número (justice assistant) of Buenos Aires between 1826 and 1833. He is registered providing services as a procurador for the City of Buenos Aires in the Guia de la Ciudad y Almanaque de Comercio de Buenos Aires para el Año de 1826 and Guia de la Ciudad y Almanaque de Comercio de Buenos Aires para el Año de 1833, a guide and calendar published by the French roots lawyer Juan José María Blondel, established in the city since the early 1820s.

He also had an active participation in the beginnings of Argentine education, a pioneer in the application of the Lancasterian method in the Río de la Plata. He had a school of first letters located a few meters from the Church of San Miguel de Arcangel.

== Political life ==
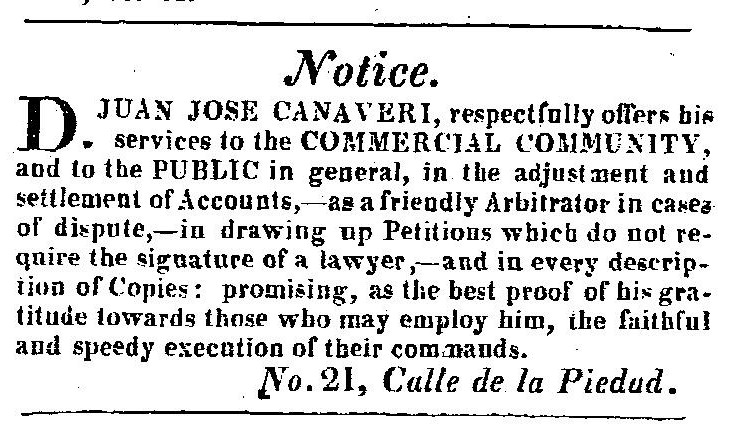
José Canaveri in The British Packet of August 1, 1835.

Like all members of his family, Juan José Canaveris supported the May Revolution and the Argentine War of Independence. Between 1815 and 1819 he served in the Junta de Observación, in Comisaría de Guerra, and in the Ministerio de Hacienda of Buenos Aires. He served in the Honorable Junta de Representantes in 1820, and was appointed to occupy the position of accountant of the Tribunal de Cuentas of Buenos Aires in 1821.

He and his family were involved in political conflicts between federales and unitarios, occurred during the Argentine Civil War. He was present together with Miguel José de Azcuénaga and Gervasio Espinosa, at the house of Governor Juan José Viamonte, when his house was attacked with shots by bandits belonging to the Sociedad Popular Restauradora. The Viamonte meeting took place during his second term as governor of Buenos Aires, and it is mentioned in the personal correspondence of Encarnación Ezcurra to her husband Juan Manuel de Rosas.

In 1830, Canaveris served in the Inspección and Comandancia General de Armas, taking an active part in the enrollment of volunteers to be incorporated into the Regiment of Patricians.

He was also involved in the beginnings of the economic institutions of the Río de la Plata, taking part in the National Bank meetings with distinguished figures of his time, like the Italian journalist Pedro de Ángelis, the English Thomas Gowland and Juan Zimmermann, a businessman belonging to the German community of Buenos Aires.

In 1833, he was part of the jury charged with ensuring the freedom of the press in the Argentina. He belonged to the moderate sector of the Federal Party, known as "lomos negros". He suffered political persecution during the government of Juan Manuel de Rosas, being accused of Unitario in 1835.

Retired from political activity Juan José Canaveris returned to practice his career as a lawyer and accountant towards the end of his life. In 1835, he published several notices in the Weekly British Packet, and Argentine News, offering his services as a lawyer and accountant to the American and Anglo-Argentine community of Buenos Aires.

== Family ==
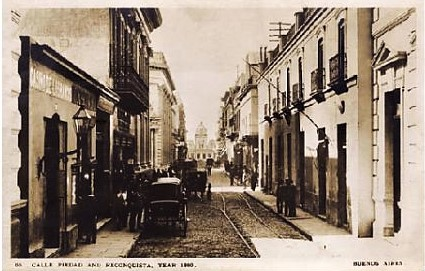
Calle de la Piedad, corner Reconquista by 1880

Juan Joseph Canaveris was married to Agustina Denis, daughter of Juan Denis and María Silva, a distinguished Creole family, descendants of settlers from Ireland and Portugal.

He lived all his life in his father's house, located on Calle de la Piedad, between Reconquista and 25 de Mayo, neighborhood of San Nicolás. He was neighbor of Vicente Anastasio Echevarría (colonial period), and by a large number of English and Irish people installed in the neighborhood, including Edmundo Cranwell. He was registered with Julian Viola and Teresa Posadas (daughter of Gervasio Antonio de Posadas) in the Censo de 1827 of Buenos Aires.

Several members of his family including siblings, cousins, and nephews were divided over political issues. His son Juan Manuel Canaveris, had participated in the military escort the remains of Manuel Dorrego from Navarro to the La Recoleta Cemetery. He actively served in the early days of the Rosas government, later having to go into exile in Montevideo.

His other son Feliciano Canaveris also military, was assassinated in January 1843 in the vicinity of Tacuarembó, and his execution was attributed to General Manuel Oribe.

His nephew-in-law was Colonel Francisco Crespo y Denis, a patriot who took part in the Argentine War of Independence. His family was directly linked to Colonel Francisco Pantaleón Luna, who served as Lieutenant Governor of La Rioja Province.

His daughter, Patricia Canaveris Denis, born on March 17, 1811 (Saint Patrick's Day) received a state pension for the services rendered by his father to the National State.

He was in charge of the funeral arrangements for his mother, Catalina Bernarda Esparza de Canaveris, who died on December 17, 1832, in the town of San Isidro. Her remains were transferred from San Isidro to Buenos Aires, to be buried in the Santo Domingo Convent.

It is not clear if the legitimate father's last name was Canaveris or "Jugluns", a surname possibly of French origin (Juglan, present in the Provence region), and completely unknown in the Piedmont region. His idiosyncrasy and that of his brothers and family was not at all like the French or Italian community of the colonial and post-colonial period of Buenos Aires, and it is quite possible that their paternal ancestors were of noble or bourgeois origin. Historically they lived in places of Buenos Aires where English, Scottish and Irish communities were established.
