= The British Packet, and Argentine News =

Anglo-Argentine newspaper

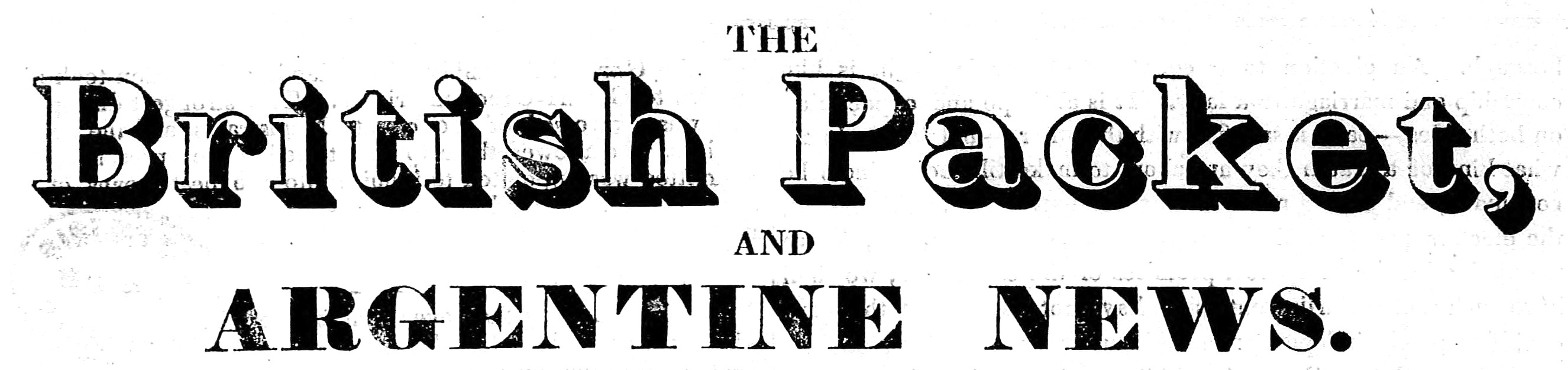
- Type: Weekly newspaper
- Founder: Thomas George Love.
- Publisher: Jones & Co
- Editor: Gilbert Ramsay; Alexander Brander; James Kiernan
- Founded: August 4, 1826
- Language: English
- Headquarters: United Kingdom
- Country: Argentina

The British Packet, and Argentine News was an Anglo-Argentine weekly newspaper, edited for the British and American community of Buenos Aires. The journal was founded by Thomas George Love in 1826, and published until 1859.

== History ==
His first print was published on Friday, 4 August 1826, and among other notices reference was made to the conflict between Argentina and Brazil (Cisplatine War). Edited mainly for the British community, it had among its readers members of the American and German community, including Irish Catholics, and their descendants, established in Buenos Aires since the 18th century.

The British Packet, and Argentine News was the main English-speaking newspaper of the Río de la Plata. During the second English invasion, was edited The Southern Star, a bilingual newspaper published in Montevideo.

Another important English-speaking newspaper was The Cosmopolitan, whose first print run was published on Wednesday, 23 November 1831.

== Gallery ==
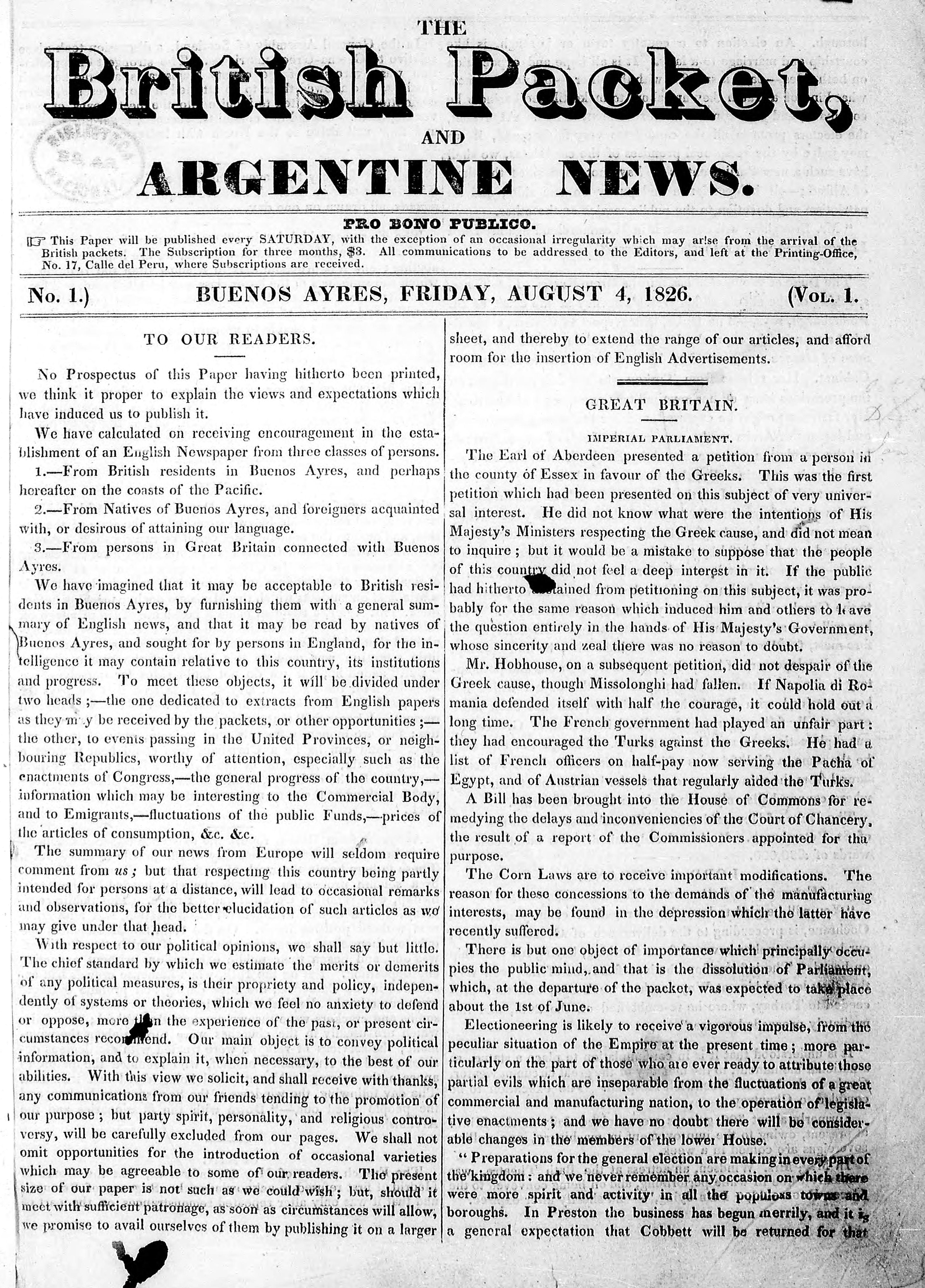
cover of the first issue of The British Packet, and Argentine News published on August 4, 1826.

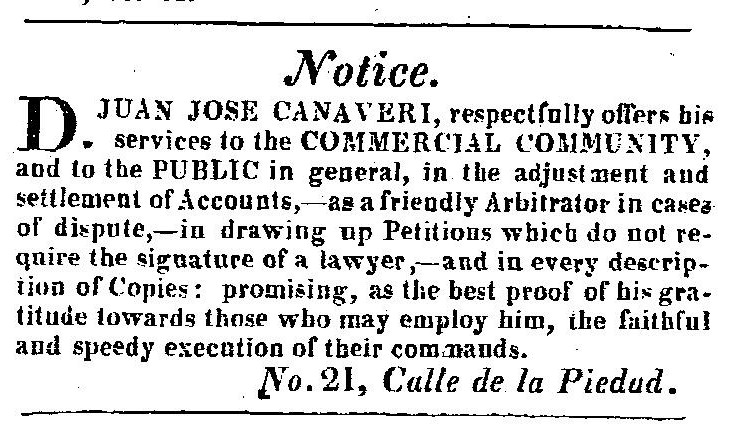
announcement of Juan José Canaveri, offering his legal services to the community.

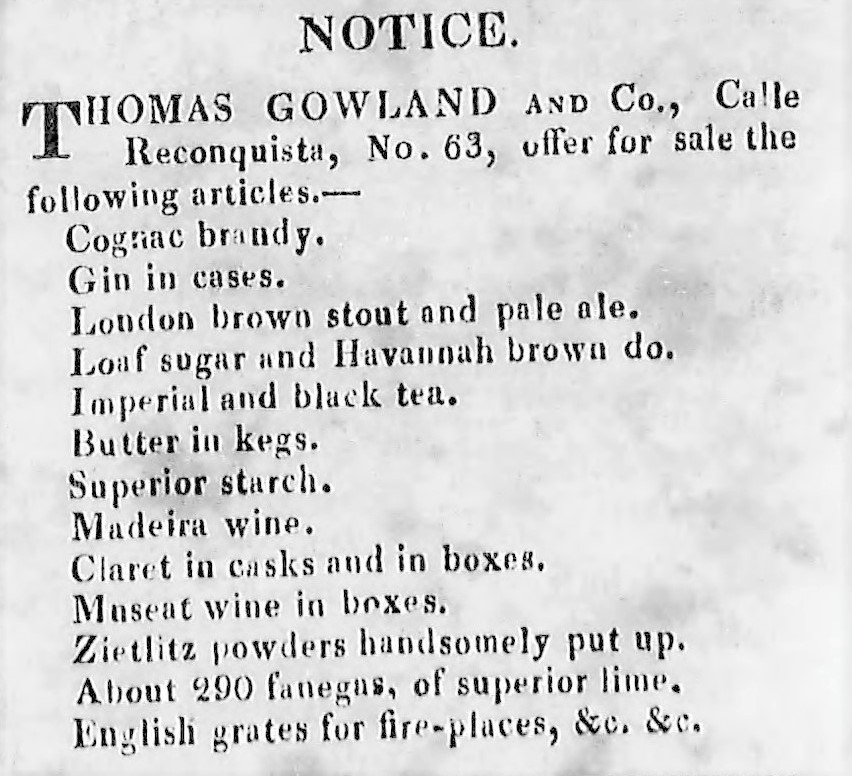
sale of Thomas Gowland products.

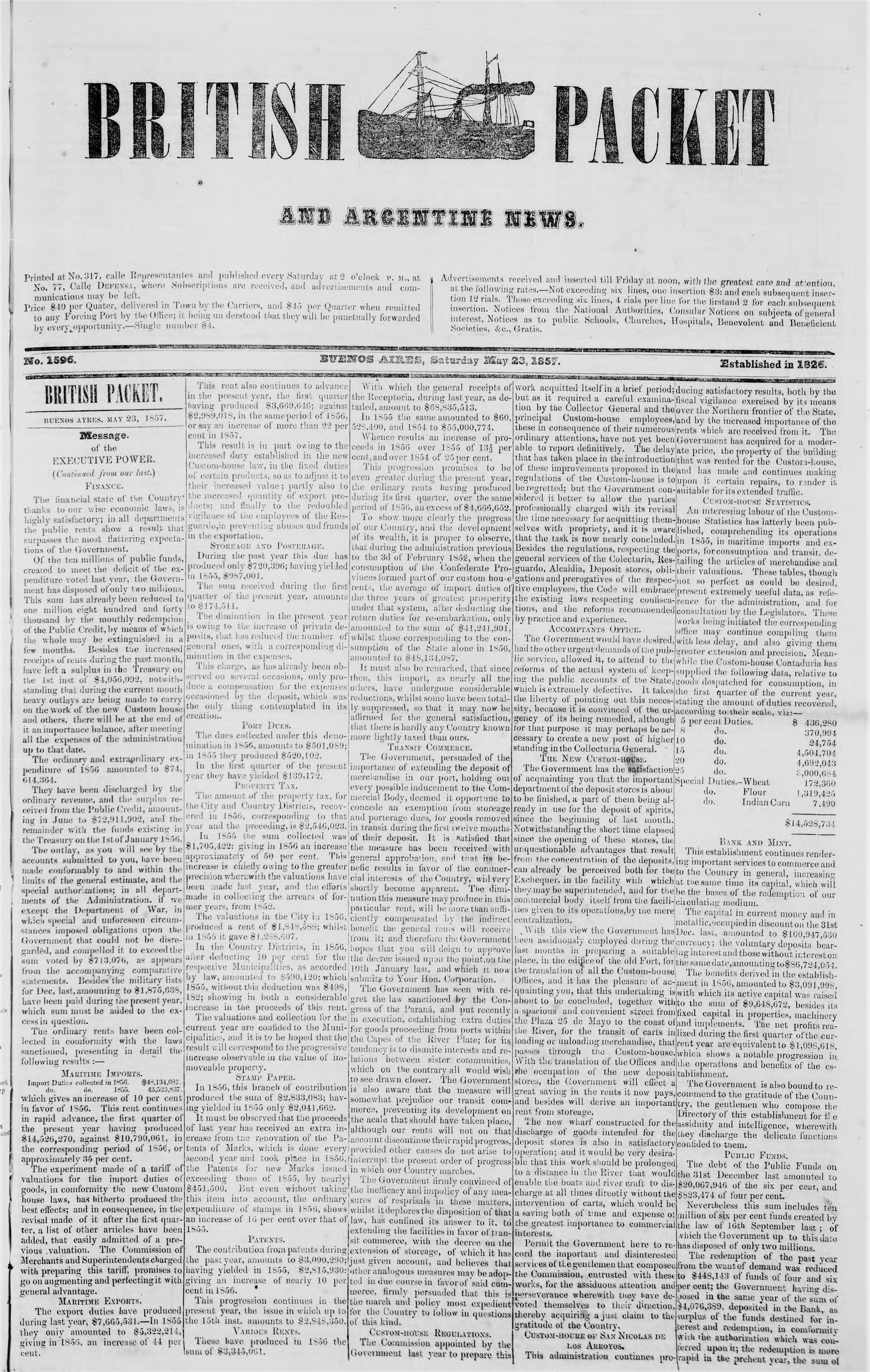
one of the last runs of the newspaper .

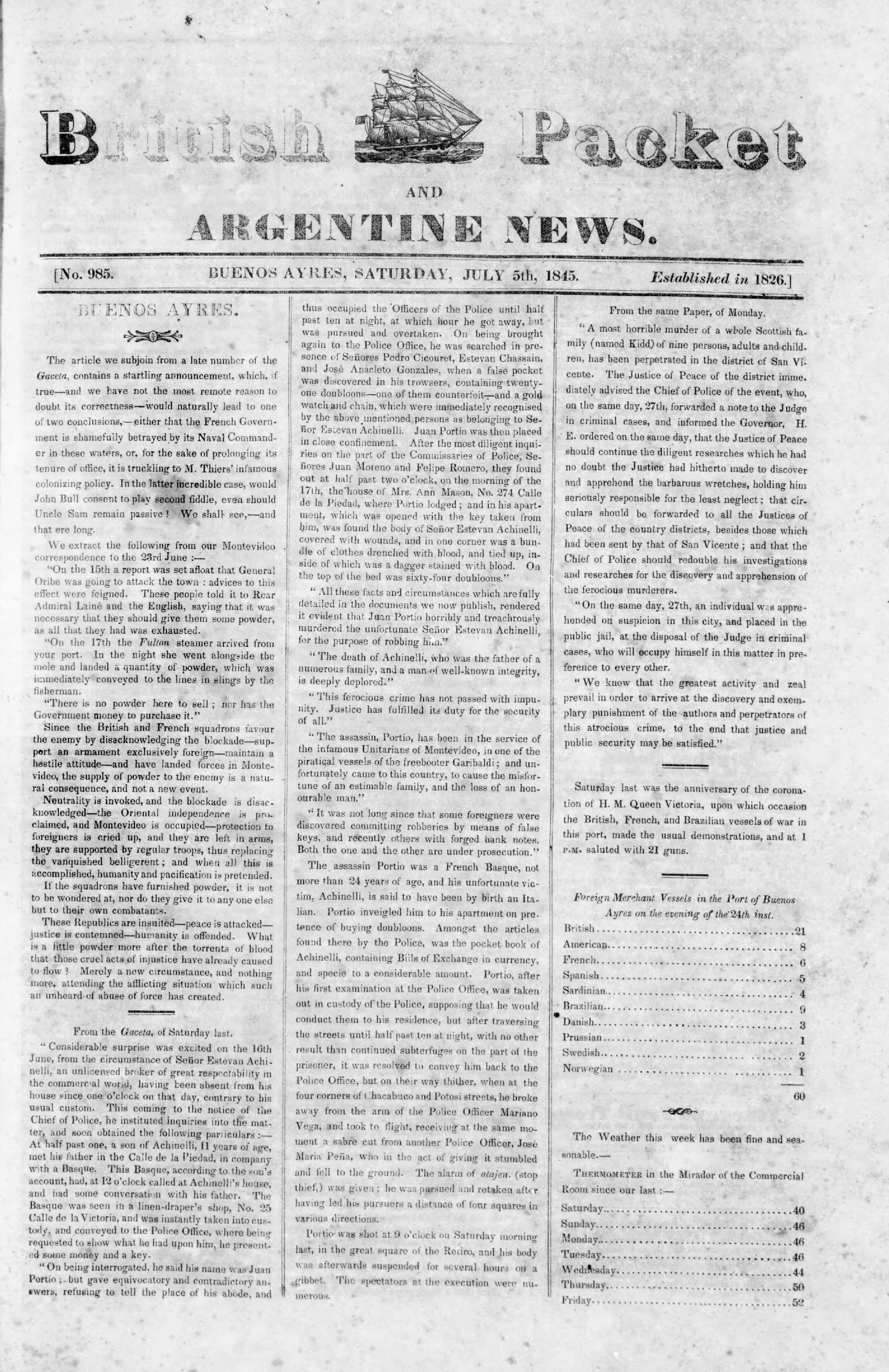
edition of Saturday July 5, 1845 with news regarding the murder of Esteban Achinelly

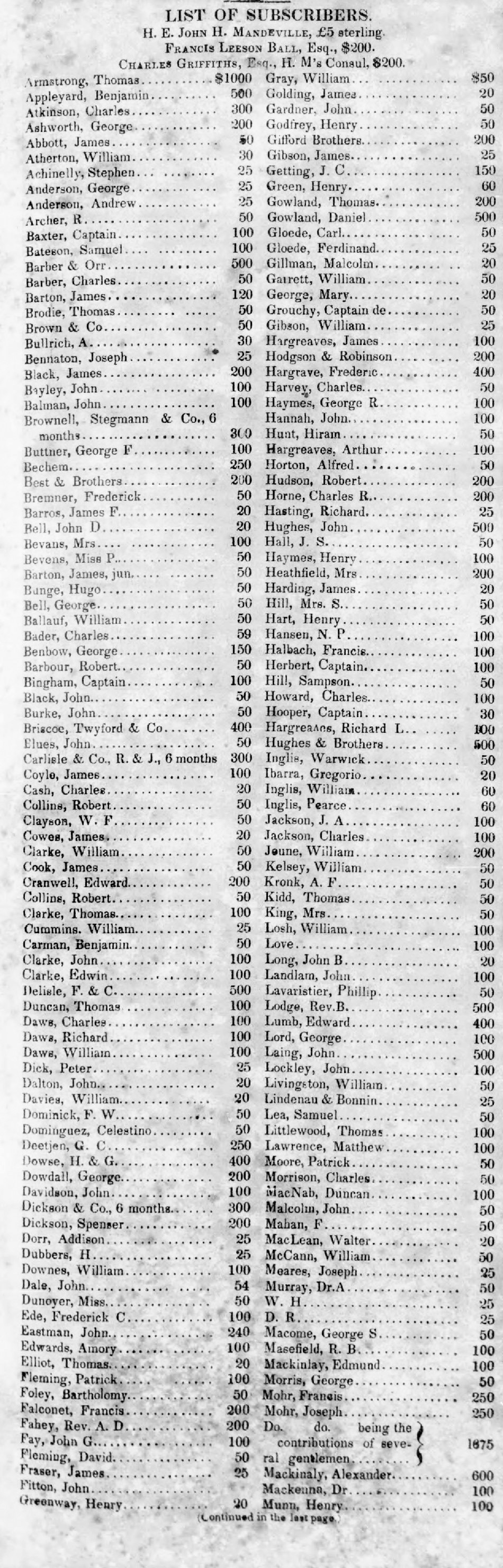
list of founding partners of British Hospital, includes the surnames Achinelly, Armstrong, Bevans and Gowland's
