= Juan Joseph de Erquicia =

Spanish politician

Escribano Juan Joseph de Erquicia

Mayor of Santiago del Estero
- In office 1790–1791
- Monarch: Charles IV
- Preceded by: Nicolás de Villacorta y Ocaña
- Succeeded by: ?

Vice-Mayor of Santiago del Estero
- In office 1789–1790
- Preceded by: Nicolás Villacorta y Ocaña
- Succeeded by: ?

Personal details
- Born: c. 1740 Santiago del Estero, Argentina
- Died: c. 1810 Santiago del Estero, Argentina
- Occupation: notary administration politician army
- Profession: notary

Military service
- Allegiance: Spanish Empire
- Branch/service: Spanish Army
- Commands: Comandante interino de Armas of Santiago del Estero

Juan José de Erquicia (c. 1740-1800s) was a Spanish politician, who served in the colonial period as Alcalde, Regidor, Escribano of Cabildo and Real Hacienda of Santiago del Estero (Argentina).

He was born in Santiago del Estero, son of a traditional family settled in the area at the beginning of the 18th century. In 1790 he was President of the Municipal Committee, and was elected Alcalde in first vote that same year. In 1792 Erquicia bought the position of Faithful Executor.

In 1798 were held the elections of Santiago del Estero, suffrages where he had been elected Regidor with only a difference of one vote in his favor. Due to allegations of electoral fraud, Erquicia and Juan Joseph de Iramain had appointed the lawyer Juan de Canaberis of Buenos Aires to exercise the defense in their names.
