= Maciel (surname) =

Maciel is a surname of Portuguese origin. Notable people with this surname include:

- Alejandro Maciel (born 1997), Argentine footballer
- Antonio Vicente Mendes Maciel or Antônio Conselheiro (1830–1897), Brazilian anti-slaver and insurrectionist priest
- Badayco Maciel (born 1981), Paraguayan football manager and former player
- Campinho Maciel (born 1986), Portuguese footballer
- Carlos Maciel (born 1946), Paraguayan football referee
- Cristhian Maciel (born 1992), Uruguayan footballer
- Eduardo da Conceição Maciel (born 1986), Brazilian footballer
- Emanuel Maciel (born 1997), Argentine footballer
- Enrique Maciel (1897–1962), Argentine musician
- Everson Maciel (born 1978), Brazilian footballer
- Fabio Deivison Lopes Maciel (born 1980), Brazilian footballer
- Francisco Maciel (disambiguation), several people
- Frédéric Maciel (born 1994), Portuguese footballer
- Jean Maciel (born 1989), Brazilian footballer
- Jeferson Gusmao Maciel (born 1986), Brazilian footballer
- Jorge Maciel (sailor) (born 1970), Spanish windsurfer
- Jorge Maciel (singer) (born 1920), Argentine singer
- Larissa Maciel (born 1977), Brazilian actress
- Leandro Maciel (born 1995), Argentine professional footballer
- Leonel Maciel (born 1939), Mexican artist
- Leonel Maciel (handballer) (born 1989), Argentine handball player
- Maciel (footballer, born 2000) (born 2000), Brazilian football midfielder known mononymously as Maciel
- Lucía Maciel (born c. 1970), Argentine actress
- Manuel Maciel (born 1984), Paraguayan footballer
- Marcial Maciel (1920–2008), Mexican founder of the Legionaries of Christ, a serial sexual abuser
  - Sexual abuse cases of Marcial Maciel
- María Mercedes Maciel Ortiz (born 1959), Mexican politician
- Marco Maciel (1940–2021), Brazilian politician
- Mateus Alves Maciel (born 1984), Brazilian footballer
- Nilto Maciel (1945–2014), Brazilian writer
- Otilia Villa Maciel (active 1951–1955), Argentine politician
- Ozéia de Paula Maciel (born 1982), Brazilian football player
- Rubens Charles Maciel (born 1979), Brazilian Jiu Jitsu (BJJ) competitor
- Sergio Maciel (1965–2008), Argentine footballer
- Thiago Maciel (born 1982), Brazilian footballer
- Ubiratan Pereira Maciel (1944–2002), Brazilian basketball player
- Yelena Maciel (born 1988), Venezuelan actress
- Walter Maciel (born 1969), Los Angeles art dealer. Art Gallery, Walter Maciel Gallery

== See also ==
- Maciel (disambiguation)
- Maciel (footballer, born 1972) (Maciel Luiz Franco), Brazilian footballer
- Maciel (footballer, born 1978) (Maciel Lima Barbosa da Cunha), Brazilian footballer
- Maciel (footballer, born 2000) (Lucas Maciel Felix), Brazilian footballer
