= Central Cemetery (disambiguation) =

Central Cemetery may refer to the following cemeteries:

- Central Cemetery of Bogotá
- Central Cemetery of Montevideo
- Central Cemetery in Szczecin
- Vienna Central Cemetery
