= Hospital Británico =

Hospital Británico (British Hospital) may refer to:

- Hospital Británico de Buenos Aires
- Hospital Británico (Montevideo)
