= Amoedo =

Amoedo or Amoêdo is a surname. Notable people with the surname include:

- Claudio Amoedo (1830–1871), Argentine physician
- Felipe Amoedo (1828–1900), Argentine politician
- Guillermo Amoedo (born 1983), Uruguayan film director and screenwriter
- João Amoêdo (born 1962), Brazilian banker, engineer and company administrator
- Rodolfo Amoedo (1857–1941), Brazilian painter, designer and decorator
- Sinforoso Amoedo (1823–1871), Argentine physician
