= General Medina =

General Medina may refer to:

- Anacleto Medina (1788–1871), Uruguayan Civil War brigadier general
- Francisco Medina (1870–1945), Argentine Army general
- Joseph V. Medina (born c. 1953), U.S. Marine Corps brigadier general
