= Francisco Maciel =

Francisco Maciel may refer to:

- Francisco Maciel (footballer) (born 1977), Argentine footballer
- Francisco Maciel (tennis) (born 1964), Mexican tennis player
- Francisco Antonio Maciel (1757–1807), Montevidean industrialist and philanthropist
