= Delmira Agustini =

Early 20th-century Uruguayan poet

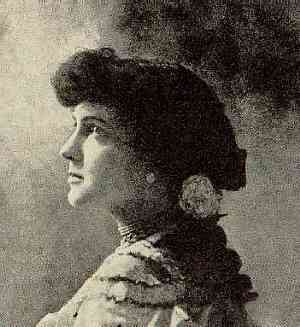
- Born: October 24, 1886; Montevideo, Uruguay
- Died: July 6, 1914 (aged 27); Montevideo, Uruguay
- Occupations: Poet; writer
- Spouse: Enrique Job Reyes
- Writing career
- Movement: Modernism

Delmira Agustini (October 24, 1886 – July 6, 1914) was a Uruguayan poet of the early 20th century.

== Biography ==
Born in Montevideo, Uruguay, she began writing when she was ten and had her first book of poems published when she was still a teenager.

She wrote for the magazine La Alborada (The Dawn). She formed part of the Generation of 1900, along with Julio Herrera y Reissig, Leopoldo Lugones and Horacio Quiroga.

Rubén Darío, a Nicaraguan poet, was an important influence for her. She looked up to him as a teacher. Darío compared Agustini to Teresa of Ávila, stating that Agustini was the only woman writer since the saint to express herself as a woman.

She specialized in the topic of female sexuality during a time when the literary world was dominated by men. Agustini's writing style is best classified in the first phase of modernism, with themes based on fantasy and exotic subjects.

Eros, god of love, symbolizes eroticism and is the inspiration to Agustini's poems about carnal pleasures. Eros is the protagonist in many of Agustini's literary works. She even dedicated her third book to him titled Los Cálices Vacíos (Empty Chalices) in 1913, which was acclaimed as her entrance into a new literary movement, "La Vanguardia" (The Vanguard).

== Personal life and death ==
She married Enrique Job Reyes on August 14, 1913. Their divorce was finalized on June 5, 1914. A month after that, Reyes fatally shot Agustini twice in the head and afterwards committed suicide. She died in her house in Montevideo, Uruguay. She is buried in the Central Cemetery of Montevideo.

== Bibliography ==
- 1907: El libro blanco
- 1910: Cantos de la mañana
- 1913: Los cálices vacíos, pórtico de Rubén Darío
- 1924: Obras completas ("Complete Works"): Volume 1, El rosario de Eros; Volume 2: Los astros del abismo, posthumously published (died 1914), Montevideo, Uruguay: Máximo García
- 1944: Poesías, prologue by Luisa Luisi (Montevideo, Claudio García & Co.)
- 1971: Poesías completas, prólogue and notes by Manuel Alvar, Barcelona: Editorial Labor

== Works translated into other languages ==
Valerie Martínez has translated many of Agustini's poems into English, and so has Diego Jourdan Pereira. Some of Agustini's poems are translated into Nepali by Suman Pokhrel, and collected in an anthology titled Manpareka Kehi Kavita.
