= Bernardo Poncini =

Swiss architect and sculptor (1814–1874)

Bernardo Poncini (1814-1874) was a Swiss architect and sculptor. He is notable for his work in Uruguay and Argentina in the mid 19th century.

Born in Ticino, he studied in Milan, at the Brera Academy.

He was active in Montevideo from 1857 till 1863, taking part in several important works:

- Cathedral of Montevideo (refurbishing, 1858)
- Independence Square, adding Doric orders (1860)
- Central Cemetery of Montevideo, rotunda (1859-1863)
- Maciel Hospital, wing facing Guaraní Street, respecting the Neoclassical style of José Toribio (1859).

In Argentina, he was active in Gualeguaychú, Entre Ríos, building its cathedral.
