= Ángel Canaveris =

Doctor Ángel Canaveris
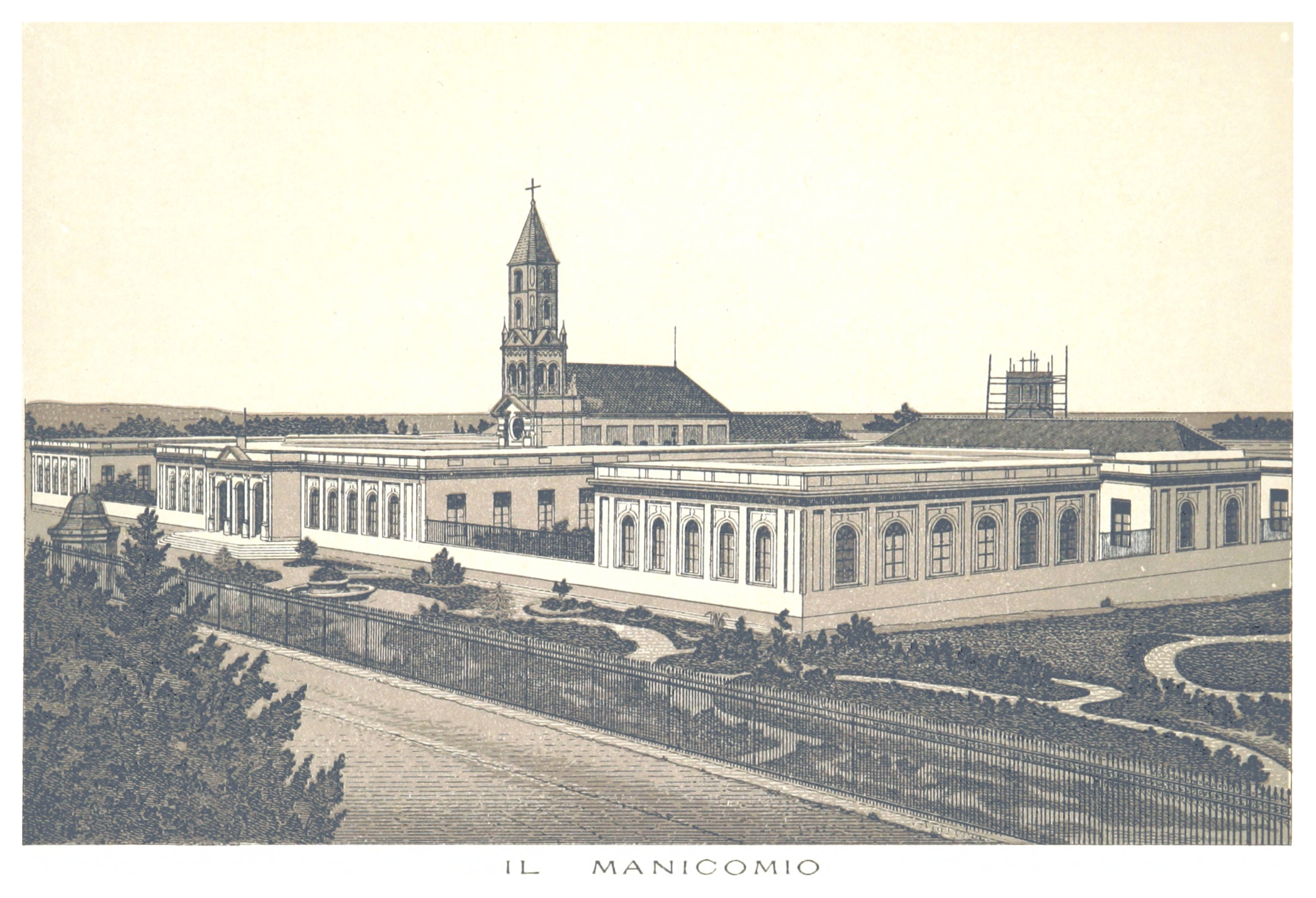
- The Hospital Vilardebó, by Giosue E. Bordoni

Director of the Hospital Vilardebó
- In office 1878–1888
- Preceded by: Pedro Visca
- Succeeded by: Alejo Martínez

Head of Hospital Maciel
- In office 1875–1878
- Preceded by: ?
- Succeeded by: ?

Personal details
- Born: c.1847 Genoa, Kingdom of Sardinia
- Died: February 24, 1897 Montevideo, Uruguay
- Spouse(s): Concepción Da Costa; Paz Da Costa
- Children: Ángel Canaveris Costa; Paz Canaveris Costa
- Occupation: pediatrics psychiatry
- Profession: doctor of medicine
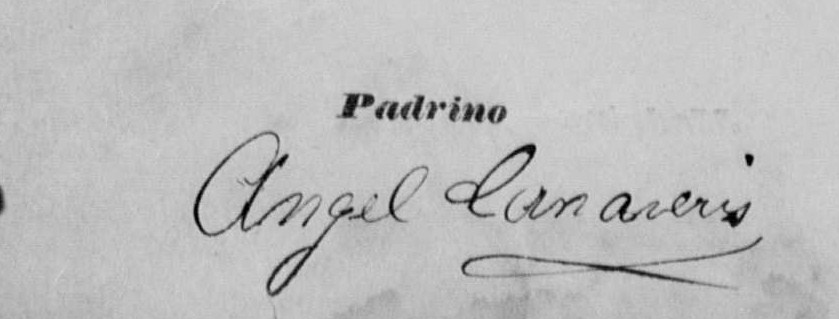
- Signature

Ángel Canaveris (c. 1847–1897) was an Argentine pediatrician and psychiatrist, who had a preponderant role in the beginnings of Uruguayan Medicine. He served in Montevideo as general director of the Hospital Vilardebó and Hospital Maciel.

== Biography ==
Ángel Canaveris was born in Italy, probably in the city of Genoa, on one of the trips made in Europe, by his parents Juan Manuel Canaveris and Carmen Gutiérrez, belonging to a distinguished family.

After completing his secondary education in the Colegio Nacional de Buenos Aires, Canaveris entered as a student in the Facultad de Medicina of the University of Buenos Aires, where he graduated in 1875 with a thesis entitled "Consideraciones sobre la lactancia" (Considerations about breastfeeding).

For the year 1875, the recent graduate Dr. Canaveris was settled in Montevideo, city where his mother was born. That same year, he was appointed by the Council of Public Hygiene, to serve in the Hospitals of Vilardebó and Maciel.

He was one of the first psychiatrists in the Mental Hospital of Uruguay. In 1878, Canaveris was appointed to fill the vacancy caused by the resignation of Pedro Visca, director of the Asylum between 1877 and 1878.

He also dedicated himself to teaching, serving as a doctor in the Internato Normal de Señoritas, since its foundation.

In 1879 the Dr. Ángel Canaveris, had promoted a resolution where the foreman should monitor that nurses do not give mistreatment of psychiatric patients. Canaveris reported that for an efficient mental treatment the patients should be contained with good treatment by their caregivers. In 1888, he resigned as Head of the Mental Hospital of Montevideo, being replaced by Dr. Alejo Martínez.

Ángel Canaveris attended the first Pan-American Congress of Medicine, held in Washington DC between September 5 and 8, 1893.

== Family ==
Ángel Canaveris was married twice, first with Concepción Da Costa Guimaraes, and second to Paz Da Costa Guimaraes, belonging to families of Portuguese roots. His mother was the daughter of Juan Gutiérrez Moreno, a distinguished doctor of medicine, born in Málaga, and Lorenza Moxica y López de Castilla, belonging to a Uruguayan Creole family.

His direct ancestor Juan de Canaveris, born in Saluzzo, but of Irish ancestry, had been one of the first benefactors of Hospital Maciel. He was also a relative of Sinforoso Amoedo, distinguished doctor of medicine, deceased during the yellow fever epidemic.
