= Francisco Pantaleón Luna =

Argentine military officer and politician

Colonel Francisco Pantaléon de Luna

Teniente Gobernador of the La Rioja Province, Argentina
- In office 1811–1814
- Succeeded by: Francisco Javier de Brizuela y Doria

Personal details
- Born: Francisco Pantaleón de Luna y Ortiz de Ocampo c. 1770 La Rioja, Argentina
- Died: 1814 La Rioja, Argentina
- Spouse: Francisca de Borja Zavaleta
- Occupation: Army politician
- Profession: Military

Military service
- Allegiance: (Spanish Empire) Spain – until 1810 (Argentina) United Provinces of the River Plate
- Branch/service: Spanish Army; Argentine Army
- Years of service: 1790–1814
- Rank: Colonel
- Battles/wars: British invasions of the River Plate; Argentine War of Independence

Francisco Pantaleón Luna (c. 1770–1814) was an Argentine military man and politician, who served as Lieutenant Governor and Commander of Arms of La Rioja Province. He had an active political participation during the end of the colonial period and also in the beginnings of Argentine independence.

== Biography ==
He was born in La Rioja province, Argentina, the son of Juan Francisco de Luna Carmona and María Juana Ortiz de Ocampo, belonging to a distinguished Creole family. He did his elementary studies in his home province to later enlist in the army.

He possibly participated in the military actions of defense and reconquest of Buenos Aires during the English Invasions, and supported the cause of the May Revolution of 1810. He also had an outstanding political performance in his native province, being military chief and lieutenant governor until 1814. Later he was appointed by Gervasio Posadas to occupy the government of Catamarca Province, without being able to assume the position by a serious illness.

Francisco Pantaleón Luna was married to Francisca de Borja Zavaleta, parents of Carmen Luna y Borja Zavaleta, who was married on 25 May 1832 in Buenos Aires with José María Canaveris Denis, son of José Canaveris and Agustina Denis, belonging to a patrician family of the city.
