= Our Lady of Mercy Church (Buenos Aires) =

Church in Argentina

Coordinates: 34°36′19.2″S 58°22′19.4″W

Our Lady of Mercy Church of Buenos Aires
- Basílica de Nuestra Señora de la Merced de Buenos Aires
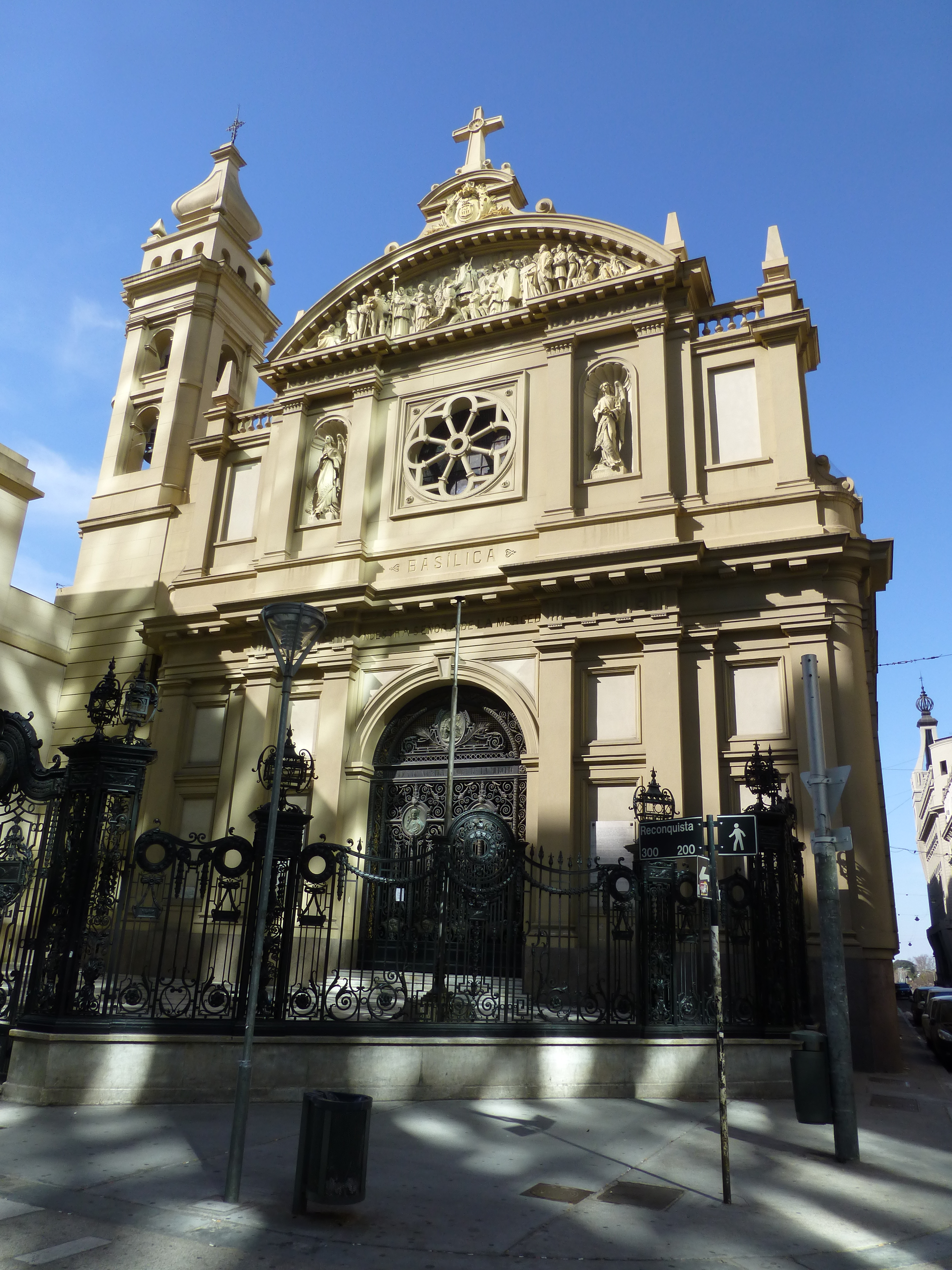
- facade of the Church of La Merced

Religion
- Affiliation: Roman Catholic
- Diocese: Buenos Aires
- Rite: Catholic
- Patron: Virgin of Mercy
- Status: Order of Mercy

Location
- Location: Reconquista 207, Buenos Aires
- Country: Argentina
- Interactive map of Our Lady of Mercy Church of Buenos Aires

Architecture
- Architects: Giovanni Battista Primoli; Giovanni Andrea Bianchi; Mario Buschiazzo
- Type: Eclecticism
- Established: 1603
- Completed: 1900

Our Lady of Mercy Church of Buenos Aires (Spanish: Basílica de Nuestra Señora de la Merced de Buenos Aires) is an Argentine Catholic church. It is located on Calle Reconquista corner of Tte. Gen. Juan Domingo Perón Street, in the neighborhood of San Nicolas in Buenos Aires.

== History ==
The church was originally designed by Italian architects Giovanni Andrea Bianchi and Giovanni Battista Primoli, who started the construction works around 1721. The current façade is the work of the architect Mario Buschiazzo, who completed the remodeling in 1900.

Like other religious buildings of the time, the church also had a cemetery, where a large number of Buenos Aires residents, politicians and soldiers were buried. Curiously, the Merced Cemetery was located in the place where the Anglican Cathedral of St. John the Baptist of Buenos Aires was built in 1830.

== Gallery ==
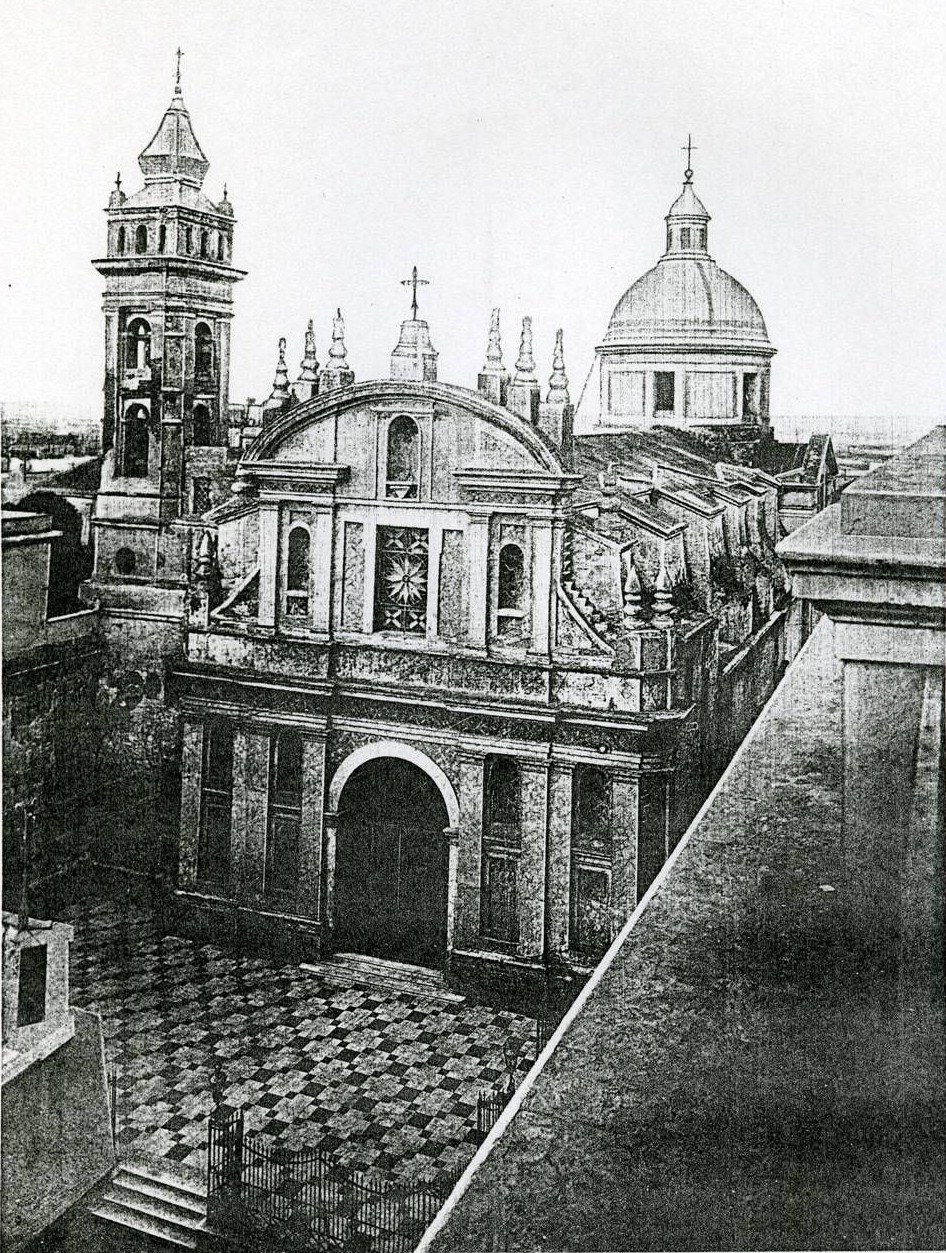
Original façade of the Church of Our Lady of Mercy of Buenos Aires (Casa Witcomb 1877).

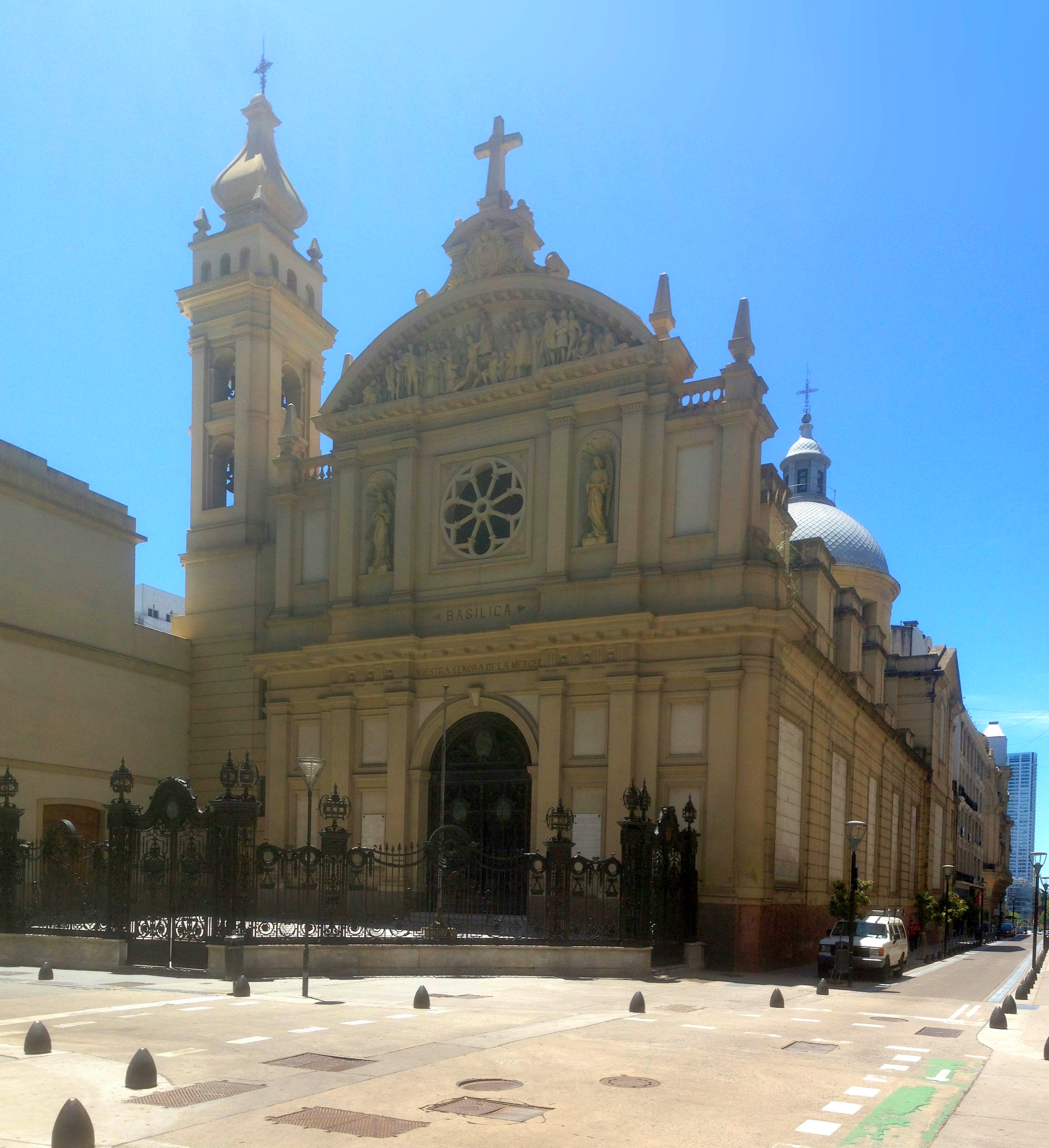
Panoramic view of the church

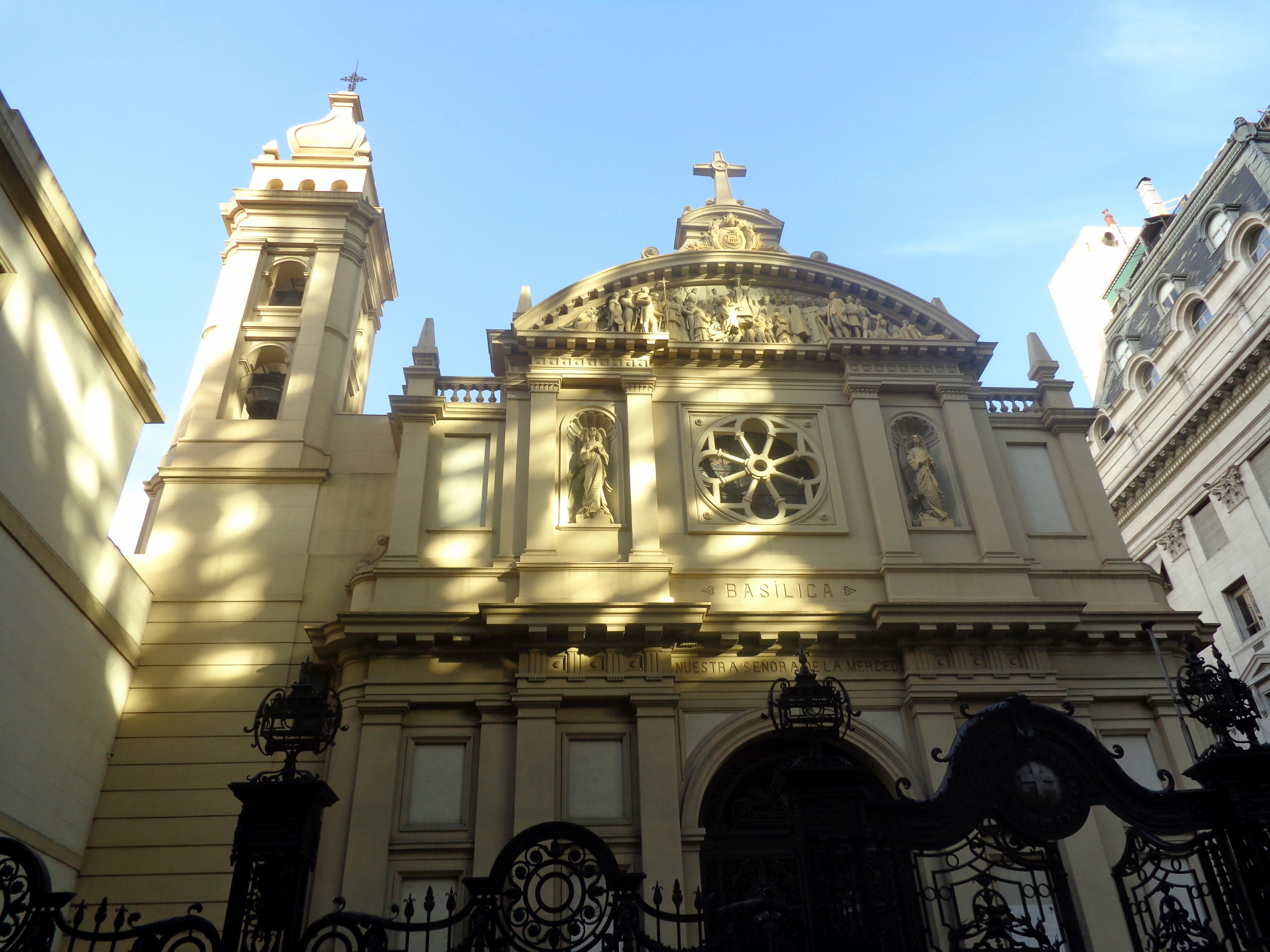
Our Lady of Mercy Basilica

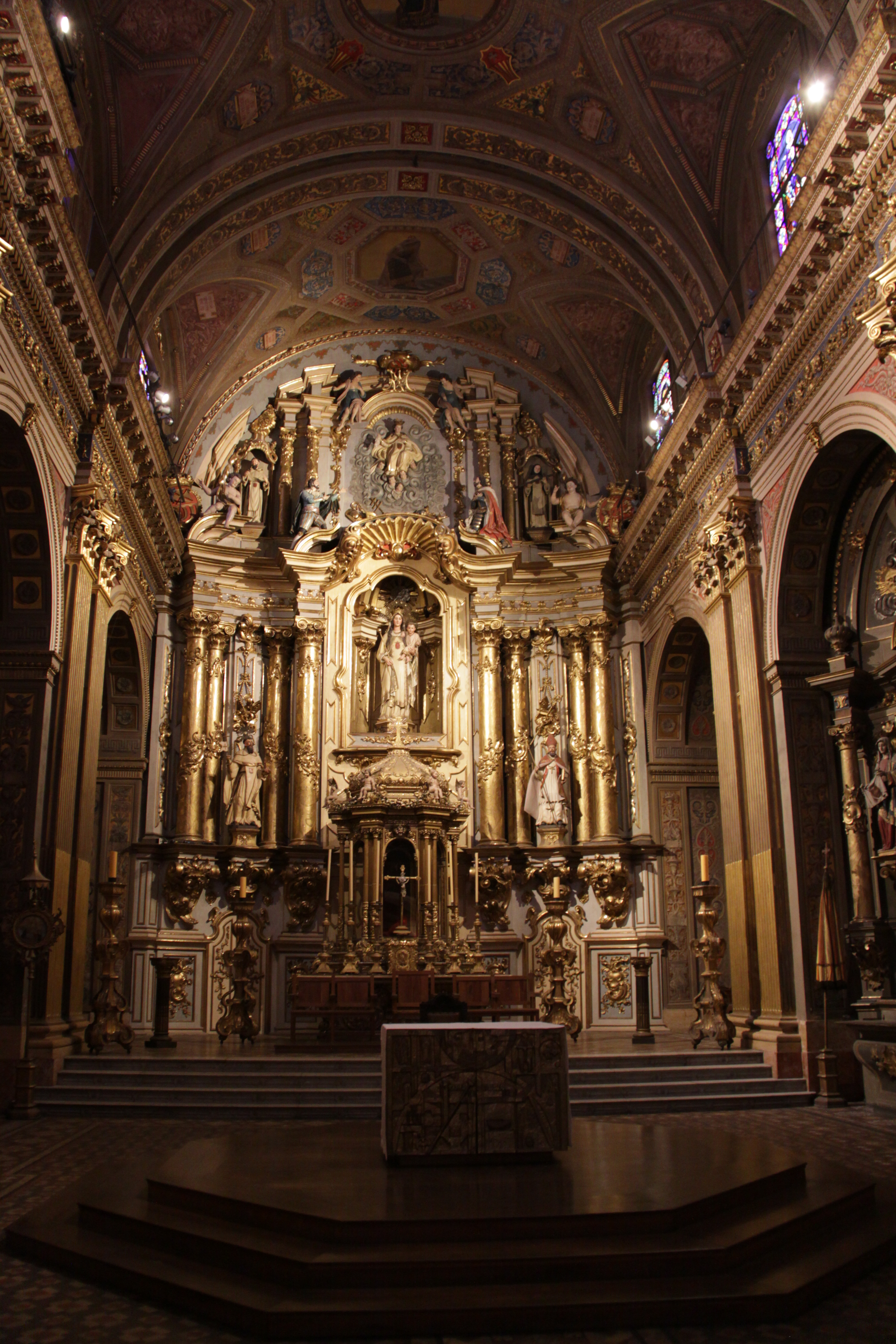
Altar of the Basilica Our Lady of Mercy
