= The Cosmopolitan (Buenos Aires) =

British weekly newspaper

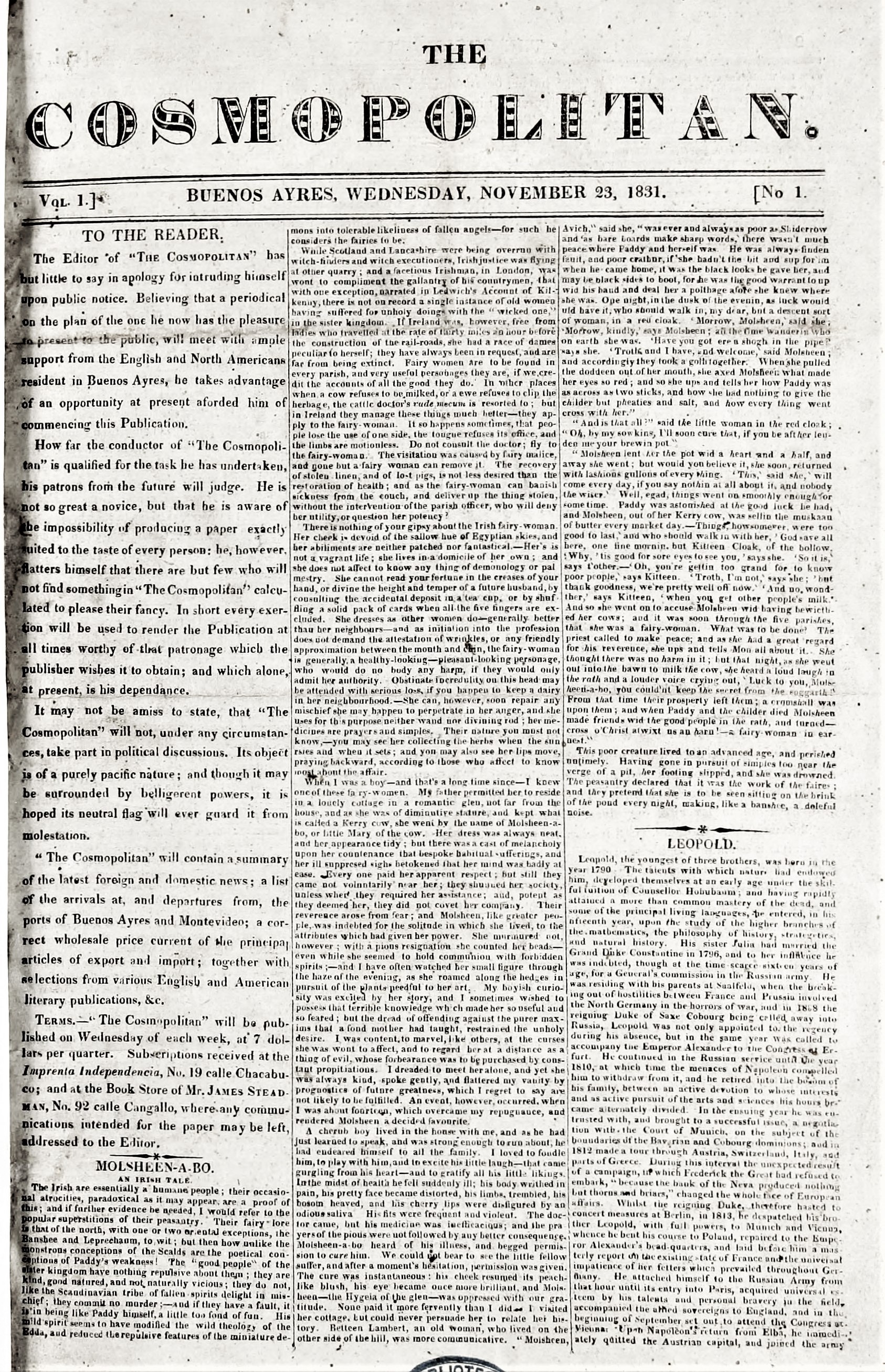
- cover of the edition of November 23, 1831
- Type: Weekly newspaper
- Publisher: Imprenta Independencia; Commercial Printing
- Editor: Agustín Francisco Wright; George A. Dillard; John K. H. Redue.
- Founded: 1831
- Ceased publication: 1833
- Language: English
- City: Buenos Aires
- Country: Argentina

The Cosmopolitan was a British weekly newspaper edited for the English speaking community of Buenos Aires.

It newspaper was published between 1831 and 1833, having its last printout on January 9 of that year. Among its editors was Agustín Francisco Wright, an Argentine journalist of English descent.
