= Central Cemetery of Montevideo =

Cemetery in Uruguay

Cementerio Central
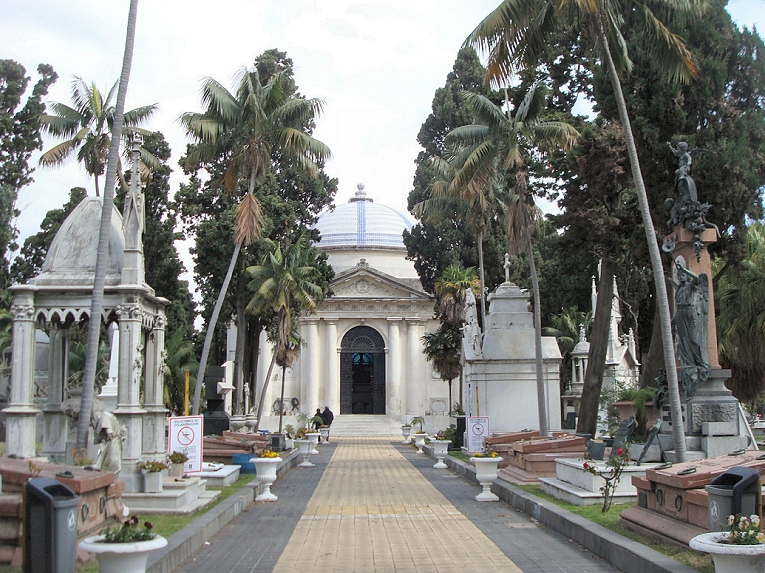
- Central Cemetery
- Interactive map of Cementerio Central

Details
- Established: 1835
- Location: Av. Gonzalo Ramírez 1302; Montevideo
- Country: Uruguay
- Coordinates: 34°54′45″S 56°11′14″W
- Find a Grave: Cementerio Central

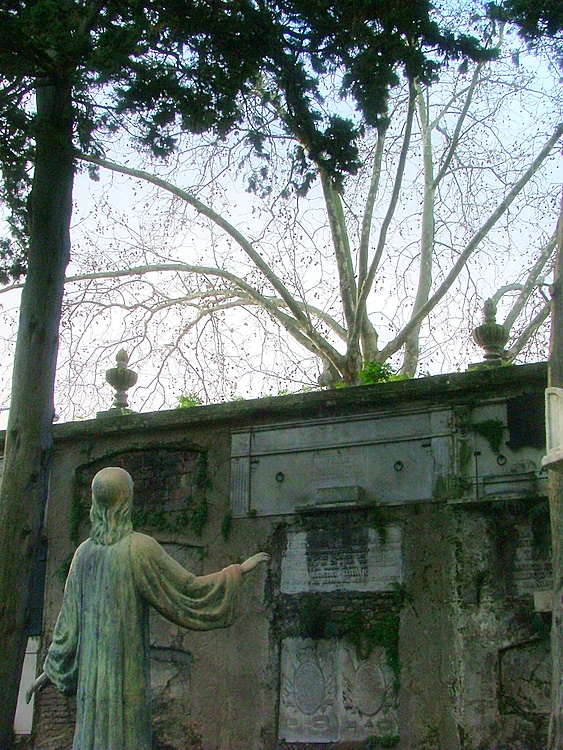
The cemetery inside

The Central Cemetery (Spanish: Cementerio central) of Barrio Sur, Montevideo, is one of the main cemeteries in Uruguay. It also ranks amongst the most popular in the country, given that most famous Uruguayan people are buried there.

It is located in the southern area of the city and it was founded in 1835. The entrance, designed and built up after the Uruguayan Civil War (1839–1852), is the work of the Italian sculptor Bernardo Poncini.

The cemetery was originally placed far away from the city, mainly because of the persistent risk of an epidemic. However, with the fast development and growth of Montevideo throughout the 20th century, the Central Cemetery is now surrounded by the metropolis.

It became quite popular after 1858. It was one of the first cemeteries in the country at a time when burials were still carried out by the Catholic Church. Some works and statues made by José Belloni and José Luis Zorrilla de San Martín can be found in the cemetery.

== Notable interments ==
Among those interred there are:

- Eduardo Acevedo
- Mario Benedetti
- Delmira Agustini
- Jorge Batlle
- Luis Batlle Berres
- José Batlle y Ordóñez
- Juan Manuel Blanes
- Zelmar Michelini
- Luis Alberto de Herrera
- Benito Nardone
- José Enrique Rodó
- Juan Zorrilla de San Martín
