= Tribunal Mayor de Cuentas de Buenos Aires =

Tribunal Mayor y Audiencia Real de Cuentas de Buenos Aires
- Established: 1769
- Dissolved: 1821
- Location: Buenos Aires
- Authorised by: Spanish Empire — until 1810 (Argentina) United Provinces of the River Plate

Tribunal Mayor de Cuentas de Buenos Aires was a governmental organism of the control of the public accounts of the Viceroyalty of the Río de la Plata.

== History ==
The Tribunal Mayor y Audiencia Real de Cuentas de Buenos Aires was created as part of the Bourbon reforms implemented by Carlos III in the territories of the Spanish Empire. It was established in 1769, and initially comprised the governorships of Buenos Aires, Tucumán and Paraguay. The hierarchical staff of the institution consisted of several contadores mayores (senior accountants), two contadores de resueltas (official accountants), and a large number of contadores ordenadores (account officers), including a notary and a "portero", in charge of the protocolary issues.

After the creation of the Viceroyalty of the Río de la Plata, the Court of Accounts of Buenos Aires, took care of the control of the public funds of all jurisdictions, of the viceroyalty including San Julian Bay and Islas Malvinas. Many of its implementations were directed by the Viceroy Pedro Antonio de Cevallos, and the Minister José de Gálvez, Visitador General of the Spanish Empire.

The officials of the court took an active part during the English invasions. His members refused to take oath to the British Crown, besides participating in the donations made for the purchase of supplies and weapons for the Creole militias of Buenos Aires. Mariano Moreno and Antonio Beruti, the sons of former officials take an active part in the revolutionary and emancipatory periods of Argentina.

The Tribunal Mayor de Cuentas de Buenos Aires was administered under the Primera Junta after the May Revolution took place. Its facilities were located inside the Fuerte de Buenos Aires, and it functioned as the organism in charge of the control of accounts of the United Provinces of the Río de la Plata until the beginning of 1820s.

== Staff ==
- Diego de la Vega - Contador Mayor
- Francisco de Cabrera - Contador Mayor
- Ramón de Oromi - Contador Mayor
- Juan Andrés de Arroyo - Contador Mayor
- Vicente García Grande y Cárdenas - Contador Mayor
- Martín Altolaguirre - Contador Mayor
- Juan Manuel Luca - Official
- Manuel Moreno y Argumosa - Official
- José Beruti - Official
- Tirso Martínez - Notary
- Juan de Canaveris - Official portero
