= Escuadrón de Carabineros de Carlos IV =

- Active: 1806
- Disbanded: 1810
- Country: Argentina
- Allegiance: Spain
- Branch: Spanish Army
- Type: Cavalry
- Garrison/HQ: Fuerte de Buenos Aires
- Engagements: British invasions of the River Plate; May Revolution

Escuadrón de Carabineros de Carlos IV was a Spanish cavalry squadron raised in Buenos Aires during the British invasions of the River Plate.

== History ==
This cavalry militia unit was created on November 22, 1806, bearing the name of Carlos IV, in honor of the King of Spain. It was composed of 190 men divided into three cavalry companies. Its commander was Benito Rivadavia, a lawyer and merchant born in Galicia, who participated in the command of this unit in the reconquest of Buenos Aires during the first British invasion of the River Plate.

During the second invasion, its commander was Lucas Fernández, an Andalusian merchant, who financed the expenses of the Escuadrón de Carabineros de Carlos IV. It was dissolved by order of the Governing Board after the May Revolution.
