= Ernest Rouquaud =

Ernest Rouquaud Keenton
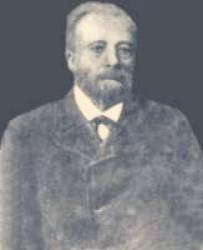

Personal details
- Born: February 24, 1822 Lot-et-Garonne, France
- Died: May 10, 1907 (aged 85) Buenos Aires, Argentina
- Spouse: Marie Louise Périchon Castex
- Occupation: manufacturer industrial
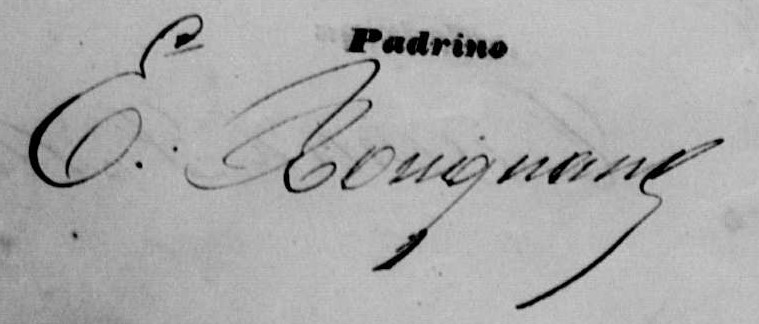
- Signature

Ernest Rouquaud (1822–1907) was a French trader, settler and colonizer of Argentine Patagonia. In 1871 he obtained the concession of the Argentine Government in to found a colony in Santa Cruz Province.

== Biography ==
He was born in Montgiscard, France, son of Jacques Rouquaud and Julia Keenton, belonging to a family of Anglo-French roots. He had reached the Río de la Plata in 1841, during the government of Juan Manuel de Rosas. In his early years in Argentina, Rouquaud was the owner of an industrial establishment located in the suburbs of Avellaneda (Buenos Aires Province) where processed livestock products.

Rouquaud was linked with Luis Piedrabuena, a pioneer in the exploration of southern Argentina. In 1872, the President Domingo Faustino Sarmiento granted to Ernest Rouquaud, a concession in Santa Cruz Province. He aspired to colonize and exploit marine resources of the South Argentine. On January 22, 1872, sailed from Buenos Aires the boat "Roebuck", of nine hundred tons, toward the Patagonia.

Installed in the Patagonian territory the Rouquaud family, had planned to install a fishery industry, plus two establishments for the manufacture of oil. In 1872 the Argentine Congress granted him a concession of fifty leagues in located on both banks of the Santa Cruz River.

Ernest Rouquaud had commercial relations with the inhabitants of the Falkland Islands (Islas Malvinas). In 1873 he arrived at the islands aboard the English schooner, the Tucutayú, with the intention of buying cattle to the Kelpers. Through his brother, Pablo Germán Rouquaud, his last name is linked to Luis Vernet and Greenleaf Cilley, governor and military commander of the Malvinas prior to the British dominance.

Rouqaud's enterprise in Patagonia didn't end up well: Facing constant pressures from the Chilean Government, which at the time, did not recognise Argentinian sovereignty south of Santa Cruz River-family tragedies and lack of success in his business, he was forced to abandon his colony in 1874.

== Family ==
Ernest Rouquaud was married on August 2, 1843, in Buenos Aires Cathedral to María Luisa Périchon, daughter of Luis Périchon and Catalina Castex, belonging to a French family from Paris. He and his wife were the parents of numerous children, including Eloisa Rouquaud Périchon (1843), wife of Alfonso Lennuyeux, Julia Rouquaud Périchon, mother of Augusto Mallié Rouquaud, Ernesto Rouquaud Périchon (1854-1874), Pablo Rouquaud Périchon, Elisa Rouquaud Périchon, Alfonso Rouquaud Périchon, Emilio Rouquaud Périchon, Augusto Rouquaud Périchon (1863-1928), Julio Rouquaud Périchon, Maria Luisa Rouquaud Périchon and Matilde Luisa Rouquaud Périchon, married to Juan Broussain Garat, son Pedro Broussain and Gracianne Garat, natives of France.

His son, Pablo Rouquaud, died drowned in Santa Cruz River. His wife, María Luisa Perichon, died in 1872 in Corpen Aike at the age of 47.
