= Maciel Monteiro =

Maciel Monteiro may refer to:

- Tomás Antônio Maciel Monteiro, 1st Baron of Itamaracá, Brazilian politician and magistrate
- Antônio Peregrino Maciel Monteiro, 2nd Baron of Itamaracá, Brazilian poet, medician, diplomat and politician
- Wallyson Ricardo Maciel Monteiro, Brazilian soccer player
