= Church of San Miguel de Arcangel (Buenos Aires) =

Catholic church in Buenos Aires, Argentina

Church of San Miguel de Arcángel
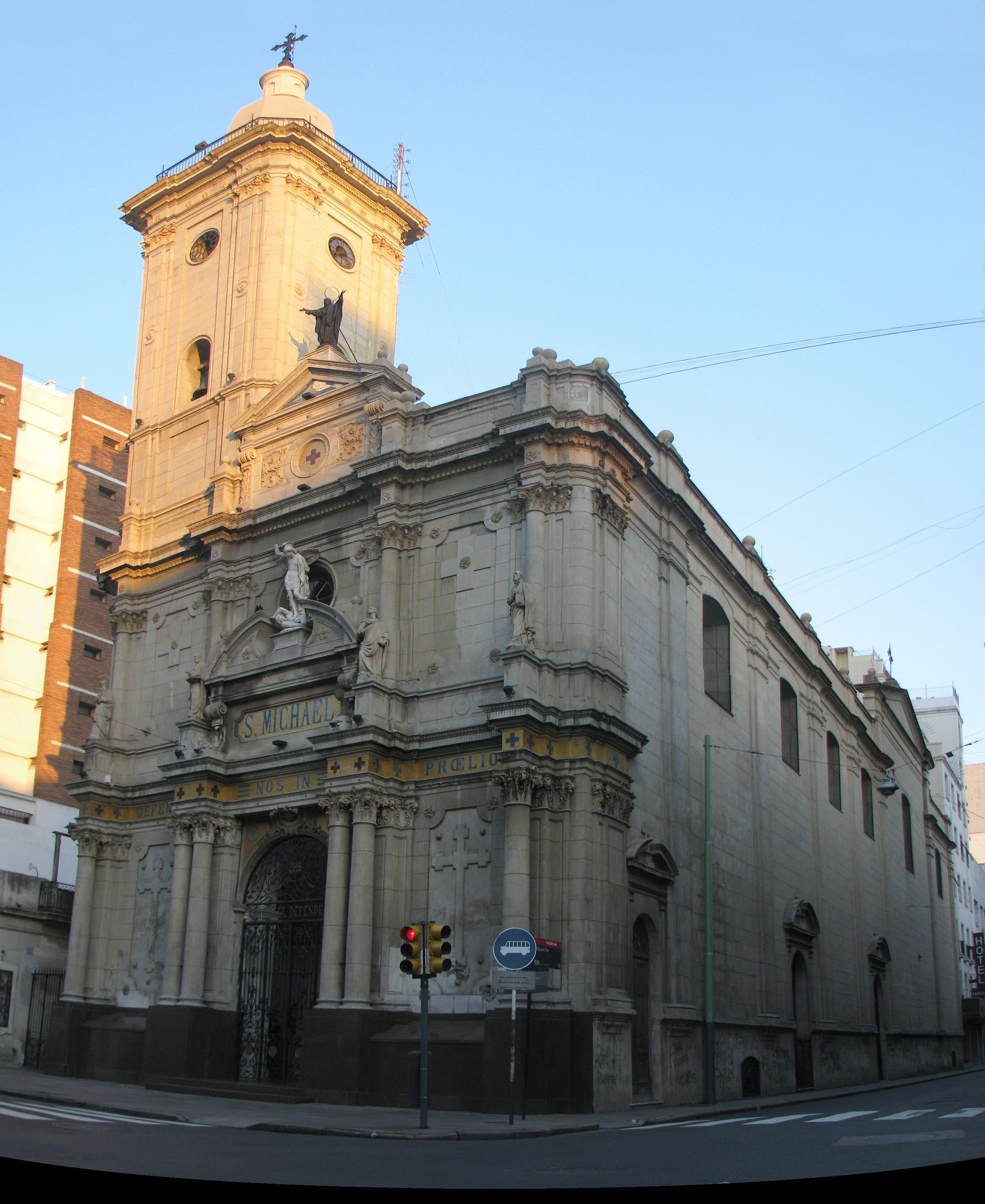
- Facade of San Miguel

Religion
- Rite: Catholic
- Patron: Saint Michael the Archangel

Location
- Location: Corner of Bartolomé Mitre and Suipacha, San Nicolás, Buenos Aires
- Country: Argentina
- Interactive map of Church of San Miguel de Arcángel
- Coordinates: 34°36′27″S 58°22′45″W

Architecture
- Architects: César Ferrari, current facade
- Style: Renaissance
- Funded by: Juan Guillermo González
- Established: 1830
- Completed: 1916

Church of San Miguel de Arcángel is a Catholic church in Buenos Aires, Argentina, declared a national historic monument in 1983.

== History ==
The first chapel was built around 1730 by the initiative of Juan Guillermo González y Aragón, a distinguished Spanish gentleman who after being widowed was dedicated to the priesthood. The Church of San Miguel was initially founded as Nuestra Señora de los Remedios, being elevated to parish in 1830 and bearing the name of Saint Michael the Archangel as patron.

Clashes between Spanish and British troops took place during the second British invasion of the River Plate on the street on which the church is located. The current façade is the work of César Augusto Ferrari, who started remodeling works in 1912.
