= Bernabé González Bueno =

Spanish politician

Ministro de la Real Hacienda of Buenos Aires
- In office 1792–1794
- Monarch: Charles IV of Spain
- Preceded by: ?
- Succeeded by: ?

Ministro de la Real Hacienda of Paraguay
- In office 1803–1807
- Monarch: Charles IV of Spain
- Preceded by: José Joaquín Goiburú
- Succeeded by: ?

Personal details
- Born: c. 1760 Madrid, Spain
- Died: c. 1820 Asunción, Paraguay
- Spouse: María Gregoria de la Peña y Franco
- Occupation: government
- Profession: accountant
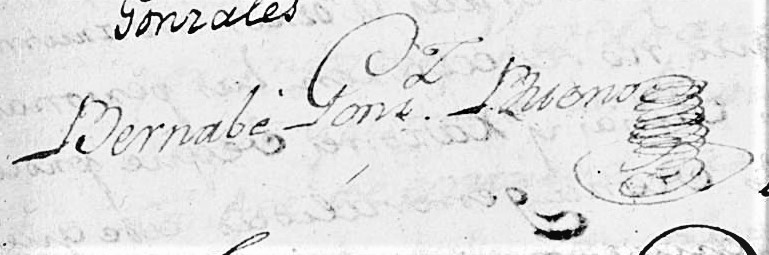
- Signature

Bernabé González Bueno (c. 1760 – c. 1820) was a Spanish politician, who served during the colonial period of Argentina and Paraguay as Minister of the Royal Hacienda of Buenos Aires and Asunción.

He worked as a public accountant, and beginning his career as a clerk at the Real Hacienda around 1778. He had an active participation in the administration of the Cajas Reales (Royal treasury) until the end of the Viceroyalty of the Río de la Plata.
