= Martín Grandoli =

Argentine politician

Vice Mayor of Buenos Aires
- In office 1803–1804
- Preceded by: ?
- Succeeded by: ?

Fiel Ejecutor of the Cabildo of Buenos Aires
- In office 1817–1818
- Preceded by: Manuel de Lezica
- Succeeded by: Félix Castro

Regidor of the Cabildo of Buenos Aires
- In office 1810–1818

Alcalde de barrio Cuartel 6° (Buenos Aires)
- In office 1810–1811
- Preceded by: ?
- Succeeded by: ?

Personal details
- Born: Martín Grandoli y Ximénez Gaitán c. 1765 Santa Fe, Argentina
- Died: c. 1830 Buenos Aires, Argentina
- Spouse(s): María Juana Pando Basualdo; María Dionisia de Borja Nazarre
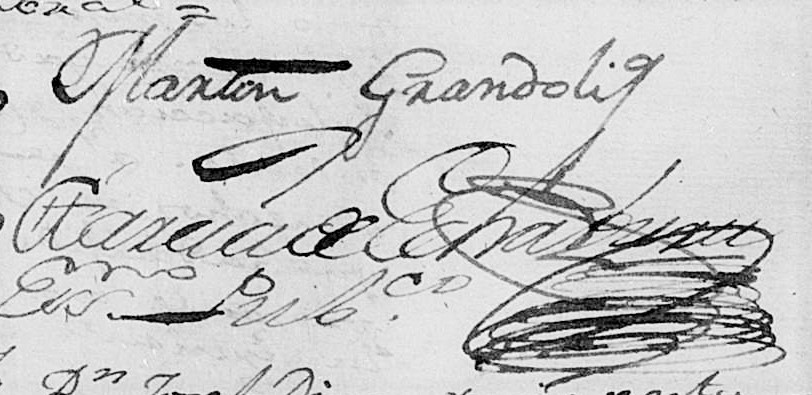
- Signature

Military service
- Allegiance: Spain – until 1810 (Argentina) United Provinces of the River Plate
- Years of service: 1806–1810
- Battles/wars: British invasions of the Río de la Plata; May Revolution

Martín Grandoli (c. 1765 – c. 1830) was an Argentine politician, who served as regidor and alcalde of Buenos Aires. He had a preponderant political role during the colonial and post colonial period of Argentina.

He was born in Santa Fe the son of Pedro Pablo Grandoli and María Ximénez y Gaitán, belonging to a distinguished family from Malta and Buenos Aires Province. He was married twice, first with María Juana Pando, daughter of Bartolomé Pando and Bárbara Basualdo, and second to María Dionisia de Borja, daughter of Antonio Nazarre Velasco, born in Huesca, Spain, and Teresa Pérez de Asiain, born in Buenos Aires.
