= Cuerpo de Quinteros y Labradores =

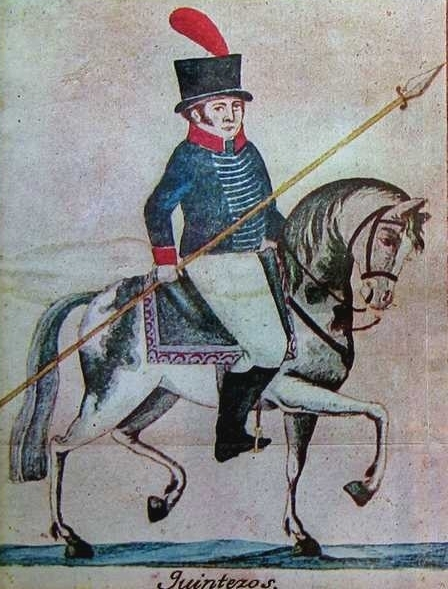
- Uniform of the battalion of Quinteros and Labradores according to an 1807 drawing
- Disbanded: 1810
- Country: Argentina
- Allegiance: Spanish Empire
- Type: cavalry
- Engagements: British invasions of the River Plate

Cuerpo de Quinteros y Labradores (Corps of farmers and Labradors) was a military unit of cavalry formed on the occasion of the British invasions of the Río de la Plata.

== History ==
This military unit was formed by farmers of the province of Buenos Aires, being their Commanders in chiefs Don Antonio Luciano de Ballester, a rich landowner, born in Buenos Aires, and Juan Clavería, born in Escou, France.

The Corps of Quinteros and Labradores had two squads with volunteers from the haciendas of Buenos Aires. They were divided into six companies, to fulfill surveillance missions. Its armament consisted in spears, swords and some pistols and carbines, provided by farmers.

== Distinción Real ==
List of the members of the Cuerpo de Quinteros y Labradores who were distinguished (promotions) in the name of Fernando VII of España, for their heroic action in the defense of Buenos Aires against the English troops.

- Antonio Luciano Ballester - teniente coronel
- Juan Clavería - teniente coronel
- José López Brizuela - capitán
- Tomás de Arana - capitán
- Domingo Antonio Santiago - capitán
- José Antonio Rosende - capitán
- Miguel Busquet - capitán
- Francisco Palón - capitán
- Luciano de Barreda - capitán
- José Canaveris - teniente
- Vicente Lastra - teniente
- Juan José Albana - teniente
- Antonio Salvañac - teniente
- Ramón Uriarte - teniente
- Pedro Blanco - teniente
- Anacleto de las Cajigas - teniente
- Francisco Sarracan - teniente
- José Reyes - teniente
- Manuel Amat - teniente
- Francisco Olascuaga - alférez
- Miguel Toro - alférez
- Pedro Posadas - alférez
- Juan Rosende - alférez
- José Díaz - alférez
- Francisco Bastos - alférez
