= Juan Joseph de Iramain =

Juan José Iramain

Alcalde of Santiago del Estero
- In office 1780–1781
- Monarch: Charles III

Personal details
- Born: Juan José de Iramain Santillán c.1750 Santiago del Estero, Viceroyalty of Peru
- Died: 1808 Santiago del Estero, Viceroyalty of the Rio de la Plata
- Occupation: Politician merchant landowner
- Profession: Military man

Military service
- Allegiance: Spanish Empire
- Branch/service: Milicias Provinciales de Santiago del Estero
- Years of service: c.1770–1808
- Rank: Captain
- Battles/wars: British invasions of the River Plate

Juan José de Iramain (c.1750–1808) was a Spanish military, politician, merchant and landowner. He served as Governor of Arms, Subdelegate Intendant and Sub-Delegate of Real Hacienda and Guerra of Santiago del Estero.

== Biography ==
Iramain was born in Santiago del Estero (Argentina), son of Agustín de Iramain and Josefa de Santillán. His father born in Potosí, had arrived in the city of Santiago del Estero about 1750. Iramain was married twice, first to Paula López de Velasco. And second with Pascuala Bailona Díaz Gallo, sister of Pedro León Gallo, one of the signatories of the Argentine Declaration of Independence.

In 1770s Juan Joseph de Iramain had been promoted to Lieutenant colonel (Captain) of the 1° regiment. In 1780 he was elected Alcalde in first vote, and was appointed Governor of Arms of Santiago del Estero in 1786. During the British invasions, Iramain commanded the militias of Santiago del Estero, participating heroically of the defense and reconquest of Buenos Aires. He had led one of the two militia companies, made up of Cavalry volunteers sent from their home province.
