= Hospital Maciel =

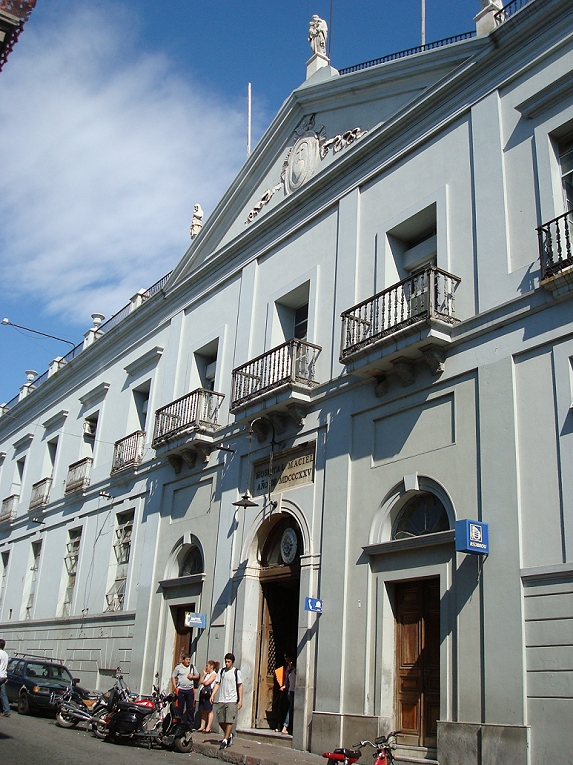
- Hospital Maciel, 25 de Mayo Str.

Geography
- Location: Calle 25 de Mayo 174, Ciudad Vieja, Montevideo, Uruguay
- Coordinates: 34°54′30″S 56°12′43″W

Organisation
- Care system: Public
- Type: General

Services
- Emergency department: Yes 24 hours

History
- Former name: Hospital de San José de la Caridad
- Founded: 1825 (actual)

Hospital Maciel is a hospital located in 25 de Mayo 174, Old City in Montevideo. It is one of the oldest hospitals in Uruguay. The land was originally donated in Spanish colonial times by philanthropist Francisco Antonio Maciel, who teamed up with Mateo Vidal to establish a hospital and charity. The first building was extended between 1781 and 1788, and later expanded on over time. The actual building is dated to 1825 with the plans of José Toribio (son of Tomás Toribio) and later Bernardo Poncini (wing on the Guaraní street, 1859), Eduardo Canstatt (corner of Guaraní and 25 de Mayo) and Julián Masquelez (1889). The hospital has a temple, the Charity Chapel, built in Greek style by Miguel Estévez in 1798.

== Images ==
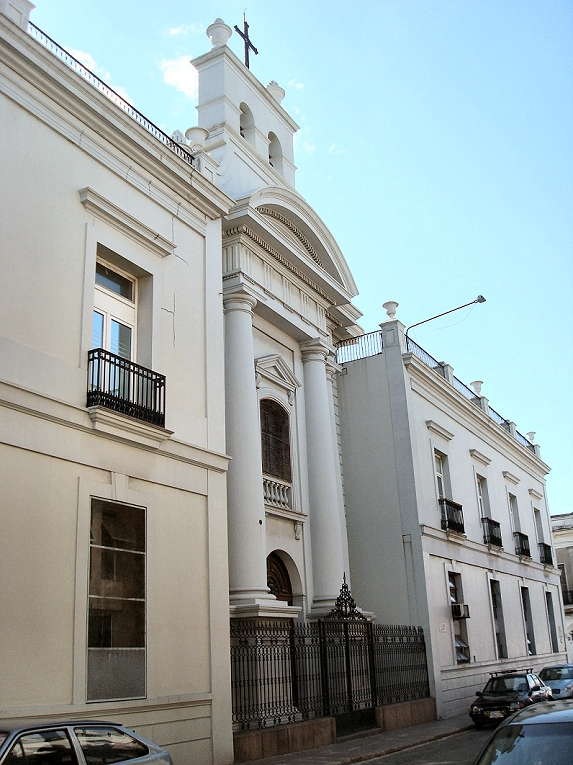
Hospital Maciel, Francisco Maciel Str.jpg
