= Francisco Medina =

Argentine general (1870–1945)

General Francisco Medina
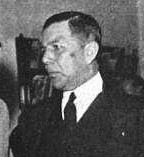

Minister of War of the Argentina
- In office 1930–1932
- Preceded by: Manuel A. Rodríguez
- Succeeded by: ?

Personal details
- Born: September 12, 1870 Buenos Aires, Argentina
- Died: Buenos Aires, Argentina July 12, 1945
- Resting place: La Recoleta Cemetery
- Spouse: Elvira Lamela Canavery
- Occupation: Military man
- Profession: Army

Military service
- Allegiance: Argentina
- Branch/service: Argentine Army
- Years of service: 1888-1932
- Rank: General
- Battles/wars: Conquest of the Desert; Conquest of the Chaco

Francisco Medina (12 September 1870 - 12 July 1945) was an Argentine military man who served as Minister of War during the presidency of José Félix Uriburu.

== Biography ==
He was born in Buenos Aires, the son of Francisco Medina, born in Montevideo, and Rosa Buasso, daughter of a Genoese family. He was married to Elvira Lamela Canavery, daughter of Lieutenant Colonel Baldomero Lamela Luengo, and Elvira Canavery, belonging to a family of Irish descent.

He was promoted to General de Brigada in 1923 and to General of División in 1929. He spent most of his military career in southern Argentina, where he participated in the last military campaigns of the Conquest of the Desert.

General Francisco Medina took an active part in the de facto government of José Félix Uriburu and Agustín Pedro Justo.
