= Sinforoso Amoedo =

Argentine medical doctor

Doctor Sinforoso Amoedo Canaveri
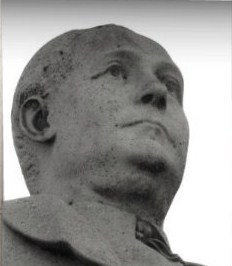
- Bust of Dr. S. Amoedo in La Recoleta Cemetery

Personal details
- Born: Sinforoso del Carmen Amoedo y Canaveri; 1823 Buenos Aires, Argentina
- Died: 1871 (aged 47–48) Buenos Aires, Argentina
- Resting place: La Recoleta Cemetery
- Party: National Autonomist Party
- Occupation: Doctor
- Profession: medicine
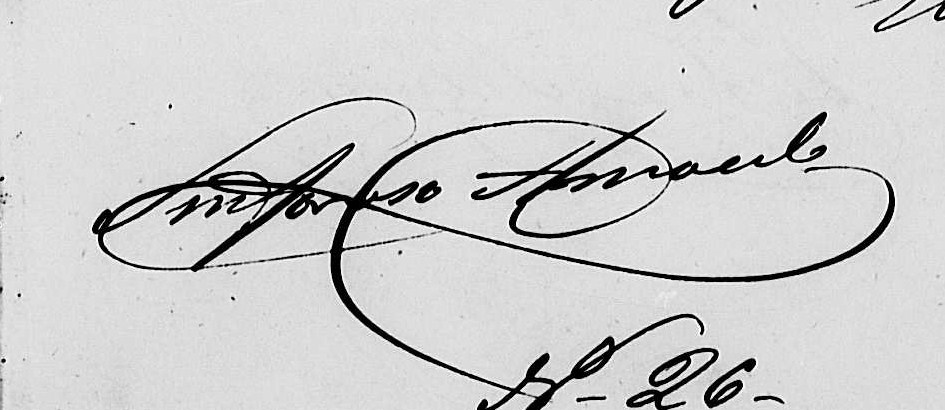
- Signature

Sinforoso Amoedo (July 18, 1823 – April 23, 1871) was an Argentine medical doctor. He served during the yellow fever epidemic of 1871.

== Early life and education ==
Sinforoso del Carmen Amoedo Canaveri was born July 18, 1823, in Buenos Aires, the son of Hilario Amoedo Garazatúa and Juana Josefa Canaveris Esparza, belonging to a Patrician family of Buenos Aires. His high school studies were at the Colegio Republicano. He studied medicine at the University of Buenos Aires where he received his M.D.

== Career ==
In addition to practicing as a doctor, he exercised some minor political positions, included municipal elector of the Concepción in 1865 by decree issued by the interim president Marcos Paz. Since the beginning of his career he had practiced medicine in the area of Concepción, current neighborhood of Constitución. He had an active participation during the cholera epidemic that hit Argentina in 1867, also taking part in the fight against the yellow fever epidemic of 1871.

Sinforoso Amoedo had a natural son named Joaquín Ramón Amoedo, who served for several periods as Intendente municipal of Quilmes. He died of yellow fever on April 23, 1871, being buried in the Cementerio de la Recoleta. His family received a posthumous award for his heroic work in the fight against the epidemic.

Sinforoso Amoedo was a contemporary of distinguished medical professionals, including Carlos Furst, Guillermo Rawson and Juan Antonio Argerich. His comrades Aurelio French, Ventura Bosch, Adolfo Argerich and other distinguished professionals also died during the yellow fever epidemic.
