= Francisco Antonio Maciel =

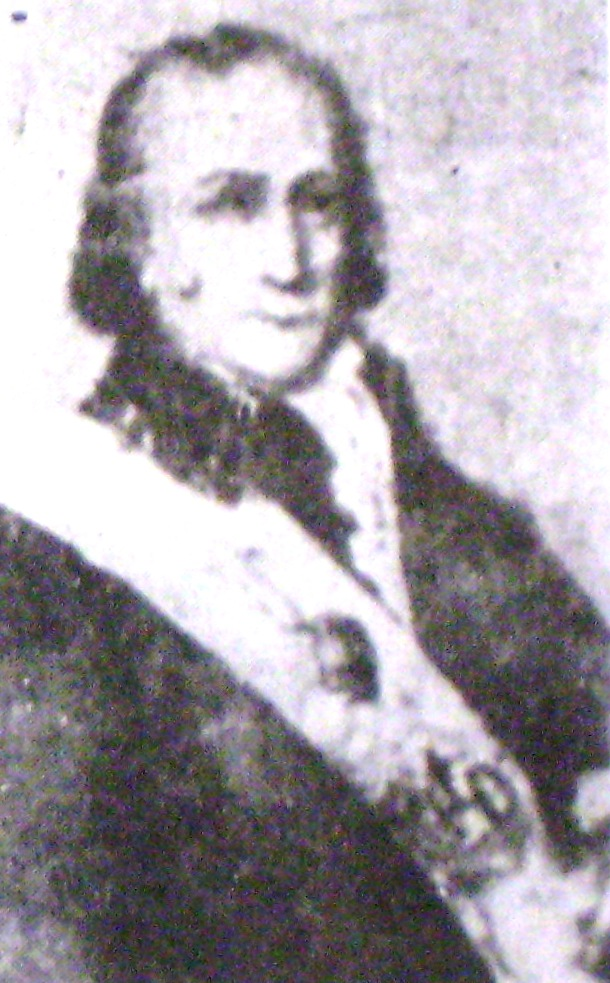

Francisco Antonio Maciel (September 16, 1757 – January 20, 1807 in Montevideo), was a Montevidean Criollo industrialist and philanthropist of the time of the Spanish colony. He was known as the "father of the poor."

He was born into a prominent family in colonial Montevideo, originally from the Canary Islands. He built a farm on the banks of the Miguelete Stream, where he had a chapel built years later.

At one point he felt the urgent need for a hospital in Montevideo, and Maciel founded the Maciel hospital, using his own resources. In 1787 it had a hall with eleven beds to help the sick. He was also the founder of the Brotherhood of Charity institution.

He fought during the English invasions and died in the Cardal in battle whilst defending his city.

Maciel's name would also go down in Uruguayan history when the Maciel Chapel was named after him in December 1813.
