= Hospital Británico de Buenos Aires =

Hospital in Buenos Aires, Argentina

Coordinates: 34°38′03″S 58°23′15″W

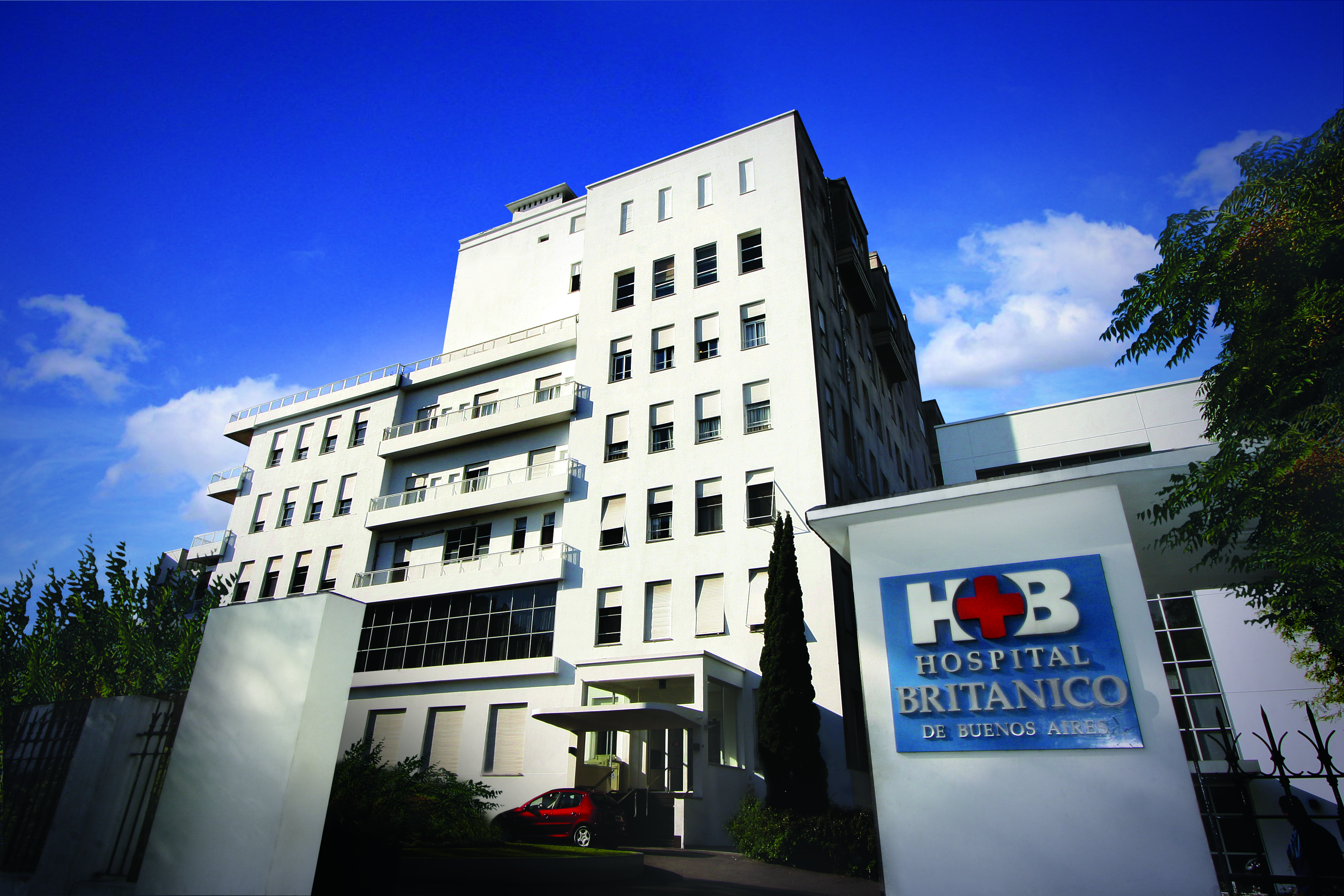

Hospital Británico de Buenos Aires (English: Buenos Aires British Hospital) is a hospital in Buenos Aires, Argentina.

== Notable patients who have been in the hospital ==
- Gordon Stretton, English singer, died on May 3, 1983
- Alberto Laiseca, Argentine writer, died on February 27, 2017
