= Manuel Canaveris =

Argentine army officer

Teniente Manuel de Canaveris

Personal details
- Born: Manuel Josse Ramón Cornelio Jugluns de Canaveris y Esparza c. 1787 Buenos Aires
- Died: c. 1825 Buenos Aires
- Resting place: Cementerio del Norte
- Party: Partido Federal
- Spouse: María de los Ángeles Rodríguez y Calderón de la Barca
- Relatives: Sinforoso Canaveri (grandson); Isabelino Canaveris (grandson); Saturnino Canaveri (great-grandson); Juan José Rocha y Esparza (cousin); Juan Manuel Bayá (nephew); Claudio Amoedo (nephew); Felipe Amoedo (nephew); Pedro Nolasco García (relative-in-law)
- Occupation: army farmer merchant
- Profession: military man
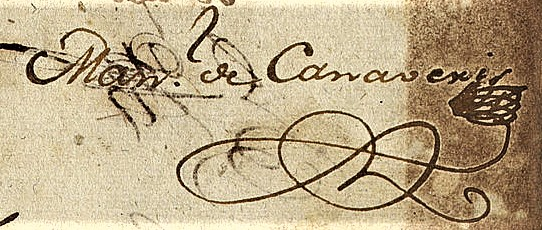
- Signature

Military service
- Allegiance: (Spanish Empire) Spain – until 1810 (Argentina) United Provinces of the River Plate
- Branch/service: Spanish Army; Argentine Army
- Years of service: 1806-1812
- Rank: Lieutenant
- Commands: Tercio de Cántabros Montañeses; Regimiento N° 4 de Infantería; Regimiento de Patricios
- Battles/wars: British invasions of the Río de la Plata; Mutiny of Álzaga; May Revolution; Argentine War of Independence

Manuel Canaveris (c. 1787– c. 1825) was an Argentine army officer, who took part in the defense and reconquest of Buenos Aires during the English Invasions. He served under Colonel Ignacio Álvarez Thomas in the 4th Regiment of Buenos Aires, participating in the Campaigns to the Interior of the Provinces of 1810.

He also served in the garrison of the city as 2nd Lieutenant of the 7th Battalion of Fusiliers of the 2nd Regiment of Patricians. He and his family had an active participation during the British invasions of the River Plate and May Revolution. His father was one of the neighbors who attended the Open Cabildo of May 22, 1810.

He was the only member of the Canaveris Esparza family to dedicate himself entirely to the militia. His sons were linked to families Blanco, Ferrer, Michelena, Pelliza and Torres, outstanding soldiers who served during the Argentine War of Independence.

== Biography ==
He was born on September 15, 1787, in Buenos Aires, and was baptized the next day in the Metropolitan Cathedral by the presbyter Juan Antonio Delgado as Josse Manuel Cornelio Ramón Jugluns de Canaverys, being his godmother Juana Fonelo, belonging to a family from Cádiz. He was the eighth son of Juan Canaveris and Bernarda Catalina de Esparza. His family consisted of six brothers and six women, born between 1773 and 1797. They lived in a house located in the neighborhood of San Nicolás.

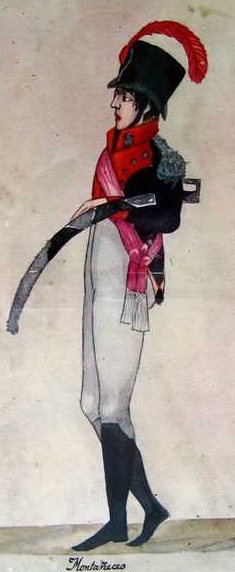
Officer of Cántabros regiment, according to a drawing of his time

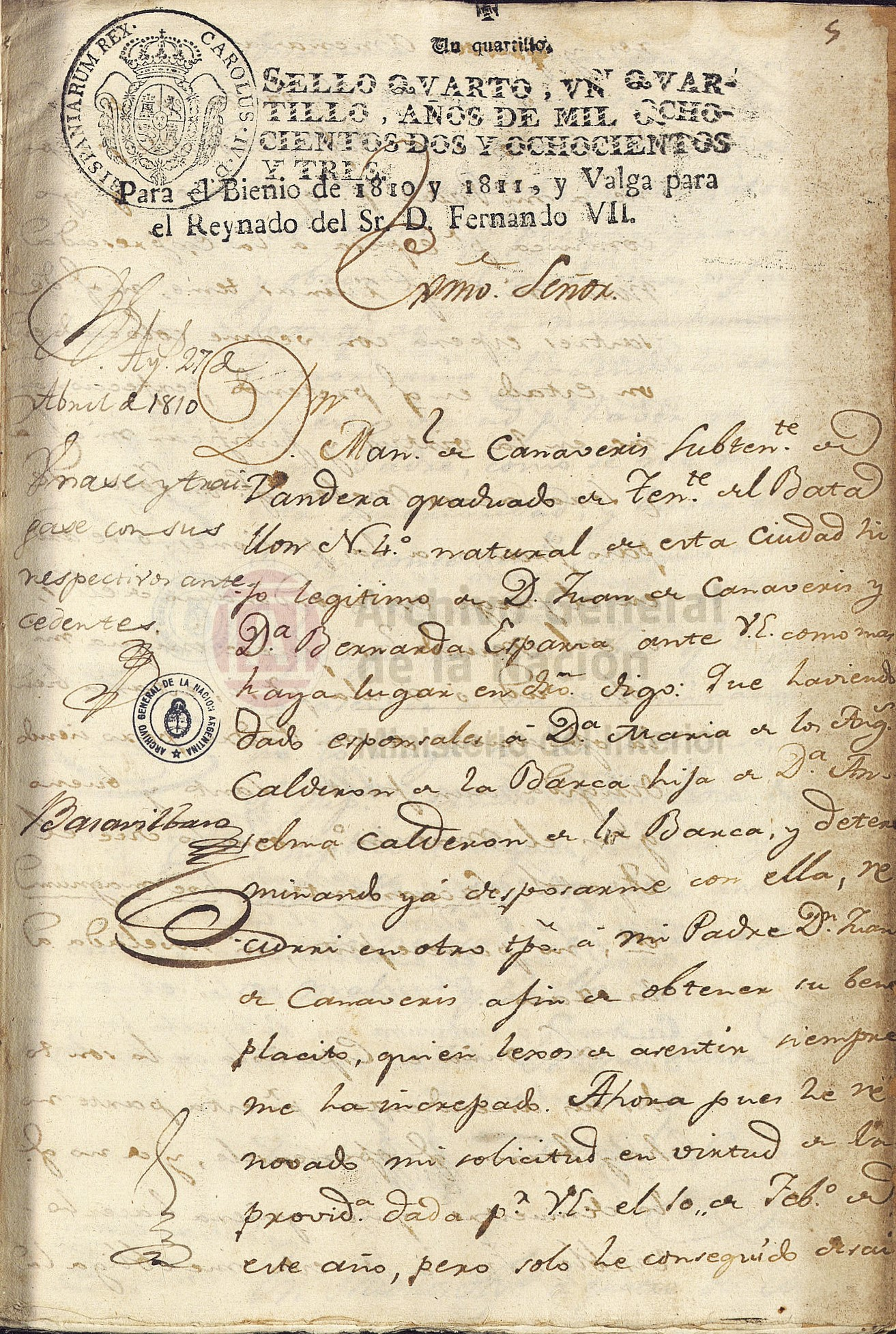
record referring to the allegation of Manuel Canaveris in the trial against his father

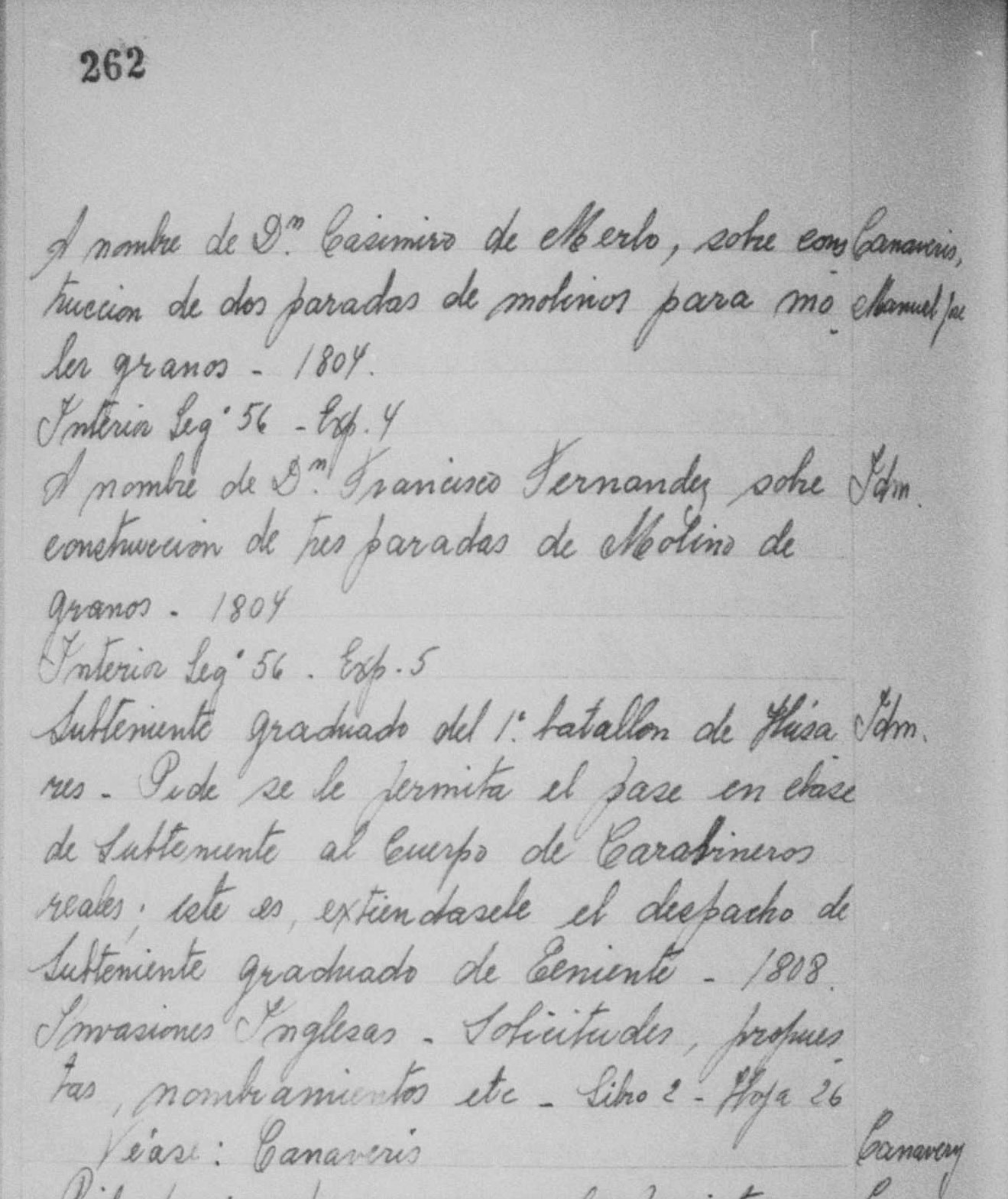
record on the actions of the Canaveris family during the English Invasions.

Manuel Canaveris probably did his studies in the Real Colegio de San Carlos, the main educational establishment of the city. Some time later he and his brothers began to work as accounting employees of the Court of Accounts of Buenos Aires, where his father performed administrative functions.

Like other members of his mother's family, Manuel served in the military. His mother's ancestors include Captains Miguel Gerónimo Esparza, Francisco de Salas Reynoso, Pedro Morales y Mercado and Gonzalo Carbajal, who served as General and Lieutenant Governor of Santa Fe.

Manuel Canaveris and his brothers Mariano, Joaquín and José were members of the volunteer militias, for defense of Buenos Aires during the British invasions of the Río de la Plata 1806–1807. In the second British invasion Manuel Canaveris, had served in Tercio de Cántabros Montañeses, Mariano Canaveris served in Húsares of Pueyrredón, José Canaveris in the Quinteros y Labradores, and Joaquín Canaveris in the Tercio de Vizcaínos, formed by volunteers of Basque origin.

The Tercio de Cántabros Montañeses, also known as Tercio of Montañeses, had been created on September 18, 1806, and counted as chiefs José de la Oyuela and Pedro Andrés García, belonging to illustrious families of the city. At the beginning of the English invasions the battalion had 4 companies, with 261 troops. During the second invasion the British commanders Robert Craufurd and Denis Pack, were defeated by Creole regiments of Montañeses and Patricios in the Convent of Santo Domingo.

His father participated in the secret meetings of the neighbors during the British domination of Buenos Aires, and also contributed money to cover the expenses of the Spanish militias of the city. His brother Jose Canaveris, a well-known city lawyer, was awarded with the degree of Captain, by the Junta Suprema of Seville for his heroic actions during the English invasions.

Unlike his brothers, who were lawyers and teachers, he devoted himself entirely to the military career. Between 1809 and 1810, Canaveris was Sub-lieutenant Abanderado in the 4th Regiment of Infantry, formed by members of the "Tercio de Cántabros Montañeses" and Tercio de Andaluces. The Cántabros regiment was one of the units held by Viceroy Liniers, who repressed the rebels during Mutiny of Álzaga. Canaveris served in the same regiment during the events of May 1810, and took part in the early years of the struggle for Independence in Argentina.

Manuel Canaveris was promoted to Lieutenant of the 4th Regiment by order of the Primera Junta, on August 3, 1810. He served under the orders of the Colonels José Merelo and Ignacio Álvarez Thomas, and took part in the donations to finance the First Upper Peru campaign in 1810.

As several members of the local aristocracy and bourgeoisie, he participated in the recruitment of slaves to enlist them in the revolutionary armies. In 1810 he rescued a freedman named Raimundo, probably to be enlisted in the Regimiento de Castas, a military unit of freedmen recruited in Buenos Aires.

In 1811 he obtains permission to marry his fiancée, Dona Maria de los Angeles Rodriguez Calderon de la Barca, after an extensive trial against his father.

He possibly took part in the Liberating Expeditions to the Banda Oriental, during the military campaigns of the 4° Regiment against the Spanish troops in Montevideo.

In 1812, Manuel Canaveris was commissioned to serve as 2nd lieutenant in the 7th Fusilier Company of 2nd Patrician Regiment, participating in the campaigns to the north under the command of Colonel Francisco Ortiz de Ocampo. Several regiments of Buenos Aires, including the riflemen of Patricians used the Brown Bess muskets, (known as "tower") which had been seized from the English invaders.

Manuel Canaveris was retired from the Army at the age of 24, on January 17, 1812. He had served for six years, including his four years of service as Commander in the 2° Batallón del Regimiento N° 4 de Infantería of Buenos Aires, and in the 7° Compañía de Fusileros del Regimiento N°2 de Patricios.

His family logistically supported the emancipation of the Argentine Republic. His brother Joaquín Canaveris participated in the donations for the regorganization of the Army of the North, and his brother José Canaveris, provided services in the Honorable Junta de Observacion, and the Comisaria General de Guerra of the United Provinces of the Rio de la Plata.

After the Argentine Declaration of Independence, Manuel Canaveris devoted himself entirely to commerce and agriculture. He owned a small ranch, probably located in Barracas or Balvanera. He died in 1824 or 1825, his wife is registered as a widow in the 1827 Census in Buenos Aires. His widow received financial help from his nephew Juan Manuel Canaveris, in charge of the maintenance of the minor children. All his sons received the corresponding part of the will from their grandmother Catalina Bernarda Esparza, which included the paternal houses of the Canaveris Esparza family, located in the San Nicolás neighborhood.

His wife was assisted (signature upon request) in the succession procedures of Mrs. Esparza by Hilario Amoedo (father of Sinforoso Amoedo), Rafael Canavery (uncle of Tomás Canavery), Marcos Rincón and José Halliburton Wright, the son of Jorge Halliburton. His sister María Antonia Canaveri was assisted in identical circumstances by his son Apolinario Linera and Juan Andrés Mayer, a former midshipman of the Royal Navy, married in Buenos Aires to Dolores Posadas, and father of Edelmiro and Federico Mayer.

== Family ==
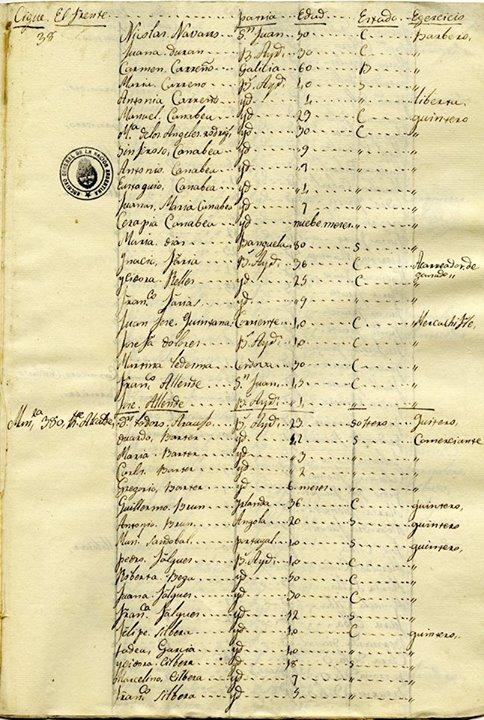
Padrón de extranjeros, Manuel Canabeu (Canaveris) & family (Monserrat)

Manuel Canaveris, married at parish church Nuestra Señora de Montserrat on April 24, 1811, with María de los Ángeles Rodríguez, daughter of Basilio Rodríguez Rubio and Anselma Calderón de la Barca. His wedding was officiated by Juan Nepomuceno Solá, a personal friend of the family. He and his wife were parents of Sinforoso, Antonino, María Juana, Eustaquio, Serapio, Rufino, Vicente and Ruperta Canaveris.

His mother-in-law María Anselma Calderón de la Barca, was the daughter of Joseph Antonio Calderón and Margarita Taborda, a family from San Isidro and Buenos Aires, linked in turn to Creole families of Carmen de Areco, Exaltación de la Cruz and Rosario, Santa Fe. She died in 1829 in Buenos Aires, being buried in the Cementerio del Norte.

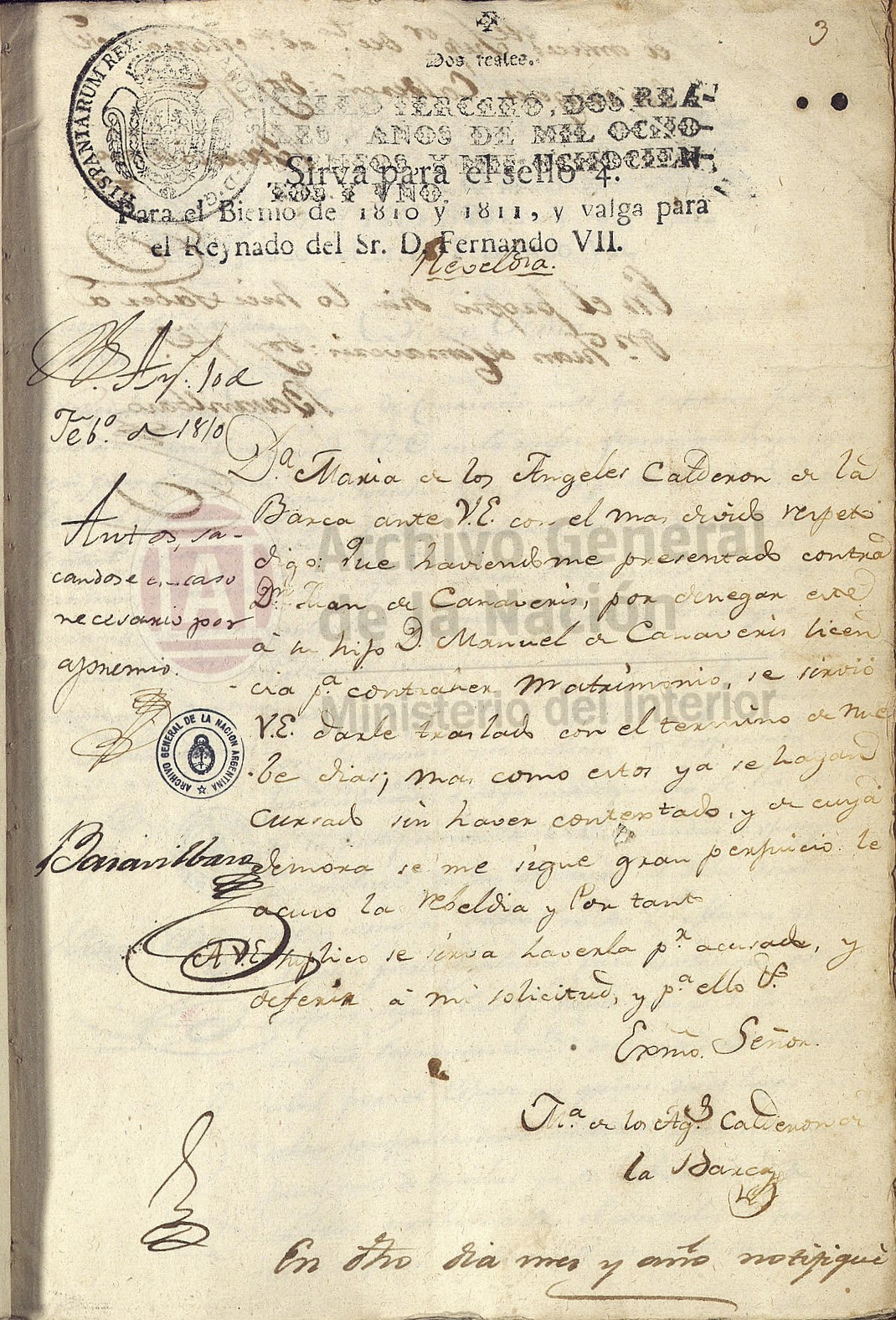
record referring to the trial of María de los Ángeles Rodríguez against Juan Canaveris

His wife's family was related to the family of Francisco Cuitiño, born in Mendoza, and Ramona Barbosa, in turn related to Jaime Darquier and Dolores Almagro, a distinguished woman, daughter of Juan María de Almagro y de la Torre and Ana Manuela de Arroyo y Pinedo, belonging to the main patrician families of Buenos Aires.

His sister-in-law Lucrecia Calderón de la Barca, was married in first nuptials with Tadeo Chavarría, belonging by maternal line to López Camelo families. His cousin-in-law, Mariano García Calderón served in the 2nd Compañía de Cazadores of the Regimiento Infantería de Patricios, taking an active part during the first Argentine Emancipatory stage.

It is not possible to establish reliably to which branch of the Calderón de la Barca belonged the wife of Manuel Canaveris, but possibly her grandfather was the same José Antonio Calderón de la Barca, born in Cádiz, who widower of Margarita Taborda, was married in the Parish of Inmaculada Concepción of Tigre to Juana Ponte de Lima. It is also possible that she was a descendant of Juan Calderón de la Barca, married in 1704 in Córdoba with Catalina de Cabrera, daughter of Pedro Luis de Cabrera y Saavedra and Teresa Carranza y Cabrera, belonging to families of Creole lineages.

Towards the beginning of 1810, his wife Doña María de los Ángeles Rodríguez y Calderón de la Barca took a legal action against the father of her fiancé Don Juan de Canaveris for denying her consent to marry him. This trial was carried out by the Notary Mayor of Government José Ramón Basavilbaso, and included among other witnesses Don Miguel de Azcuenaga.

Most of the children of Manuel Canaveris were linked to military families. His son, Sinforoso Canaveri Rodríguez served as lieutenant in the Batallón de Voluntarios Rebajados of Buenos Aires, under the command of Colonel Joaquín María Ramiro. His sixth child Rufino Canaveris, was married in the first nuptials with Cirila Borda, daughter of Vicente Borda, a Lieutenant who served in the Regimiento de Artillería Volante.

His son-in-law Juan Ángel Michelena, was an officer of the Argentine army, who reached the rank of lieutenant colonel in 1852. He took an active part in the Liberating Expedition of Peru, participating in the Battle of Torata and Battle of Moquegua, where he was taken prisoner.

Manuel Canaveris was also related to Francisco Pelliza, a patriot who served under Manuel Belgrano in the Army of the North.

In 1879, Colonel Tomás O'Gorman attended as godfather at the wedding of his great-granddaughter María Luisa Canaveri with Sergeant Major Damián Vera, a military man who participated in the War of the Triple Alliance.

Camilo Alejo Canavery, a great-grandson of Manuel Canaveris, was a lawyer who joined the rebel forces of the Civic Union during the Revolution of the Park. He served as attorney of José Camilo Crotto, governor of Buenos Aires Province between 1918 and 1921.

Like his ancestors, Manuel Canaveri 's family were fervent Christians. Most of his children and grandchildren were married or baptized in the Parish of Monserrat, including Guillermo Canavery, born on June 25, 1861, and baptized with that name in honor of Guillaume de Verceil. His great-grandson, Virginio Canaveris was baptized on November 8, 1867, in the Parroquia Nuestra Señora de la Piedad, being his godson Manuel Terry Marmol, belonging to the Terry family.

A few branches of their descendants were established or born in the neighborhoods of San Cristóbal, Vélez Sársfield, Nueva Chicago and Nueva Pompeya, but also in rural areas like Lincoln and Olavarría, place where a street with its surname is located. His last distinguished branches of his paternal lineage were the Canaveris Trillo, Canaveris Panelo, Canavery Flores, Canavery Andrade, Canavery de Alvarado Périchon and the marriage of his great-grandson Saturnino Canaveri with Carmen Canavery, daughter of Adolfo Canavery and Carmen Martinez.

Manuel Canaveris was registered in the Gazeta de Buenos Aires of August 16, 1810. His grandchildren and nephews are cited in the historical novel Amalia, written by José Mármol.
