= Francisco Pelliza =

Military officer (1792-1879)

Sargento Mayor Francisco Pelliza

Personal details
- Born: Francisco María de Paula Pelliza y Molina; 1792 Buenos Aires, Argentina
- Died: November 19, 1879 (aged 86–87) Buenos Aires, Argentina
- Resting place: La Recoleta Cemetery
- Party: Unitarian Party
- Spouse(s): María de los Santos Fernández; Francisca Burgos
- Children: José María Pelliza; Manuela Pelliza; Olegario Pelliza; Francisca Pelliza; Mariano Pelliza; Dominga Pelliza; Flora Pelliza; Emilia Pelliza
- Relatives: Saturnino Canaveri (great-grandson); Héctor Canaveri (great-grandson); Santiago Spencer Wilde (relative-in-law); Pedro Mom (brother-in-law)
- Occupation: army politician
- Profession: military man

Military service
- Allegiance: Spain — until 1810 (Argentina) United Provinces of the River Plate (1810-1831); State of Buenos Aires (1852-1861); Argentine Republic (1861-1879)
- Branch/service: Argentine Army
- Years of service: 1806-1822
- Rank: Sergeant major
- Commands: Regiment of Patricians; Army of the North
- Battles/wars: British invasions of the River Plate; May Revolution; Argentine War of Independence; Liberating Expedition of Peru; Argentine Civil War

Francisco Pelliza (1792–1879) was an Argentine patriot military officer who fought in the Argentine War of Independence. He took part in the defense and reconquest of Buenos Aires during the English Invasions and carried out the Emancipatory campaigns under the command of General Manuel Belgrano.

He was taken prisoner after the defeat of Ayohuma on November 14, 1813, and destined for the Casas Matas of Callao jail where he was held for several years. He owed his freedom to a prisoner exchange made by General José de San Martín in 1820. He was rejoined the army that same year serving with the rank of Captain in the Expedición Libertadora del Perú.

He also took part in the Argentine Civil War, serving in the ranks of the Unitarian Army participated in the Invasion of Lavalle to the Province of Buenos Aires.

== Biography ==
He was born in Buenos Aires, son of Luis Pelliza and María Molina, belonging to a distinguished Creole family. He did his elementary studies in the Colegio Real de San Carlos, and began his military career during the first British invasions of the River Plate, serving in the Regiment of Patricians.

He was graduated as Ensign of the Patrician Regiment on July 30, 1808, then serving as second lieutenant of the same regiment from January 10, 1809. That same year the Regiment of Patricians under the command of Cornelio Saavedra took part in the actions against the rebel troops of Martín de Álzaga, who had risen up against the Viceroy Liniers (Mutiny of Álzaga).

He supported the cause of the May Revolution, and was confirmed as officer of the Patricians by the new authorities. He took part in the first battles produced in the War for Independence since 1810.

In 1812 Francisco Pelliza served as Lieutenant in the Army of the North commanded by Manuel Belgrano. Under the command of General Belgrano, he participated in the battles Tucuman, Salta, Vilcapugio and Ayohuma. On 14, November 1813, Pelliza was taken prisoner at the Battle of Ayohuma. He was imprisoned until 1820, when he was released in a prisoner exchange by General José de San Martin. In 1821, Pelliza was promoted to Captain, serving in the Escolta de Húsares.

Francisco Pelliza retired from the Army with the rank of Sergeant major. In 1831, he was appointed to occupy the post of Chief of Campaña (Alcalde) in the town of Cañuelas (Buenos Aires Province). He and his family were active members of Freemasonry in the Río de La Plata.

== Family ==
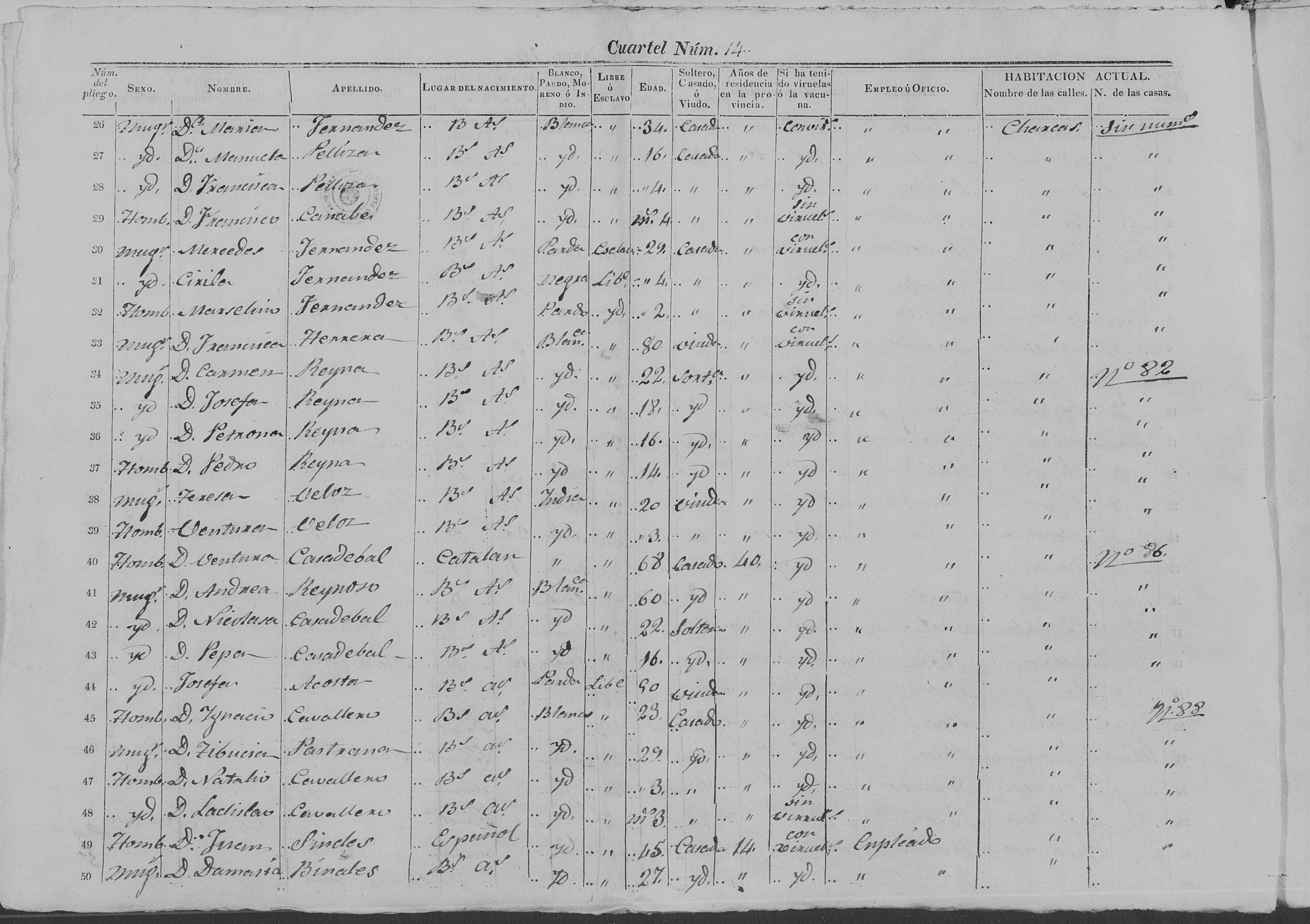
his wife, daughter and grandson registered in the 1827 Census

He married on September 12, 1812 in the Buenos Aires Cathedral, to María de los Santos Fernández Castro, daughter of Ramón de los Santos Fernández and Encarnación Molina. He and his wife were parents of Manuela Pelliza (born in 1812), married on August 17, 1826 in Santos Lugares to Sinforoso Camilo Canaveris, son of María de los Ángeles Rodríguez and Manuel Canaveris, a lieutenant who served in the Regiment of Patricians. His grandson Francisco María Canaveris (1827-1861) was a cavalry lieutenant who took part in the war between the Argentine Confederation and the State of Buenos Aires. He took an active part serving in the defense of Buenos Aires against the besieging troops of General Hilario Lagos.

Francisco Pelliza was the great-grandson of Domingo Pelliza, a Genoese merchant established in Buenos Aires by 1738. He was also a descendant of Domingo de Acassuso, founder of San Isidro, a city in the Buenos Aires Province.

His son Mariano Aurelio Pelliza, was married to his cousin Virginia Pelliza Pueyrredón, daughter of José María Pelliza and Virginia Pueyrredón, in turn daughter of Juan Martín de Pueyrredón and Juana Sánchez. His family is also directly linked to the families Wilde and Mom.
