= Saturnino Canaveri =

Argentine military man and politician

Teniente Coronel Saturnino Canaveri

Personal details
- Born: Saturnino Mariano Canaveri y Segrestán; June 5, 1855 Buenos Aires
- Died: 1939 (aged 83–84) Buenos Aires
- Resting place: La Chacarita Cemetery
- Party: National Autonomist Party
- Spouse: Carmen Canavery Martínez
- Children: Aurora Canaveri; Ana María Canaveri; María Esther Canaveri
- Relatives: Manuel Canaveri (great grandfather); Héctor Canaveri (brother); Horacio Sautú Canaveri (cousin); Baldomero Lamela Luengo (relative-in-law)
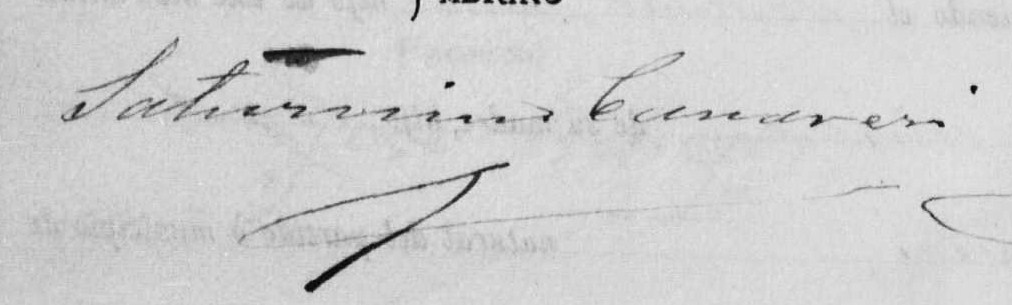
- Signature

Military service
- Allegiance: Argentine Republic
- Branch/service: Argentine Army
- Years of service: 1867–1900
- Rank: Lieutenant colonel
- Unit: Regimiento 2° de Caballería de Línea
- Battles/wars: Battle of the Sierra Currumalán; Campaign from the Andes to the South of Patagonia; Battle of the Plaza Libertad

Saturnino Canaveri (1855 – 1939) was an Argentine military man and politician, who served as officer of the 2nd Cavalry Regiment. He took part in the main military actions that occurred during the Conquest of the Desert, including the actions prior to the Battle of Aluminé, against the Chilean Army.

He took active part in several clashes between the Argentine army and the Pampas tribes, highlighting his actions in the Combat of the Sierra de Currumalán (Coronel Suárez). His services also include his participation in the confrontations between the National Government troops and the Revolutionaries of the Civic Union, event occurred during the Revolution of the Park.

== Career ==
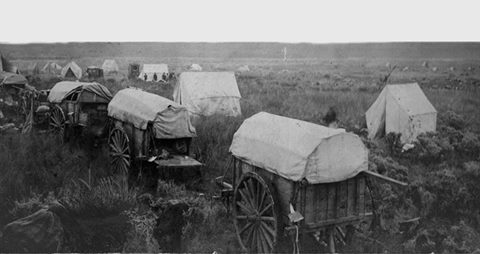
The 2nd division of the army crossing La Pampa c.1879

He was born in Buenos Aires, the son of Francisco Canaveri and Ofelia Segrestán, belonging to a distinguished family of Irish and French descent. He completed his elementary studies in the city, and began his military career after the death of his father. He was enlisted in the 2° Regimiento de Caballería de Línea towards the year of 1875, serving as alférez in Guaminí, province of Buenos Aires.

He served in the campaigns organized by the then President Nicolás Avellaneda, tending to prevent indigenous incursions into the province of Buenos Aires. He also took part in the main actions produced during the General Julio Argentino Roca Campaign in southern Argentina.

He was commissioned to pursue the main chieftains, including Ancapi Ñancucheo, a brave Pehuenche chief, who had his huts on the Chimehuin River. He also participated in the persecution of Antener (brave chief of Boroano origin), and led an expedition of forty soldiers, in the Chimehuin River. The expedition counted on two baqueanos who officiated as guides.

After completing his military services as an expeditionary to the Desert, he arrived in the Port of Buenos Aires on May 9, 1883, aboard the Villarino Steam from Patagonia. He had served in the detachment the General Roca about five years, and began to provide services in Buenos Aires since June 1883.

His military missions also include the actions prior to Battle of Aluminé, occurred on February 18, 1883, during tasks of exploration and topographical recognition, commanding by General Conrado Villegas in the Río Negro and Neuquén.

Saturnino Canaveri was also involved in civil conflicts of the Argentina. During the Revolution of the Park remained loyal to the government, participating actively in the operations commanded by the General Nicolás Levalle against the revolutionaries.

In 1892 Canaveri was promoted to lieutenant colonel, becoming part of the reserve forces of the Argentine army in 1896. He also performed administrative tasks in the Estado Mayor General del Ejército, and served for some years in the Córdoba Brigade, under the command of General Ignacio Fotheringham.

In his long military career, Canaveri was awarded several medals for his participation in the military campaigns of Río Negro, Chaco Province, Junín de los Andes, Buenos Aires Province and San Luis.

Saturnino Canaveri was retired on January 5, 1900, after thirty-three years of active service. Some time after his retirement he served as an inspector of shooting in the Escuela Normal de Tiro of Buenos Aires. He died in 1939 at the age of 84.

== Family ==
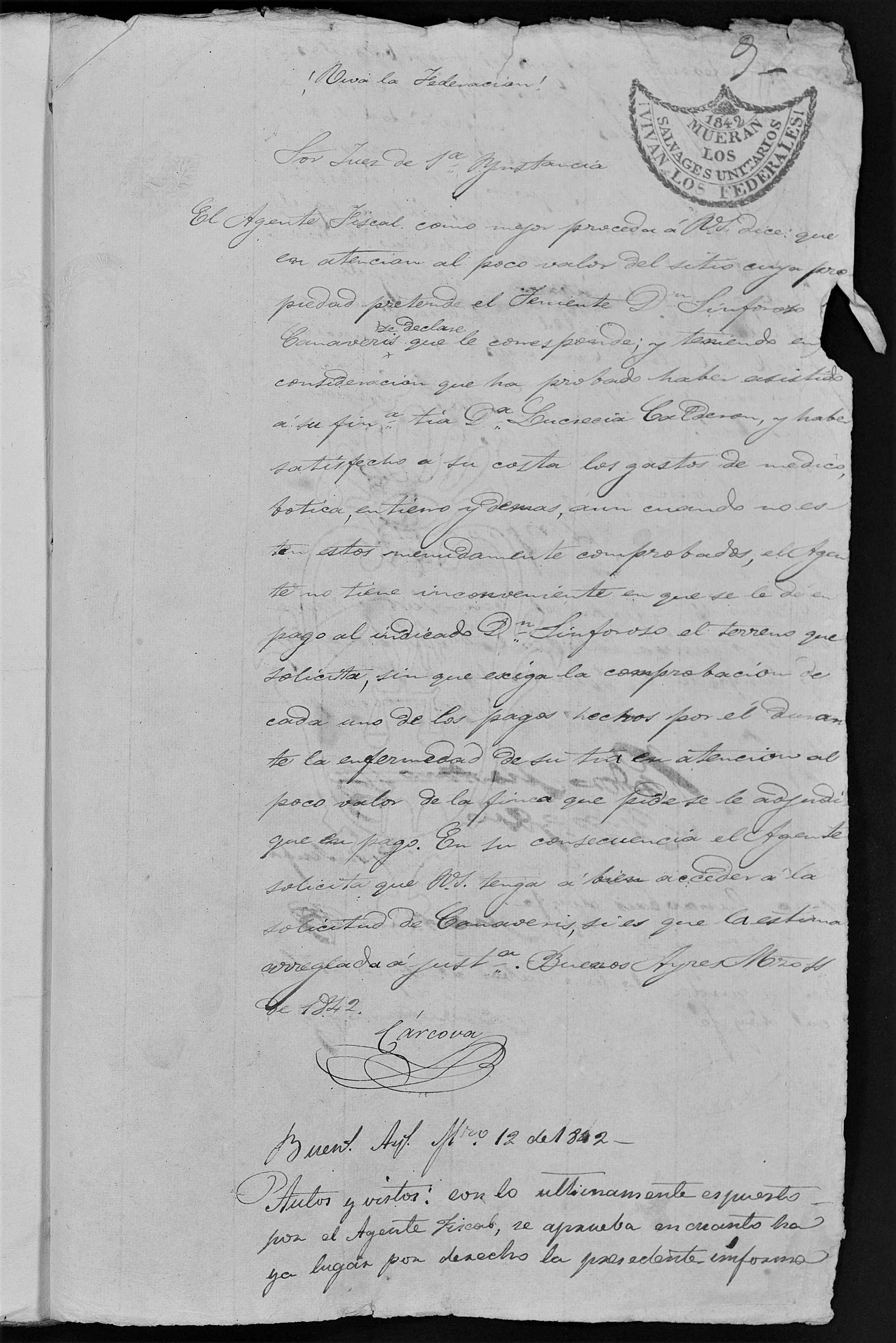
record concerning his grandfather Lt. Sinforoso Canaveri

Saturnino Canaveri was married in the Parroquia de la Inmaculada Concepción to her cousin Carmen Canavery, daughter of Adolfo Canavery and Carmen Martínez, belonging to an old family of Carmen de Areco. He belonged to distinguished families whose ancestors and relatives had served in the Army during the colonial and post colonial period of Argentina. His father Francisco Canaveris is cited with Alejandro Danel in Ensayo histórico de la defensa de Buenos Aires: contra la rebelion del ex-coronel D. Hilario Lagos, a historical book about the Argentine civil wars.

His grandfather Sinforoso Canaveri, served as 1st Lieutenant of Artillery in the Batallón de Voluntarios Rebajados de Buenos Aires, a military unit of Juan Manuel de Rosas, formed with former members of the Brazilian War and Desert Campaigns of 1830. His cousin Ángel Canaveri, served in the 1st Infantry Regiment under the command of General Julio Argentino Roca.

Saturnino Canaveri was a descendant of Domingo Brignole Pelliza, born by 1700 in Genoa, who served as Mayordomo in the Cabildo de Buenos Aires. His maternal paternal great-grandfather had been the sergeant major Francisco Pelliza, an honorable member of the Argentine army, who participated in the wars for independence.

Through the Pelliza family his genealogy is linked to the Pueyrredón-Dogan and Wilde's family. His family was also related to the familie of Juan Gregorio Lemos, a patriot who served under General José de San Martin.
