= Tercio de Cántabros Montañeses =

- Batallón de Voluntarios Urbanos Cántabros Montañeses
- Disbanded: 1811
- Country: Argentina
- Allegiance: Spain - until 1810 (Argentina) United Provinces of the River Plate
- Branch: Argentine Army
- Type: Infantry
- Patron: Santísima Trinidad
- Engagements: British invasions of the River Plate; Mutiny of Álzaga; May Revolution; Argentine War of Independence

Tercio de Cántabros Montañeses was a unit of infantry militias of the city of Buenos Aires of active participation during the English invasions to the Río de la Plata.

== History ==
The Batallón de Voluntarios Urbanos Cántabros Montañeses was created by decree of Santiago de Liniers, after the first British invasion to the city of Buenos Aires. It was composed in its majority by Criollos and Spaniards natives of the Cantabria. His Commanders were José de la Oyuela, born Santander, and Pedro Andrés García, born in Caranceja.

At first the Battalion of Cantabros Montañeses counted with four companies of fifty men. This military unit had a decisive participation during the second of the British Invasions, achieving the surrender of the Commanders Robert Craufurd and Denis Pack in the Santo Domingo Convent.

In 1809, the members of the Cantabros Battalion were distinguished by the Junta Suprema de Sevilla, for their heroic participation in the defense of Buenos Aires.

During the Mutiny of Álzaga, the Cántabros Montañeses were among the support troops of Viceroy Liniers.

== Regimiento N° 4 de Infantería ==
The Tercio de Cántabros Montañeses supported the Argentinian emancipatory cause. After the May Revolution, was renamed as the Regimiento N° 4 de Infantería of Buenos Aires (4th infantry regiment). Two companies of the Regimiento N° 4 had participated in the First Upper Peru campaign.

This regiment was formed on the basis of the Cántabros Battalion and the Tercio de Andaluces. Among his distinguished officers were the Colonels Don José Merelo and Don Ignacio Álvarez Thomas, and the lieutenants Manuel Canaveris and Ángel Galup.

== Gallery ==
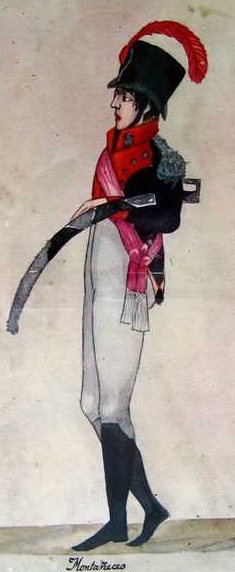
Officer's uniform of the Cántabros Montañeses

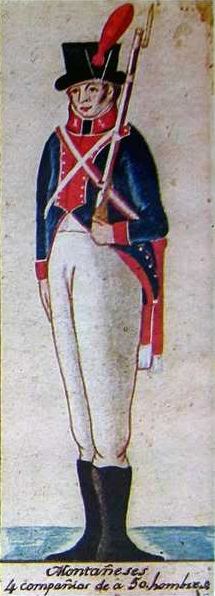
Uniform of soldier of the Cántabros Montañeses

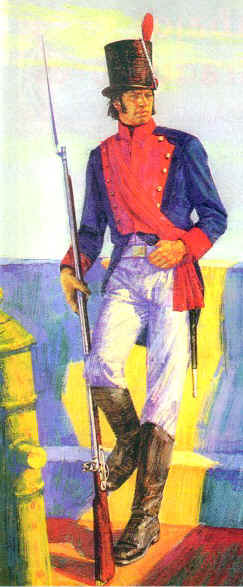
Modern illustration of the Uniform of the Cántabros Montañeses

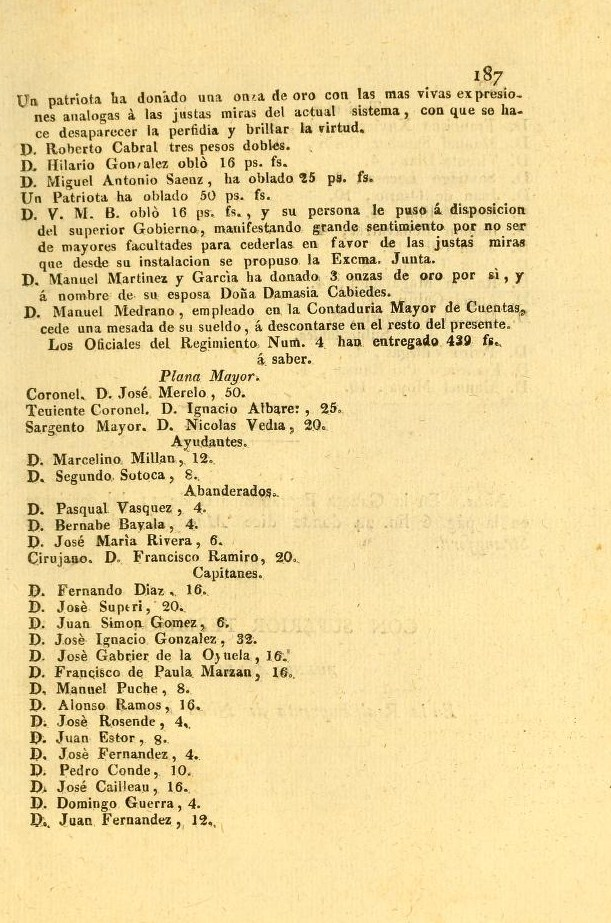
donations of the 4th Regiment, Gazeta de Buenos Ayres

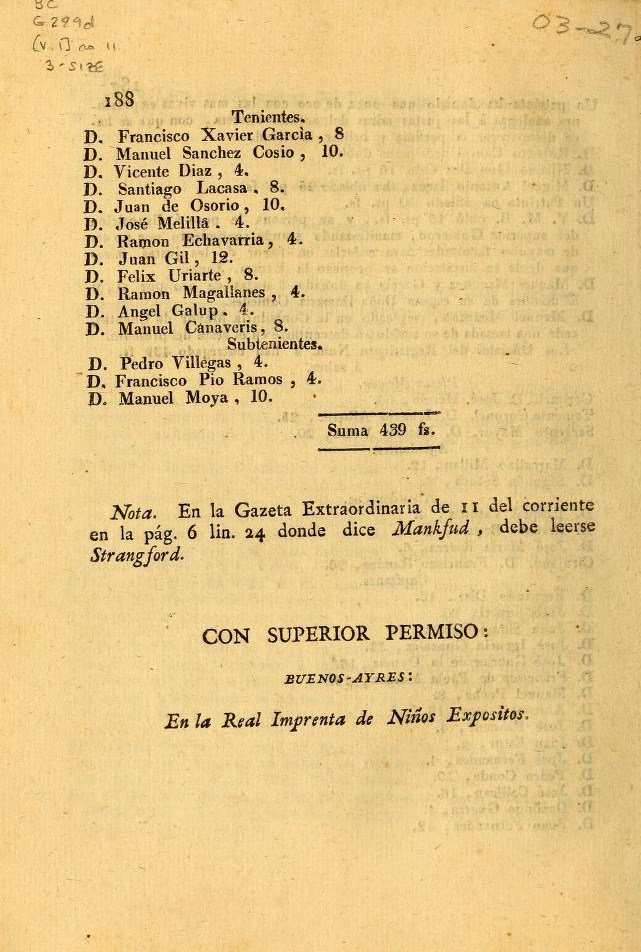
donations of the 4th Regiment, Gazeta de Buenos Ayres
