= Héctor Canavery =

Argentine politician and military man

Comisario Héctor Canavery Segrestán

Legislator by Buenos Aires Province
- In office 1892–1893
- President: Luis Sáenz Peña

Comisario de Ordenes of La Plata
- In office 1893–1893
- Governor: Lucio Vicente López
- Preceded by: ?
- Succeeded by: ?

Personal details
- Born: March 22, 1854 Buenos Aires
- Died: 1929 (aged 74–75) Buenos Aires
- Resting place: La Chacarita cemetery
- Party: National Autonomist Party
- Spouse: Clara Flores Sastre
- Children: Héctor Raul Canavery; Enrique Guillermo Canavery; Mario César Canavery; Lila Canavery; Julio Canavery; María Esther Canavery (wife of Ricardo Clark)
- Relatives: Sinforoso Canaveris (grandfather); Juan Clark (relative-in-law); Mariano Aurelio Pelliza (great uncle); José Antonio Wilde (cousin)
- Occupation: army politician police militia clerk
- Profession: Army's officer police
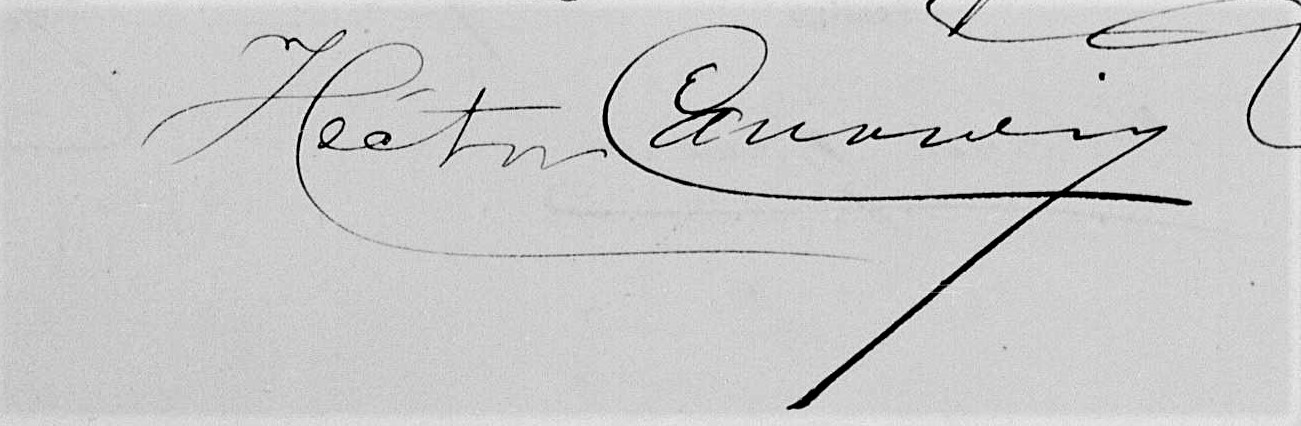
- Signature

Military service
- Allegiance: Argentine Republic
- Branch/service: Argentine Army
- Years of service: 1873-1890
- Rank: Lieutenant
- Unit: 2° Regimiento de Caballería de Línea
- Commands: 1° Regimiento de Caballería of the Guardia Nacional
- Battles/wars: Conquest of the Desert; Revolution of the Park

Héctor Canavery (March 22, 1854 – 1929) was an Argentine politician and military man, who took part in the military campaigns in the territory of Patagonia. He also dabbled in politics, serving as a legislator for the National Autonomist Party.

He took part in the beginning of the Argentine police, serving for many years as a comisario in the town of Quilmes, he also served as sub-chief of the Police of the Province of Buenos Aires in 1893. He also had an active participation during the events that occurred during the Revolution of 1890, serving in the forces of support to the national government.

== Biography ==
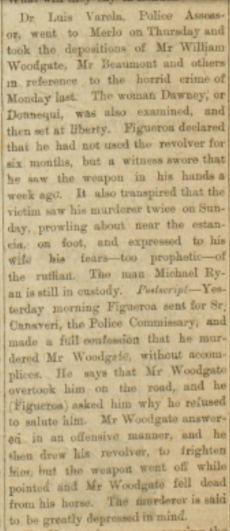
news of The Standard and River Plate News on March 17, 1883.

He was born in Barracas, Buenos Aires, the son Francisco Canavery, a Lieutenant of Cavalry, and Orfelia Segrestán, belonging to a family of French ancestry. He completed his primary and secondary studies in the city, and enlisted in the National Army for the year of 1873.

He took part in military expeditions in Patagonia, including the Campaign to the Río Negro of 1875. His appointment as lieutenant of the 2° Regimiento de Caballería de Línea was by signature of then-President Nicolás Avellaneda and his Minister of War Adolfo Alsina.

During the 19th century it was common for army personnel to perform police functions. Canavery served as officer of the Police of the Province of Buenos Aires for several years. In 1883 he was commissioned to clarify the murder of a citizen of British origin, which occurred in the town of Merlo. This news was published in the newspaper The Standard and River Plate News of March 17 of that year.

Towards the mid 1880s he was appointed to the position of Chief of police in the town of Quilmes, and later it was designated to occupy the Commissariat of orders of the City of La Plata.

The position of "Comisario de Ordenes" was equivalent to that of Sub-Chief of Police of Buenos Aires Province, and was used by the Police Headquarters until the beginning of the 20th century.

His beginnings in the police force had been as a clerk in the Central Police Department of Buenos Aires, a position he resigned on August 31, 1882.

Canavery was head of the 1° Regimiento de Caballería of the Guardia Nacional, taking part in the main military actions produced during the Park Revolution. He also dedicated himself to politics, militating in the Partido Autonomista Nacional, and holding the position of legislator of Buenos Aires province in 1892. He was elected deputy along with notorious politicians of the time as Benito Lynch.

In 1896 Canavery was appointed to integrate the reserve forces of the Argentine Republic. He performed administrative tasks in the Arsenal Principal de Guerra towards the beginning of the 20th century.

He served in the Argentine Army for sixteen years and nine months, obtaining his retirement with the position of Lieutenant in 1900. He was granted his retirement with the enjoyment of fifty-two percent of his salary by decree signed by Julio Argentino Roca.

Héctor Canavery also was recognized by the National Government for his services rendered during the military campaigns in the margins of Río Negro and Neuquén. He died on June 1, 1929, in Buenos Aires.

== Family ==
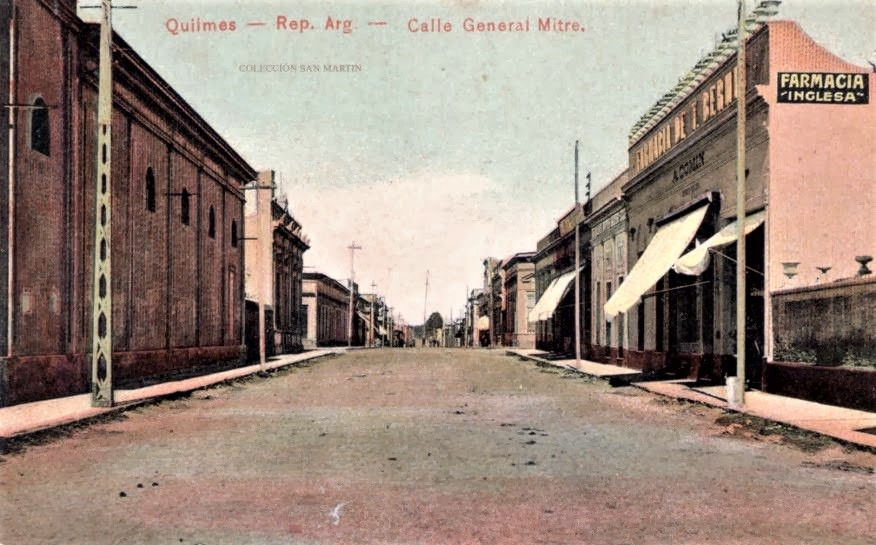
The town of Quilmes, c.1900

Héctor Canavery was married on June 15, 1885, in the Parish of Inmaculada Concepción of Quilmes to Clara Flores, daughter of Vladislao Flores and Pastora Sastre, belonging to a Creole family of Spanish roots. He and his wife were the parents of several children, including Enrique Guillermo, godson of Enrique S. Quintana, and Julio Gustavo, sponsored at his baptism by Florencio Monteagudo and Dolores Tejedor.

His father, Francisco María Canavery, a lieutenant of the cavalry of the State of Buenos Aires, participated in the Revolution of 11 September 1852 and in the defense of Buenos Aires during the siege of Colonel Hilario Lagos. His brother Saturnino Canavery and his cousin Ángel Canavery, were his comrades in the Desert Expeditions. Several of his ancestors and relatives were linked to distinguished patriots of the War of Independence, among them Francisco Pelliza, and Juan Gregorio Lemos.

The Canavery family was rooted in the town of Quilmes since the colonial period. They were neighbors of distinguished members of the British community in the area, including the family of Eduardo Clark and Julio César Sanders.

His great grandfather, Juan Canaverys, a lawyer of Western and Central Europe ancestors, belonged to families from southern France and northwest Italy. He settled in the neighborhood of San Nicolás since his arrival in Río de la Plata in 1771.

Some of his relatives settled in the southern part of Greater Buenos Aires, including Temperley and Adrogué. His son Héctor Raúl Canavery Flores had owned a fine poultry farm, located in the town of Banfield. He appeared at the exhibitions of the Sociedad Rural Argentina, being the winner of several awards granted by that institution.

Mario César Canavery Flores, was married to his relative, María Petrona Amoedo Vilaró, daughter of Hilario Amoedo Dupuy (son Felipe Amoedo) and Amalia Florencia Vilaró Quirno.
