= Manuela Pedraza =

Argentine military person (1780–1850)

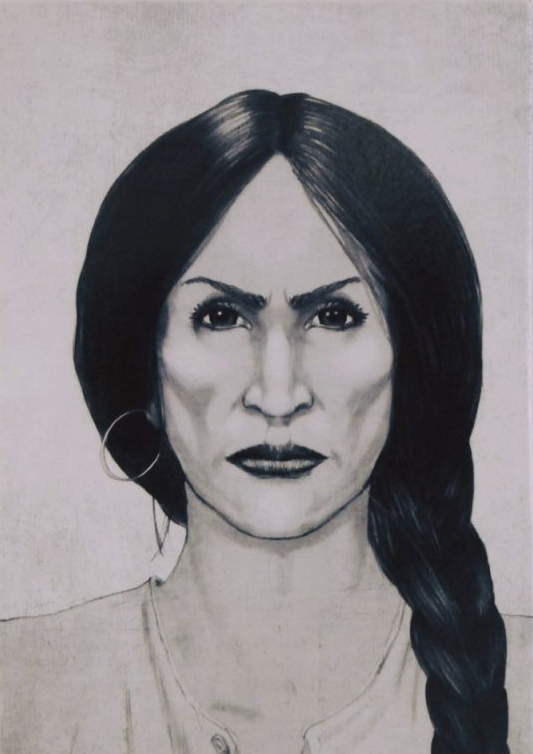
- Born: Manuela Hurtado y Pedraza c. 1780; Tucumán, Viceroyalty of the Río de la Plata
- Died: March 17, 1850 (aged 69–70); Buenos Aires, United Provinces of the Río de la Plata
- Other name: Manuela "La Tucumanesa"
- Occupations: Patriot; alférez
- Known for: Leading role in the British invasions resistance

Manuela Hurtado y Pedraza was a woman who fought in the reconquest of Buenos Aires after the first British invasion of 1806. Her participation was considered heroic during the last battle, and her role was recognized by the Commander of the Buenos Aires forces, Santiago de Liniers.

Her full name was "Manuela Hurtado y Pedraza", but she was known to all as "Manuela la tucumanesa" (old style demonym for "Manuela from Tucumán", then part of the Viceroyalty of the Río de la Plata, now Argentina). Even though her origin is known, the precise location, as well as her date of birth and death, are unknown.

Manuela Pedraza participated in the largest, and last, battle of the reconquest; it took place over three days (August 10–12, 1806) at the very centre of Buenos Aires. She fought alongside her husband (a corporal in the army) with the Liniers forces that surrounded the Spanish Fortress (now, the Casa Rosada, seat of the Argentine government on Plaza de Mayo), at that moment in British hands. On the second day of the battle, August 11, her husband was killed by a British soldier; in turn, Manuela killed that soldier with her own bayonet. Immediately after, she took her husband's musket and continued the fighting, killing another British soldier.

After the battle, Liniers, the commander of the victorious local forces and soon to be appointed Viceroy for the Río de la Plata, named Manuela to the newly formed Patricios Regiment with a salary and the rank of "alférez" (approximately, second lieutenant). The report by Liniers is displayed in the Museum of the Buenos Aires Cabildo, and reads:

"No debe omitirse el nombre de la mujer de un cabo de Asamblea, llamada Manuela la Tucumanesa, que combatiendo al lado de su marido con sublime entereza mató un inglés del que me presentó el fusil."

Translation:"It should not be omitted the name of the wife of a levied corporal, known as Manuela la Tucumanesa, who, while fighting alongside her husband with sublime courage, killed an Englishman and presented his captured musket to me."

== Homage ==
There is a street and a school in Buenos Aires named after her. In addition, the Government of the City of Buenos Aires gives the award "Mención de Honor Manuela Pedraza" in recognition to women involved in social activism in Argentina. In the citation for the recognition, it is stated: "This award seeks to reclaim a tradition of participation in the battles for liberty and the defense of the interests of the nation and its people, a tradition in which many countrymen gave their lives."
