= Parroquia de San Nicolás de Bari (Buenos Aires) =

Catholic church in Buenos Aires, Argentina

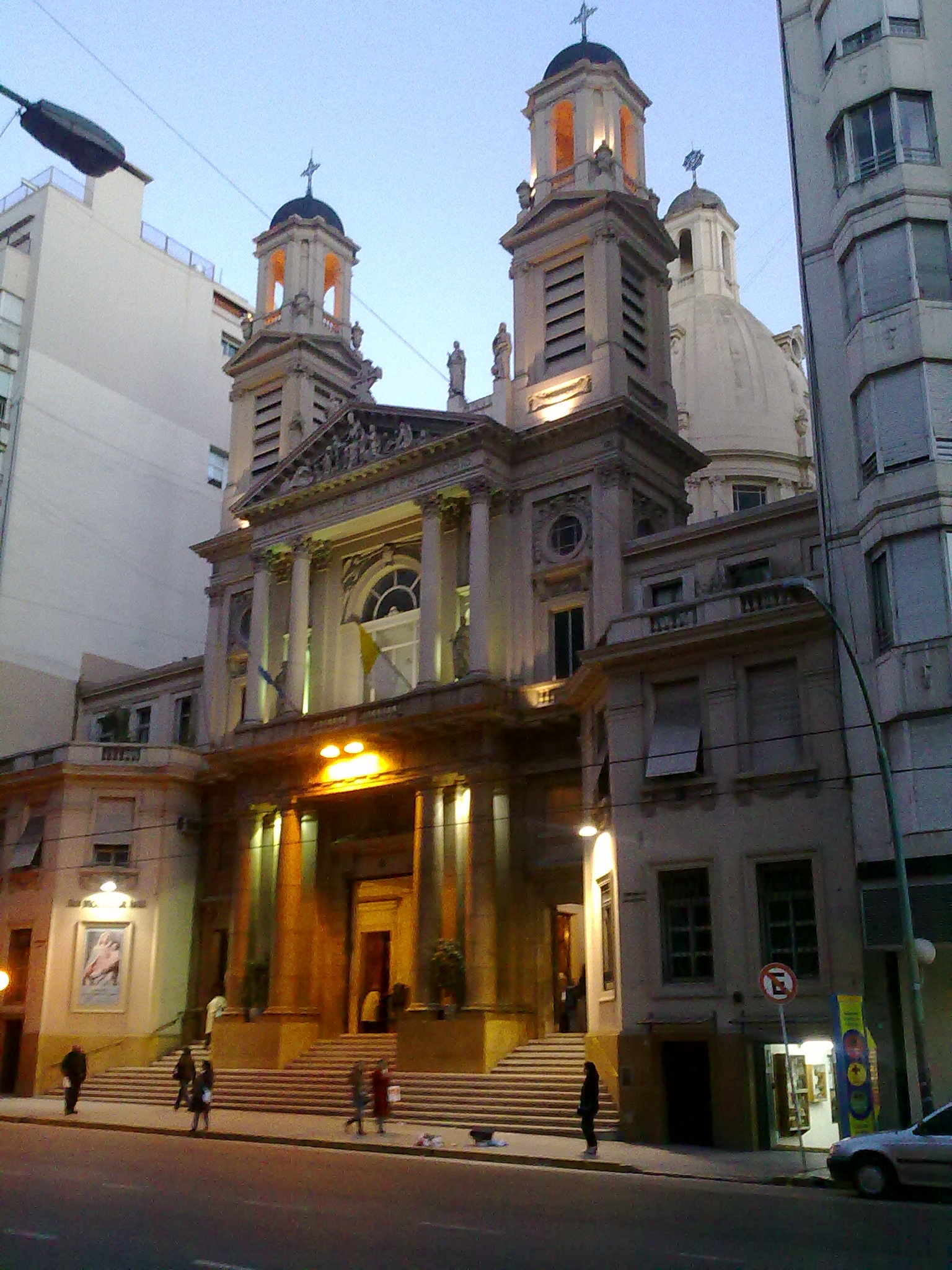
- view of the current facade

Religion
- Affiliation: Roman Catholic
- Rite: Catholic
- Patron: Saint Nicholas

Location
- Location: Santa Fe 1352, Buenos Aires
- Country: Argentina
- Interactive map of Parroquia de San Nicolás de Bari
- Coordinates: 34.59597°S 58.38653°W

Architecture
- Architects: Arturo Prins (1901); Carlos Messa (1935)
- Type: Baroque Revival
- Founder: Domingo de Acassuso; Francisco Araujo
- Established: 1733
- Completed: 1935

Parroquia de San Nicolás de Bari is a Catholic church located on Santa Fe Avenue, Retiro neighborhood, Buenos Aires, Argentina.

== History ==
The Parish of San Nicolás de Bari was established in 1733 by Domingo de Acassuso, founder of San Isidro. It was rebuilt in 1767. Its first priest was Joaquín Sotelo, who was the head of the parish for several years. Some of the priests came from ancient patrician families of Buenos Aires such as Manuel Alberti, member of the Primera Junta, and Eduardo O'Gorman, belonging to the families O'Gorman and Périchon de Vandeuil.

The parish has undergone reconstruction several times, among them the reconstruction by architect Arturo Prins in 1901, work that was demolished in 1931 due to the construction of the 9 de Julio Avenue. The current façade was completed in 1935 by the architect Carlos Messa. It was consecrated in 1935 and named a minor Basilica in 1937.
