= Tercio de Andaluces =

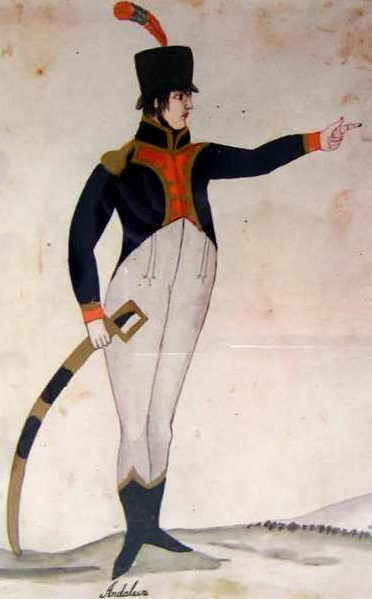
- 19th century illustration about the Officer's Uniform of the Tercio de Andaluces
- Disbanded: 1811
- Country: Argentina
- Allegiance: Spain - until 1810 (Argentina) United Provinces of the River Plate
- Branch: Argentine Army
- Type: Infantry
- Engagements: British invasions of the River Plate; Mutiny of Álzaga; May Revolution; Argentine War of Independence

The Tercio de Andaluces, also known as Batallón de Voluntarios Urbanos de los Cuatro Reinos de Andalucía, was a unit of Spanish militias of the city of Buenos Aires of the 19th century.

== History ==
The Tercio de Andaluces was created on October 8, 1806, after the first English Invasion of Buenos Aires. The battalion was composed of militiamen from Andalusia, and its Plana Mayor was integrated by the Commanders José Merelo, Agustín de Orta and Damián de Castro.

The Andalusian Battalion counted eight companies of fifty-five men, toking part in the military actions against the English troops in the second of the invasions. In 1809, the officers of this Battalion were part of the troops that sustained the Viceroy Liniers against the conspiracy of Martín de Alzaga.

After the May Revolution, by decree of the Primera Junta, the Batallón de Voluntarios Urbanos de los Cuatro Reinos de Andalucía was merged with the Regimiento N° 5 de Infantería. Two companies of this regiment were sent to the First Upper Peru campaign, taking part in the Battle of Cotagaita.
