= Domingo de Acassuso =

Spanish politician and military man

Capitán Domingo de Acassuso y de los Terreros
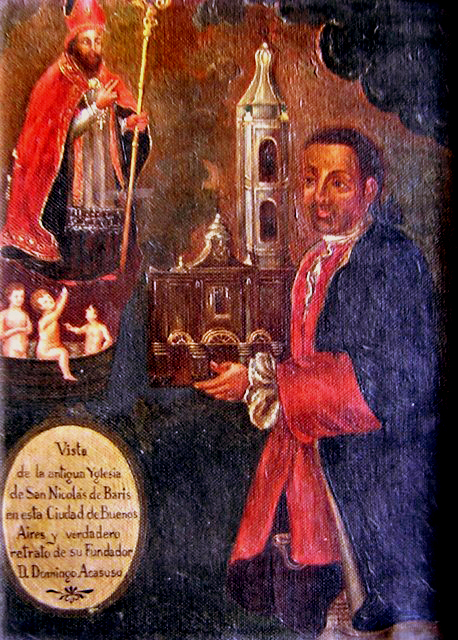
- portrait of Domingo de Acassuso

Alcalde of 2nd vote of Buenos Aires
- In office 1716–1717
- Monarch: Philip V of Spain
- Preceded by: Antonio de Igarzábal y Goitia
- Succeeded by: Mathías Solana

Personal details
- Born: 1658 Biscay, Spain
- Died: 1727 (aged 68–69) Buenos Aires, Argentina
- Resting place: Parish of San Nicolás de Bari
- Occupation: politician merchant
- Profession: Army's officer
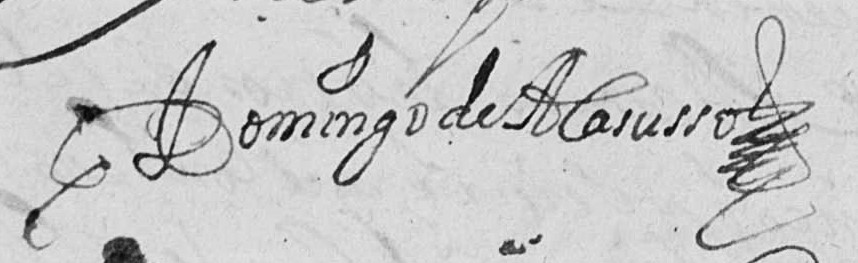
- Signature

Military service
- Allegiance: Spain
- Branch/service: Spanish Army
- Years of service: 1680-c.1720
- Rank: Captain
- Unit: regiments of Seville and Río de la Plata

Domingo de Acassuso (1658–1727) was a Spanish politician and military man, who served as mayor of Buenos Aires in 1716. He was the founder of the city of San Isidro in Buenos Aires Province.

== Biography ==
He was born in Zalla, province of Biscay, the son of Domingo de Acassuso and María de los Terreros. He was married to Teresa de Pessoa, daughter of Alejo de Pessoa y Figueroa, a descendant of families Gonçalves-Nuñez Cabral de Melo, and Juana Gómes, a mulatto woman, from whose union with the Pessoa family, descend a large number of patrician families of Buenos Aires.

Established in Buenos Aires fulfilled various political and military roles, including treasurer and accountant, and the vice-mayor of the city. His most important work was related to the construction of the Church of San Nicolás de Bari. He also was involved in the slave trade of Buenos Aires with the French and English factories. His house was located in the vicinity of the Real Asiento de Inglaterra, a factory belonging to South Sea Company.

The Club Atlético Acassuso was founded in honor of Domingo de Acassuso. His family was linked to the family of Domingo Pelliza, a politician and military man, born in La Spezia region of Liguria, Italy.
