= Enrique S. Quintana =

Doctor Enrique Santos Quintana
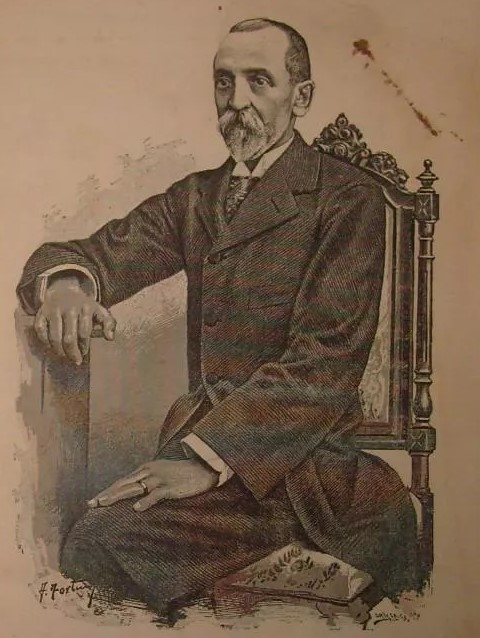

Minister of Justice and Public Instruction of Argentina
- In office 1893–1893
- Preceded by: Francisco Lucio García
- Succeeded by: Eduardo Costa

Minister of Government of Buenos Aires Province
- In office 1895–1896
- Preceded by: ?
- Succeeded by: ?

Deputy of the Argentine Republic
- In office 1895–1896

Senator of Buenos Aires Province
- In office 1891–1893

Personal details
- Born: March 27, 1851 Buenos Aires, Argentina
- Died: May 11, 1896 (aged 45) Buenos Aires, Argentina
- Resting place: La Recoleta Cemetery
- Party: Radical Civic Union
- Spouse: Clementina Mendez
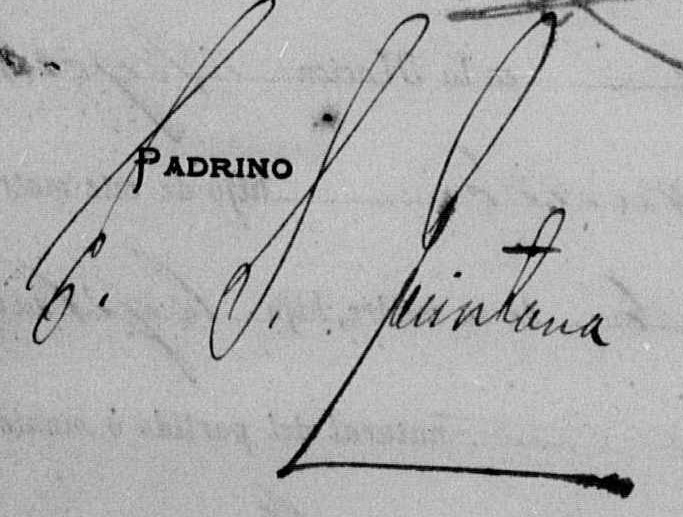
- Signature

Enrique Santos Quintana (1851-1896) was an Argentine jurist and politician, who served as Minister of Justice and Public Instruction of the Argentine Republic.

== Biography ==
He was born in Buenos Aires, the son of Pociano Quintana and María Rito Berro, belonging to a distinguished Creole family. He was married to Clementina Mendez, daughter of Mariano Méndez and Marta Palau.

He did his elementary studies in the National College, and he received a Law Degree in the University of Buenos Aires. He held various political positions, including deputy and senator. In 1893, he held for a brief period the leadership of the Ministry of Public Instruction of the Argentine Nation.

His family was related to Manuel Quintana, a third or fourth cousin of Enrique Santos Quintana.
