= Regiment of Patricians =

Regiment of the Argentine Army

1st Infantry Regiment "Los Patricios"
- Regimiento de Infantería 1 "Los Patricios"
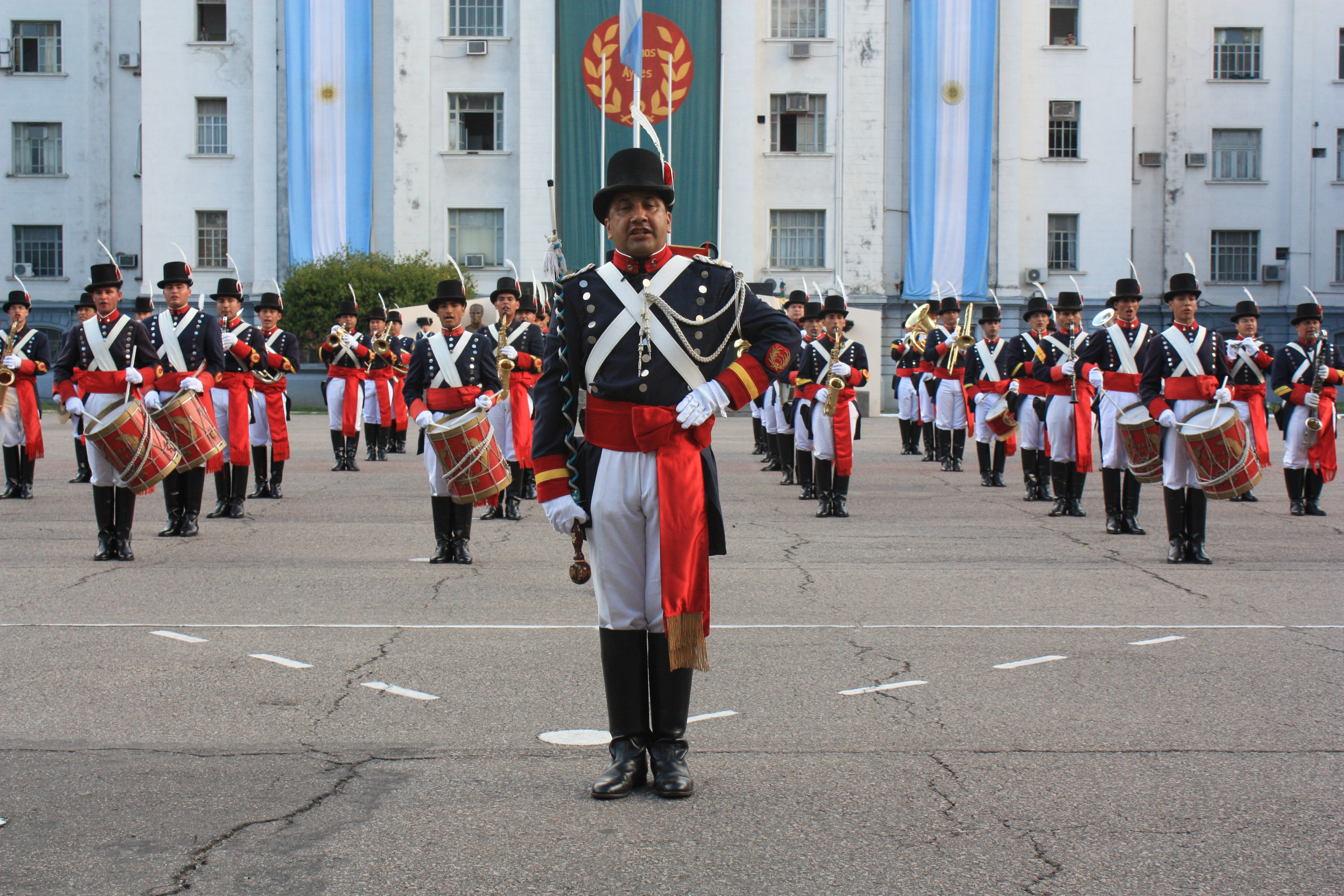
- The band of the Patricians' Regiment in ceremonial uniform, 2012
- Active: 1806–present
- Country: Argentina
- Branch: Argentine Army
- Type: Infantry Regiment
- Headquarters: Palermo, Buenos Aires
- Colors: (navy, red, white)
- March: El Uno de Patricios
- Engagements: British invasions of the River Plate; Argentine War of Independence; Cisplatine War; Anglo-French blockade of the Río de la Plata; Battle of Vuelta de Obligado; Battle of Caseros; Paraguayan War; Islas Malvinas War; La Tablada Barracks Attack
- Website: infanteria.com.ar/patricios

Insignia
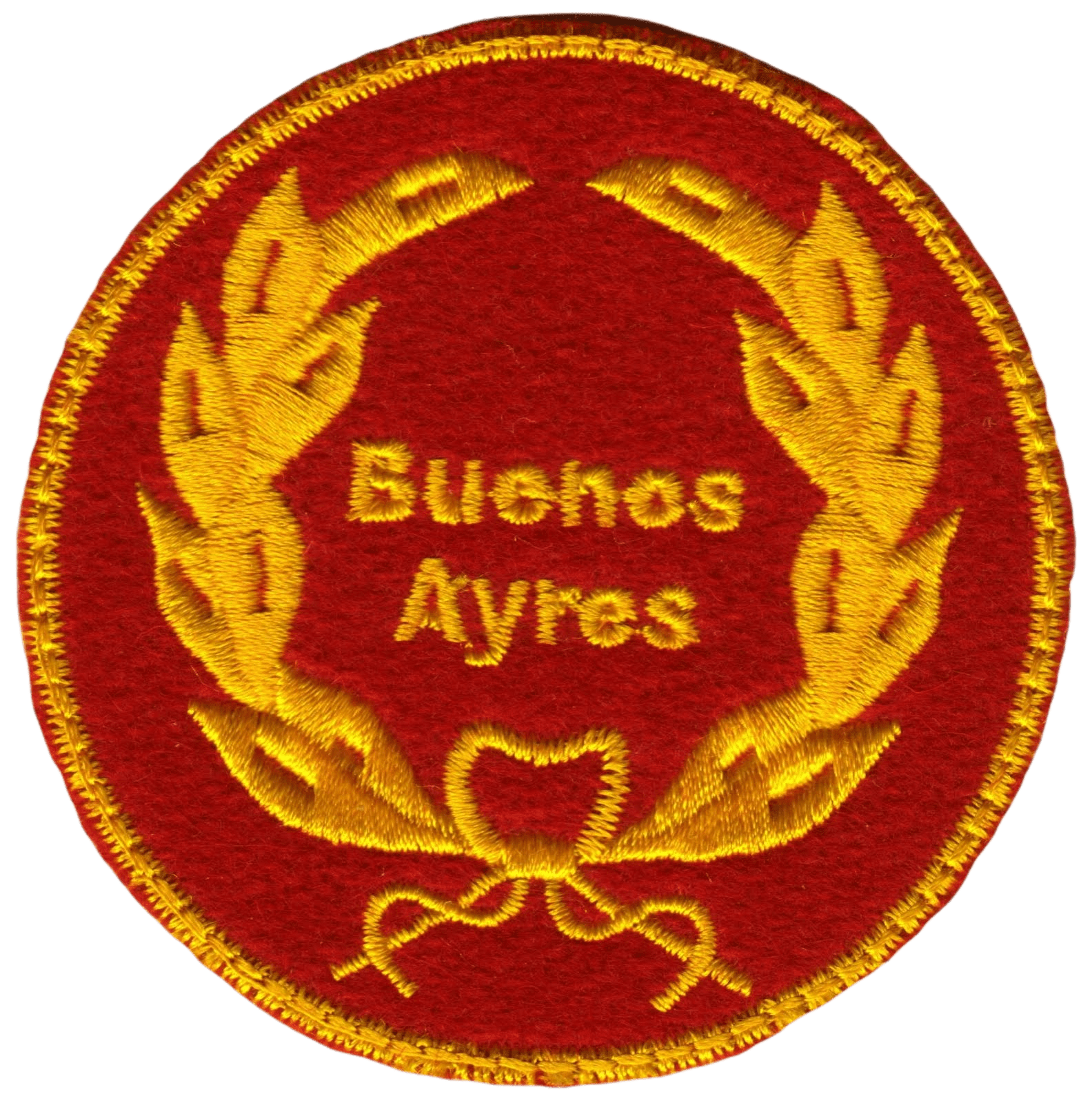
- Identification symbol

The 1st Infantry Regiment "Los Patricios" (Regimiento de Infantería 1 "Los Patricios") is the oldest regiment of the Argentine Army. The title is often shortened to the Patricians' Regiment (Regimiento de Patricios). Since the 1990s the regiment has been designated as air assault infantry. It is also the custodian of the Buenos Aires Cabildo, the welcoming party for visiting foreign dignitaries to Argentina and the escort, and honor guard battalion for the City Government of Buenos Aires. Since 22 September 2010, the Regiment's headquarters building has been a National Historical Monument following a declaration by the Argentine government on the occasion of the country's bicentennial year.

The regiment was formed as the Legión Patricia ("Patricians' Legion) from inhabitants of Buenos Aires in 1806 to fight against the British invasions of the River Plate. Among some of its first members, it included a woman, the Alférez (approximately, second lieutenant) Manuela Pedraza, one of the heroes of the Defense of Buenos Aires in 1806. The regiment, therefore, existed prior to Argentine independence. Their first commander was Cornelio Saavedra. The regiment also fought in May Revolution, Cisplatine War, Platine War, Paraguayan War, Dirty War, and Falklands War.

Although the word "Patrician" is usually employed as a synonym for aristocrat, in the naming of the Regiment it meant "the sons of the homeland" (Spanish "Patria" meaning "homeland"). Indeed, the original members of the Regiment were not aristocrats but Criollos, who were much farther down in the social hierarchy of the time.

== Creation ==
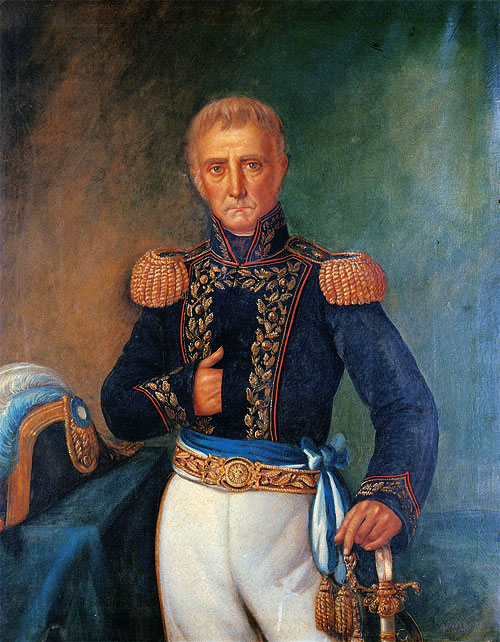
Cornelio Saavedra, first commander of the Patricians Regiment

Prior to the arrival of British troops, Viceroy Santiago de Liniers decided that volunteers are drawn from the population of Buenos Aires muster at the Fort on 15 September 1806. More than 4,000 men appeared, who had to be enrolled in other military units.

It was the largest and most powerful unit recruited for the Defense of Buenos Aires and, like other urban military units formed, was granted the privilege of electing its officers. The first election was held at the Consulate of Buenos Aires on November 8, 1806. Lieutenant Colonel Cornelio Saavedra was elected as head of the Corps or Legion and commander of the 1st Battalion, Esteban Romero was elected commander of the Second Battalion, and José Domingo Urien the Third Battalion commander. Manuel Belgrano was elected Sergeant Major (later replaced by Juan José Viamonte) and among other officers commissioned were Feliciano Chiclana, Vicente López y Planes, and Eustace Perdriel Gregorio Díaz Vélez.

St. Martin of Tours became the patron of the unit and on 9 November the regimental colors were consecrated with full ceremonial at the Cathedral of Buenos Aires along with that of the Arribeños Corps. The unit was then called the Buenos Aires Patrician Volunteer Urban Legion, with the status of a full Tercio or Colonial Regiment of Militia.

The Patricios Legion was made up of three battalions and the regimental HQ, with 23 companies of 50 men each (8 battalions I and III and seven in the II), with a total of 1,356 soldiers.

=== Composition of the Patricians Legion in 1807 ===
Patricians uniforms and ranks

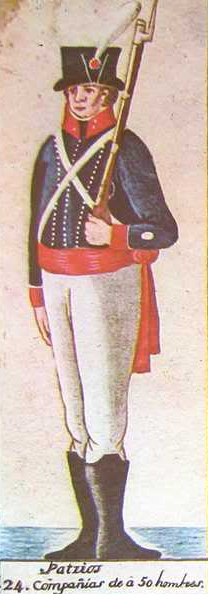
Conscript

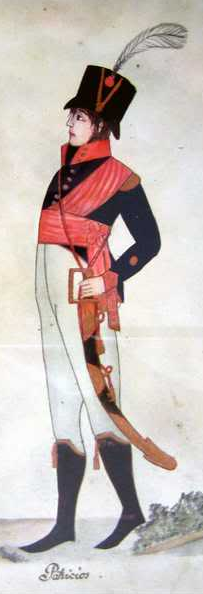
Commissioned officer

Regimental command

- Commander of the 1st Battalion and the Patricians Legion: Lt. Col. Cornelio Saavedra
- Commander of the 2nd Battalion: Major Esteban Romero
- Commander of the 3rd Battalion: Major Jose Domingo Urien
- Regimental Sergeant Major: Manuel Belgrano, later Juan Jose Viamonte
- 3 Adjutants
- 3 Flag Sublieutenants
- 2 Captains in reserve
- 3 Chaplains
- 3 Regimental Surgeons

Battalion composition

- 1st Battalion, Patricians Legion
  - 1st-8th Companies
- 2nd Battalion, Patricians Legion
  - 1st-7th Companies
- 3rd Battalion, Patricians Legion
  - 1st-8th Companies

In all: 69 Officers, 70 Sergeants, 20 Drummers, 179 Corporals, and 1,059 enlisted soldiers, for a total of 1,395 Patrician Legionnaires.

=== Baptism of fire ===
During the second British invasion of the River Plate, Saavedra was deployed to Colonia del Sacramento with a contingent of troops, but after the British captured Montevideo he returned to Buenos Aires in February 1807.

On 7 June 1807, during the battle of San Pedro in the Banda Oriental, the Spanish forces from Buenos Aires led by Francisco Javier Elio, including several companies of the Patricians Legion, were preparing to storm Colonia del Sacramento. The British, under Lt. Col. Denis Pack, attacked and defeated them.

The whole unit had its baptism of fire on 4 July 1807 when the British attacked Buenos Aires. The 1st and 2nd Battalions of the Patricios Legion were located in the Division of Right (red flag), while the 3rd Battalion was in the Reserve Division (Tricolor). The Legion, together with the other urban military battalions deployed, won that battle.

== Mutiny of Álzaga and the Patricians Corps ==
Shortly after its successful baptism of fire of 1807, Saavedra and the patricians made an important new service to the public.

On January 1, 1809, the Cabildo of Buenos Aires, with support from the Spanish military units, tried to replace the viceroy Liniers with a Government Junta headed by Martin de Álzaga and create the "American Spain", before the occupation of Europe by the advancing Napoleonic armies. This was known as the Mutiny of Álzaga. Cornelio Saavedra, with the legion under his command and the native personnel from the other battalions of militias managed to abort the move and ensure the authority of the viceroy, obtaining as a result of these developments the dissolution of the Spanish rebel units prompting the viceroy to reinstate full control over the military. It also cleared the way for the natives who sought independence.

Four companies were also found involved, the 3rd Battalion, Patricians Legion under Jose Domingo de Urien, and some officers of the other two battalions, such as Antonio José del Texo (a captain of one Battalion), Pedro Blanco and José Tomás Boys. Texo Urien was dismissed and sued for trying to kill Saavedra.

On January 13 the same year, as the Legion began to recover, it became the Patricians Corps by Royal orders via the Junta of Seville, and several of its officers received royal promotions. Several of the NCO's were commissioned into Sublieutenants.

== The 1809 reorganization and Upper Peru ==
As a result, on September 11, 1809, by order of the new Viceroy Baltasar Hidalgo de Cisneros, the 3rd Battalion was dissolved, leaving the corps with the 1st and 2nd Battalions in its rosters. It was due to a reorganization of Buenos Aires' urban military units.

Under the new regulations, all the military units assigned within Buenos Aires (including the Patricians Corps) would be composed of nine companies in every battalion, including grenadier companies. The regimental command, as well as the battalion staff composition, were then composed of the following in accordance with the new regulations:

- Commander
- Regimental Sergeant Major
- 2 Adjutants
- 2 Flag bearers
- Chaplain
- Surgeon
- 1 Drummer and 2 Fifers

The Patricians Corps continued to have battalion numbers in their names and its honorific name in practice, while the other military corps had their honorifics abolished.

Earlier in the year, the Chuquisaca Revolution in May and the La Paz revolution in July saw the second combat action of the Patricians. Led by captain Diego Basavilbaso, two companies of the Patricians Corps joined the pacification forces of Vicente Nieto and Colonel Jose de Cordoba in Upper Peru that October, ending the revolutions on October 31 that year with Chuquisaca (today's Sucre in Bolivia) reoccupied by the royalist forces.

== The May Revolution and the Patricians ==
The May Revolution's main protagonists, Saavedra and the Patricians Corps would be successful during the days leading up to May 25, 1810, open cabildo of Buenos Aires, which resulted to the Viceroy's forced resignation and the birth of the Primera Junta. This is the reason why the Patricians Regiment is often called The Sword of May.

Monday, May 14-Thursday, May 17
Upon hearing the news that by January, the Junta of Seville had fallen, Saavedra decided to let everyone take advantage of Napoleon's Peninsular Campaign to act against the Viceroyal government. He and Juan Jose Castelli suggested having an open cabildo for this purpose, as against Martin Rodriguez's plan of revolutionary action against the Viceroy.

Saturday, May 19
Saavedra then joined the meetings at the Pena residence, together with other military leaders. The meetings decided that he and Manuel Belgrano meet with the senior mayor of Buenos Aires, Juan Jose de Lezica, and Castelli meet with Julian de Levya, a procurator, to ask for their support for the holding of an open cabildo session, and tell them to go to the Viceroy to approve the plan

Sunday, May 20
Saavedra, as commander of the Patrician Corps, later attended the military officers meeting with the Viceroy at a fort, and together with the other officers, returned to the Pena residence that midnight for another meeting with the military officers.

Monday, May 21
A riot led by the Legion Infernal (Infernal Legion) which demanded an Open Cabildo meeting and was interrupting the work of the Cabildo was quickly stopped by Col. Saavedra and he then called on the crowds gathered at the Plaza de la Victoria (today's Plaza de Mayo) to leave at once.

Tuesday, May 22
The Open Cabildo session with Col. Saavedra as one of the invited delegates convened that day. The Patricians Corps, together with the other military units, were on alert and were garrisoned to prepare for any major commotion outside the Cabildo. This did not happen since the session went on peacefully.

Wednesday, May 23
Two days of sessions by the Open Cabildo finally resulted in the vote and resolution formally calling the Viceroy to conclude his duties. Just like the day earlier, the Patricians Corps was represented by Saavedra in the session. The Corps stood on alert all day to avoid riots and mass actions and to ensure a peaceful outcome of the session.

Thursday, May 24
The cabildo, now with the session done, formally announced the formation of a Junta with now ex-Viceroy Cisneros as president and Saavedra and Castelli as two of the four members (The two were Criollos while Spaniards occupied the other two). When news of it was known, everyone was shocked and as a result, Domingo French, the city mail carrier, and treasury employee Antonio Beruti led a mob that made its way to the Cabildo for Cisneros's new job was against the Cabildo's will of his full resignation. Col. Martin Rodriguez, who was there at the Cabildo told everyone inside that a revolt among the soldiery of the city was possible enough if some of them still had loyalties to Cisneros. The Patrician Corps was there at the plaza that day, ready for any commotion but this did not happen.

Saavedra and Castelli led a delegation that night to the Cisneros residence to report on what happened, as well as to recommend their (and Cisneros's) resignation from the new Junta being formed.

Friday, May 25
Despite the rains, a significant moment of the Patrician Regiment came that day.

That morning a big crowd plus a militia unit commanded by French and Beruti was at the Plaza de la Victoria for a demonstration asking for the dissolution of the Junta formed yesterday, Cisneros' resignation as its president and a formation of new Junta minus the former Viceroy. Then, the Cabildo was overrun and because the Cabildo hadn't met yet, the crowd began to stir.

By 9:00 the Cabildo began its work and issued an order for the dispersal of the crowd. The Patrician Corps led by Saavedra was there, together with the other military units whose commanders came to the Cabildo to ask for their compliance. But they didn't comply. Saavedra and some unit commanders were outside the Cabildo, and the commanders who were there told the Cabildo that the order could not be executed and obeyed. While this was happening the Patrician Corps was guarding the Cabildo and the surrounding streets, on orders from Eustoquio Diaz Velez, together with soldiers from the other militia battalions.

When the crowd went inside again, they were told to write to the Cabildo what they have been rallying for. Minutes after that a document with 411 signatures (still conserved) was delivered to the Cabildo, with illegible signatures made. (The full document was made by a Patricians Corps officer, Sublieutenant Nicolas Pombo de Otero.) The contents of the letter include:

- The formation of a new Junta with Saavedra as president, with 6 members and two secretaries
- The formation of a 500-man expedition to the viceregal provinces for assistance

Later, despite the rain, the Cabildo went to the balcony to ask for everyone's vote for the request to be ratified by all. Then, due to the heavy rain, the crowd thinned up, but several of them heard the request read aloud, and then approved it. Saavedra then spoke to everyone on what happened, and left the Cabildo on his way amid cannon salutes and bells, happy on his now concurrent posts as Patrician Corps Commander and as the new Junta President as well.

== The formation of the Patrican Regiments through the May 29 Decree ==
4 days after its formation, the new Primera Junta, led by Saavedra as its president, formally announced, through a May 29, 1810 proclamation, that the Buenos Aires Militia Battalions of Infantry are now the very first line infantry regiments, with the other service and arms regiments soon to be raised.

As a result, the Argentine Army was born, with the first units being that of the Patricians' Legion, by now the "Patricians" 1st and 2nd Infantry Regiments coming from the 1st and 2nd Battalions, Patricians Corps.

The order of June 8, 1810 (also by the First Junta) formally permitted racial integration into the new force of the mulattooes (blacks, pardos and natives) of the Castas Militia Battalion. They were to serve with a new regiment (the 3rd Inf. Regiment), while some servicemen from this battalion were to serve as part of the 2nd Infantry Regiment.

== Interior expeditions ==
On behalf of the First Junta and later of the Junta Grande, the Patricians Regiments went to the former viceregal provinces to formally ask for their inclusion into the new First Junta (and later the Great Junta) and to send their delegates, as well as for the liberation for the former viceregal towns and cities.

By June 8, they were part of the newly formed Army of the North commanded by Colonel Francisco Ortiz de Ocampo and Lieutenant Colonel Antonio Gonzales Balcarces as part of the Upper Peru campaign. The first companies of both regiments were included, and by November 3, these companies joined the newly formed 6th Infantry Regiment together with troops and officers from Tucuman and Santiago del Estero. The two companies represented the Patrician Regiments during the Army of the North's first battles.

By September, the 1st Coy., 1st Infantry Regt. and 1st Coy., 2nd Infantry Regt. joined and participated in the Paraguay campaign on behalf of their regiments.

March the next year saw representatives of the 1st and 2nd Infantry join the Liberation of Uruguay campaign as part of the Vanguard Division.

== Merger of the regiments and a new commander ==
Saavedra soon resigned as unit commander of the 1st Regiment on November 11, 1811, and was replaced by Manuel Belgrano. At the same day, the 1st and 2nd Infantry Regiments merged to become the 1st Infantry Regiment "Patricios" with Belgrano as the commander of the new regiment.

=== The 1811 Mutiny in the Trenches ===
On December 6, 1811, a mutiny led by a squad of the Patricians Regiment mutinied against their new commander, for the preservation of the regiment's privileges, now removed by the First Triumvirate. It ended in failure, and the mutinied squad was executed on December 11 the same year, on Bernardino Rivadavia's orders.

== The 1st Infantry Regiment in the battles for the nation ==
The merger, as well as other reasons, caused many problems for the new 1st Infantry Regiment. Despite it all, it participated in all other military actions on behalf of the First Triumvirate. Examples of such battles were the Battle of Tucuman, the Battle of Salta, the battles at Vilcapugio, Ayohuma, and the Battle of Sipe-Sipe, all led by their commander, Col. Belgrano. In 1812, he even presided over the creation of the Flag of Argentina in the presence of the Patricians Regiment of Foot in Rosario on February 20. Afterwards, it was placed in active service in Buenos Aires months after its Uruguayan deployment.

The regiment fought in the Argentina-Brazil War in 1827 and was disbanded in its aftermath, being replaced by the militia battalions of Buenos Aires, in a time of great troubles due to nationwide civil war. It was only in 1830 when Juan Manuel de Rosas honored the service of these battalions with the Patricians honorific, and the regiment was reinstated, just in time for Rosas's Desert Campaign in 1833, and moved on to Martin Garcia island in 1838. In 1846, the regiment was part of the Argentine land forces that fought in the historic Battle of Vuelta de Obligado.

== Organization of the modern 1st Infantry Regiment ==
Today, the 1st Infantry Regiment, while also serving as an air assault infantry regiment and is the Army's senior-most regiment of line infantry, serves primarily in the public duties role, as ceremonial guards of the Cabildo of Buenos Aires and Buenos Aires City Hall, co-shared with the Buenos Aires City Police, as well as of Army Headquarters, as the guard of honour of the Chief of Staff of the Army.

The modern regiment is organized as the 1st Battalion, 1st Infantry Regiment "Patricians", a single battalion infantry regiment as in the other units of the infantry (either line or light infantry) within the whole Army, with five combat companies (which also serve as ceremonial companies), a special forces company, the regimental band, and a services company. Its structure is as follows:

- Regimental HQ
  - Commanding Officer
  - Regimental Executive Officer and Chief of Staff
- "Reconquista" HQ and Services Company
- Regimental Band "Tambor de Tacuari"
- 1st Battalion, 1st Infantry Regiment "Patricians"
  - A Company "Buenos Ayres"
  - B Company "Curupaytí"
  - C Company "25 May"
  - D Company "Suipacha"
  - E Company "Defensa"
  - Commando Company (Air Assault) "Independence"

=== Tambor de Tacuari Regimental Band ===
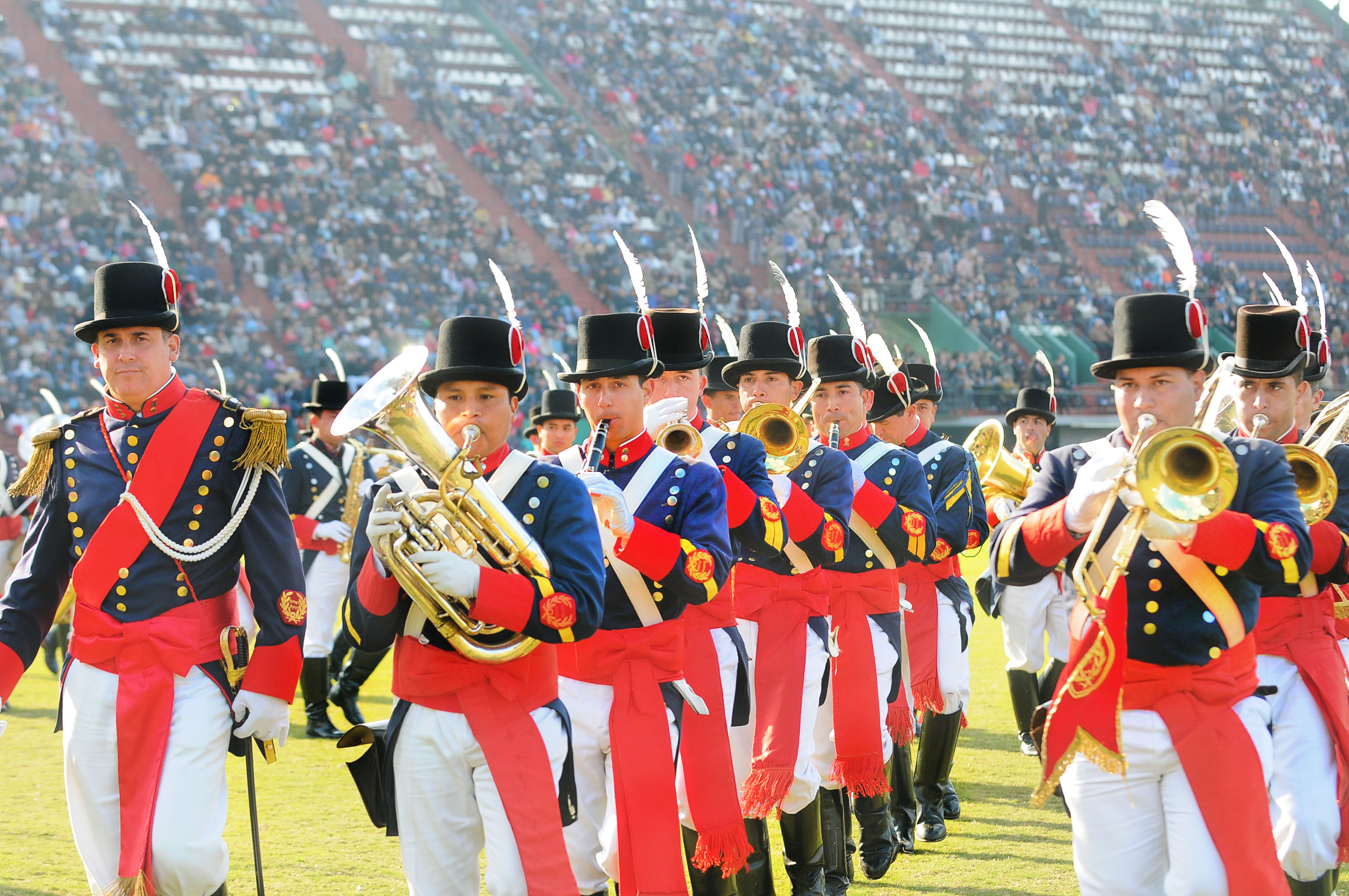
The Regimiental Band in 2016

The Tambor de Tacuari (Tacuari Drummer) Band of the Regiment of Patricians, established together with the Regiment in 1806, is the military band that serves as the regiment's musical support service. It is the only band in the nation to have a child musician (in occasions) serving among its ranks as a snare drummer, in memory of the young 12-year-old drummer Pedrito Rios from Concepcion del Uruguay, who died in action at the Battle of Tacuari in 1811, in which the band lends its name. The band today is led by its Director of Music, Captain Diego Cejas.

==== Regimental march "El Uno Grande" (The Great One) ====
Composed by Campos Pinto and Otantino Ambrosi, this is the official regimental march of the Patricios Regiment, played by the Tacuari Drummer Regimental Band.

===== Lyrics in Spanish =====
(Es) El Uno Grande entre los grandes,
Certinela firme siempre alerta,
forjado en el yunque de los Andes
en la horas de la Patria incierta.

Es Patricios en grito de guerra
que en Mayo la Patria escuchó
son la huestes del bravo Saavedra:
Buenos Aires Heroicos los vio. (repeat verse 1, then instrumental trio)

Vibren los sonoros clarines, con bravas notas de guerra
Llegando hasta los confines del monte, el llano y la sierra
Y si un día la voz de la Patria a la lucha llamara,
Recordemos entonces a aquellos ilustres varones
que en Curupaytí, Salta y Tucumán, abatieron pendones en homérica lid. (optional repeat)

===== Lyrics in English =====
(Here is) The Great One of all the greats
Sentinels on attention, always alert,
Formed from the lowlands of the Andes
In the crucial hours of the Fatherland.

It's Patricians, the war cry
That in May, the Fatherland heard
It's the armies of brave Saavedra,
Buenos Aires heroic saw them.(repeat verse 1, then instrumental trio)

The loud bugles vibrate, with brave war notes
Reaching the confines of the hills, plains and mountains
And if one day the voice of the Fatherland calls us to battle,
Let us remember then those illustrious men
That in Curupaytí, Salta and Tucumán, captured the colours like in Homer's days. (optional repeat)

== See also ==
- Argentine War of Independence for a brief history of the Regiment's first battles post-independence
- List of Argentine Army regiments for a list of the Regiment's companion units
