= Saturnino Blanco Nardo =

Comandante of Yaguareté Corá
- In office 1820–1821

Personal details
- Born: 18th century Corrientes
- Died: 19th century Corrientes
- Occupation: Politician
- Profession: Army officer

Military service
- Allegiance: Republic of Entre Ríos – until 1821; United Provinces of the River Plate
- Years of service: c. 1810–1840s
- Rank: Captain
- Battles/wars: Argentine Civil Wars

Saturnino Blanco Nardo (c. 1790– ?) was an Argentine military man and politician, who served as congressman and commander of Yaguareté Corá (Corrientes, Argentina).

== Biography ==
He was born in Corrientes, Argentina, belonging to a Creole family of Asturian ancestry. He took an active part in the civil-military conflicts, serving under the orders of the General Francisco Ramírez against José Gervasio Artigas. In 1821, he served as a congressman for Yaguareté Corá in Corrientes Province. That same year he was promoted to the rank of captain, serving as commander-in-chief of the towns of San Miguel and Yatebú.
