= Juan Gregorio Lemos =

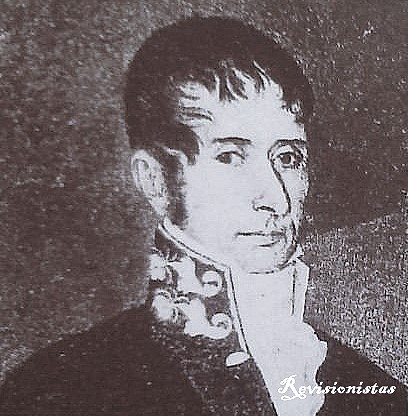
- Portrait of Juan Gregorio Lemos
- Born: Juan Gregorio Lemos Corvalán; May 24, 1764; Mendoza, Captaincy General of Chile
- Died: October 1822 (aged 58); Lima, Peru
- Spouse: Josefa Tiburcia Castañer Salas
- Military career
- Allegiance: (Argentina) United Provinces of the River Plate
- Branch: Argentine Army
- Rank: General
- Unit: Army of the Andes
- Conflicts: Chilean War of Independence; Battle of Chacabuco; Battle of Cancha Rayada; Battle of Maipú

Juan Gregorio Lemos (1764-1822) was an Argentine military man and politician who served in the Army of the Andes under the command of General San Martín. He had outstanding participation in the politics of the province of Mendoza, exerting diverse public positions.

== Biography ==
Lemos was born on May 24, 1764, in Mendoza, Argentina and was baptized on July 16 of the same year in the parish San Nicolás de Tolentino. His parents were Onofre Lemos y Ladrón de Guevara and María Antonia Corvalán de Castilla y Escalante Videla, belonging to a distinguished Creole family. He did his elementary studies in the Colegio Nacional de Monserrat.

In 1803, Lemos served as Alférez in the Regimiento Voluntarios de Caballería de Mendoza, being promoted to lieutenant of the same regiment in 1809. In 1810, he requested the discharge of the army to occupy the position of Regidor of the city Council of Mendoza and then designated as Customs Administrator of that province until 1815.

In 1816, Lemos was designated as Comisario de Guerra (Commissar of War) and Intendant General of the Army of the Andes. He took part in the battles of Chacabuco, Cancha Rayada, and Maipú. In 1820, Lemos accompanied General San Martín in his expedition to Peru, participating in the Declaration of Independence of that country on July 28, 1821.

Juan Gregorio Lemos was married in Buenos Aires to Josefa Tiburcia Castañer Salas, daughter of Martín Castañer Calumer, born in Canet de Mar, and María Isabel Salas Díaz, born in the city.
