= Domingo Pelliza =

Domingo Pelliza Brignole

Mayordomo of Buenos Aires
- In office 1749–1757
- Monarch: Ferdinand VI
- Preceded by: Carlos Sartores
- Succeeded by: Justo de Robles

Personal details
- Born: Domenico Brignole Pelliza; 1700s Genoa, Italy
- Died: 1770s Buenos Aires, Argentina
- Occupation: Politician merchant
- Profession: Militia
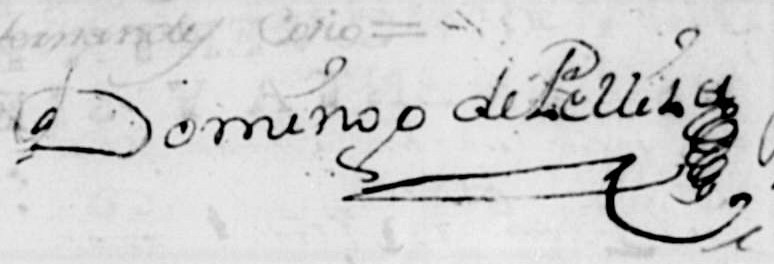
- Signature

Military service
- Allegiance: Spain
- Branch/service: Spanish Army
- Years of service: c. 1730 – c. 1750
- Rank: Captain
- Commands: Milicias Españolas de Buenos Aires

Domingo Pelliza (c. 1700 – c. 1770) was a politician and merchant of Genoese noble ancestry. He held several council posts in the City Council of the Viceroyalty of Peru, serving as Alcalde (Mayor) of "Hermandad" and Mayordomo of Buenos Aires.

== Biography ==
Domingo Pelliza was born in La Spezia, Genoa to Giuseppe Brignole and Maria Pelliza. He was married to Magdalena Comparetti on 10 October 1700 in the church of San Andres de Panigaglia in La Spezia. He belongs to the Brignole family of the Marchionesses di Gropoli, in Genoa - Italy.

After the death of his first wife, Pelliza settled in Buenos Aires around 1738 and formed a family with María Rosa de Rubio y Rodriguez Carrillo, a woman from a well-known creole family. He travelled with his sister Micaela Pelliza Brignole, who married Manuel Duarte en Buenos Aires.

In 1747, he married María Thomasa de Morales, daughter of José de Morales and Dionisia de Gil. In 1749, he became Prior of the Third Order of Saint Dominic at the Saint Dominic Church in Buenos Aires.

The Mayordomo of Buenos Aires was the person in charge of the administration of the local economy in colonial Argentina. In 1757, Domingo Pelliza was replaced by Justo de Robles. in 1766, Pelliza was appointed as alcalde of campaign, serving in the suburbs of Buenos Aires.

In addition to carrying out police and militia tasks in the Río de la Plata, Pelliza also engaged in trade and agriculture, as he owned several lots of land and properties in Buenos Aires.

== Descendants ==
Pelliza and Comparetti produced a son, Juan Felix Pelliza Comparetti, who became the Captain of the Royal Army of Spain and Governor of the Castle of Alconchel in Murcia. Her son Captn. Raymundo Pelliza de Morales, married Maria de Videla y Correa de Saa of Mendoza City, the daughter of a prominent well known family, descendant of the co-founders of Mendoza from the Videla's, and the founders of Rio de Janeiro from the Correia de Sa, noble portuguese family.

Another of the Domingo Pelliza's sons, Antonio Pelliza de Morales, married María Lorenza de Acasuso, the granddaughter of Domingo de Acassuso, the founder of San Isidro. Colonel Jose Maria Pelliza Gomez del Canto y Rospigliosi, colonel of the argentinian army, married Virginia de Pueyrredon, daughter of Juan Martin de Pueyrredon, with descendants Pelliza Pueyrredon, in Buenos Aires.

Maria Magdalena Pelliza de Echeverria, the daughter of Capitan Felix Pelliza Comparetti and the granddaughter of Domingo Pelliza, became Dame of the Royal Order of Noble Dames of Queen Maria Luisa de Bourbon Parma, wife to Charles IV. Maria Magdalena married Brigadier General Jose Alvarez de Faria y Sanchez Zarzosa de Madrid.

Pelliza's grandson Pedro Joseph Pelliza de Videla y Correa de Saa was a governor of Mendoza City from 1833 to 1836. He married her cousin Thomasa Vargas Machuca del Cerro Jurado y Correa de Sa on 1805. Their descendants are the Ibanez de Pelliza in Mendoza City, Argentina.
