= Batallón de Voluntarios Rebajados de Buenos Aires =

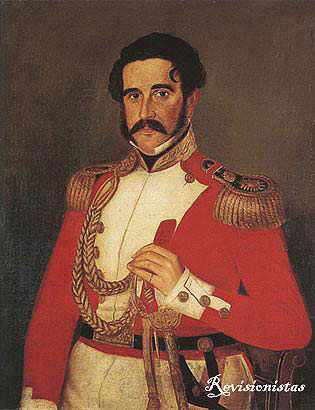
- Colonel Joaquín Ramiro
- Disbanded: 1852
- Country: Argentina
- Allegiance: Argentine Confederation
- Branch: Argentine Army
- Type: Infantry
- Engagements: Batalla de Quebracho Herrado; Battle of Costa Brava; Sitio de Montevideo; Batalla de la Vuelta de Obligado; Batalla de Caseros

Batallón de Voluntarios Rebajados de Buenos Aires was a 19th-century Argentine military unit formed mainly with veterans of the Brazilian War and the expeditionaries to the Desert of 1833 and 1834 (Desert Campaign (1833–34)). It was a special unit of the Federal Party of active participation during the civil war between federales and unitarios.

It was one of the military units sent from Buenos Aires to serve during the Siege of Montevideo. Some 360 members of 3rd Escuedrón of the Batallón de Rebajados took part in the Battle of Quebracho Herrado against the Unitarian troops of Juan Lavalle.

== History ==
It was an infantry unit created in 1840 during the government of Juan Manuel de Rosas, who appointed Colonel Joaquín Ramiro as commander of the battalion. This military unit had militia companies of cazadores, granaderos and artilleros. It was one of the military units in which Rosas counted, to protect the city of Buenos Aires when occurred the Invasion of Lavalle.

This unit took an active part in the Batalla de Costa Brava, occurred on August 15 and 16, 1842 in the Province of Corrientes against the troops of Giuseppe Garibaldi. In 1843, the Batallón of Rebajados of Buenos Aires traveled to the Banda Oriental to support the forces of Manuel Oribe, having an active participation during the Guerra Grande.

Messengers of this battalion were entrusted to deliver the correspondence of Manuel Oribe to the consuls of France and England during the armistice of 1847. The Rebajados de Buenos Aires served throughout the siege of Montevideo until the fall of Manuel Oribe in 1851. This Battalion also took part in the Battle of Vuelta de Obligado, against the Anglo-French squads that invaded the waters of the Parana River on November 20, 1845.

Several officers belonging to the battalion corps of Rebajados participated in the persecution of political opponents of Juan Manuel de Rosas, and in the compliance with the laws decreed by his government. A veteran officer of this unit, Lieutenant Sinforoso Canaveris is registered in the files of the Central Police Department, concerning an incident that he had with a citizen for the no use of the divisa federal, during the celebrations for the anniversary of the Revolution of the Restorers (October 1840).

The uniform of this unit was red, similar to other military corps of the Argentine Confederation, and had an armament composed of spears and facon, with some soldiers equipped with single-shot carbines. The officers of this unit were armed with saber and flintlock pistols, and wore red jacket uniform with its respective divisa federal. According to the British Packett, this Battalion wore an arrogant appearance during its entry into the battlefield, and according to the same newspaper the officers uniform was similar to that used by the English army.

This battalion had an excellent military band, which had great acceptance from the public of Buenos Aires during the patriotic and government parades held in honor of Juan Manuel de Rosas.

== Great Siege of Montevideo ==
List of the Plana Mayor of the 1st Battalion of Voluntarios Rebajados of Buenos Aires during the Siege of Montevideo.

- Joaquín Ramiro, colonel
- Pedro M. Brizuela, lieutenant colonel
- Bernabé Galeano, major
- Cosme Pader, captain
- Sinforoso Canaveris, 1st lieutenant
- Manuel Esmilar, 2nd lieutenant
- Martín José Sosa, second lieutenant
- Floro Leonetti, second lieutenant
- José Hernandez, 1st sergeant
- Pedro Miranda, 1st sergeant

These officers and sub officers took part during the entire Siege of Manuel Oribe to Montevideo (1843-1851).

== Gallery ==
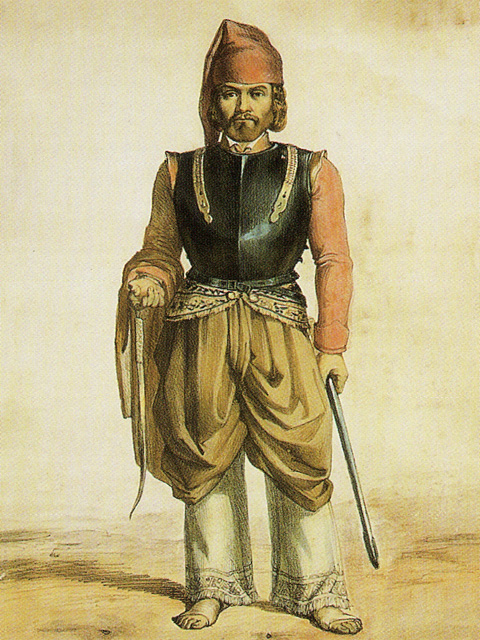
Federal soldier uniform similar to the Rebajados Battalion

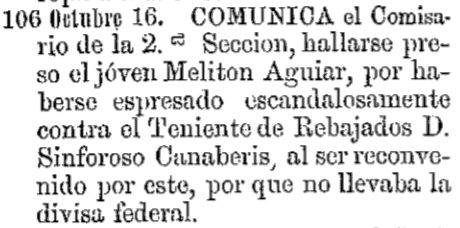
Lieutenant of Rebajados Sinforoso Canaveris October 16, 1840

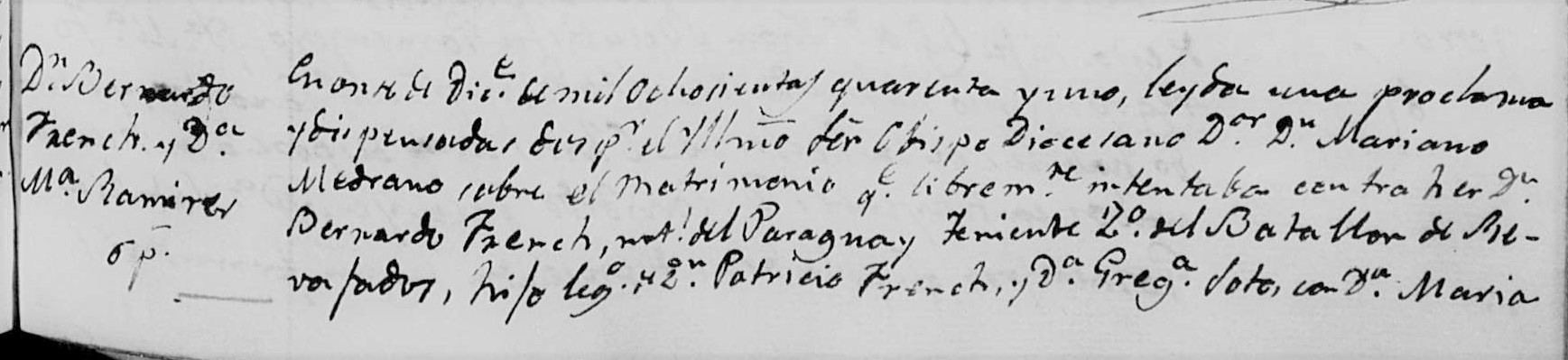
Marriage of Bernardo French (French family) 2nd lieutenant of Batallón of Rebajados (December 11, 1841)

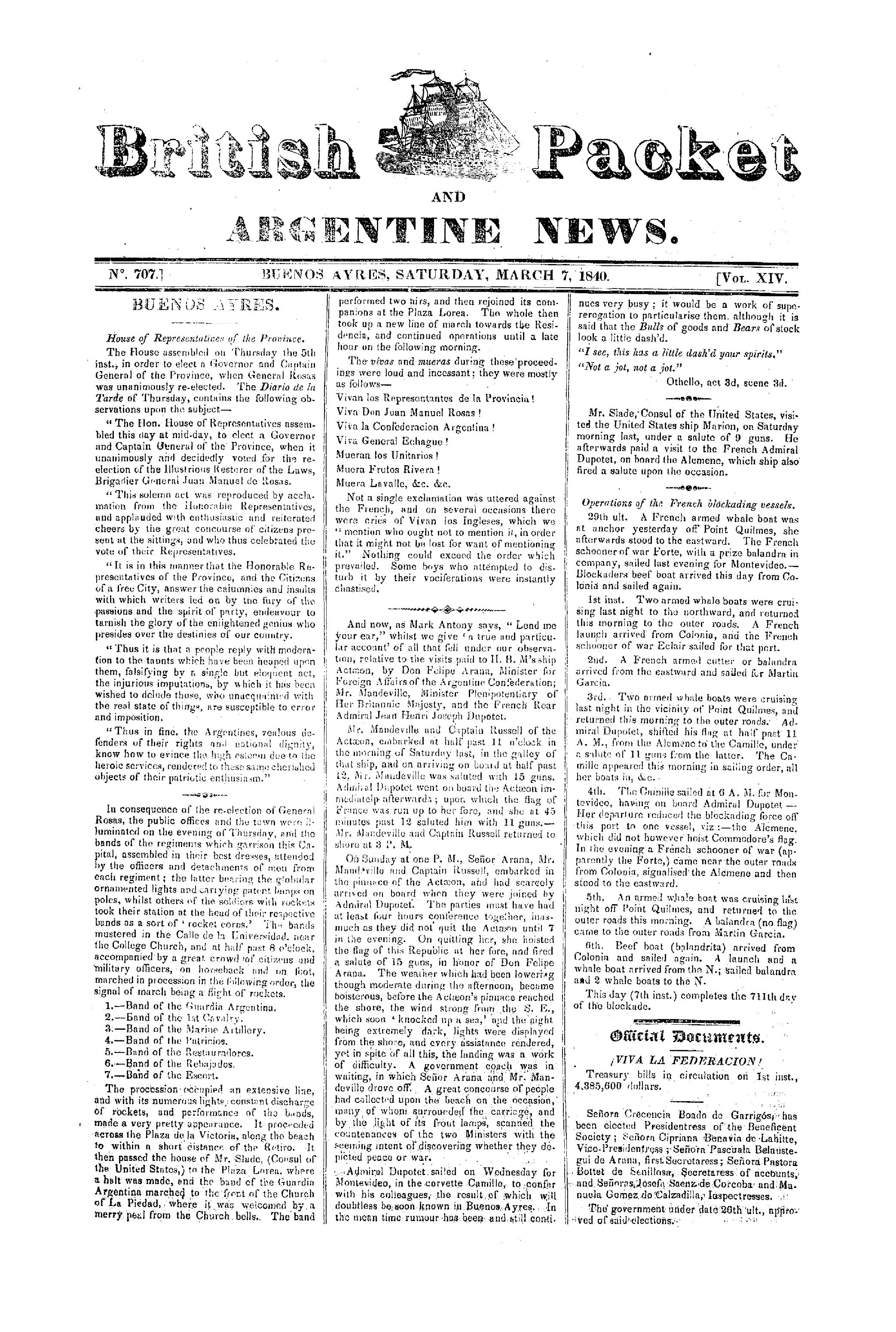
Cover of the British Packett with news about the military bands of the army of Rosas

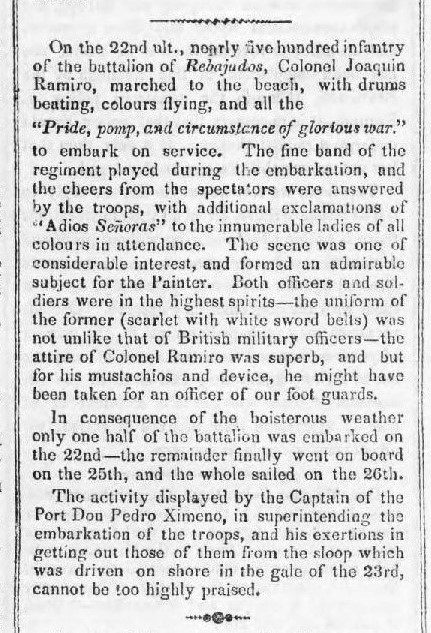
News concerning the Musical Band of Rebajados (July 30, 1842)

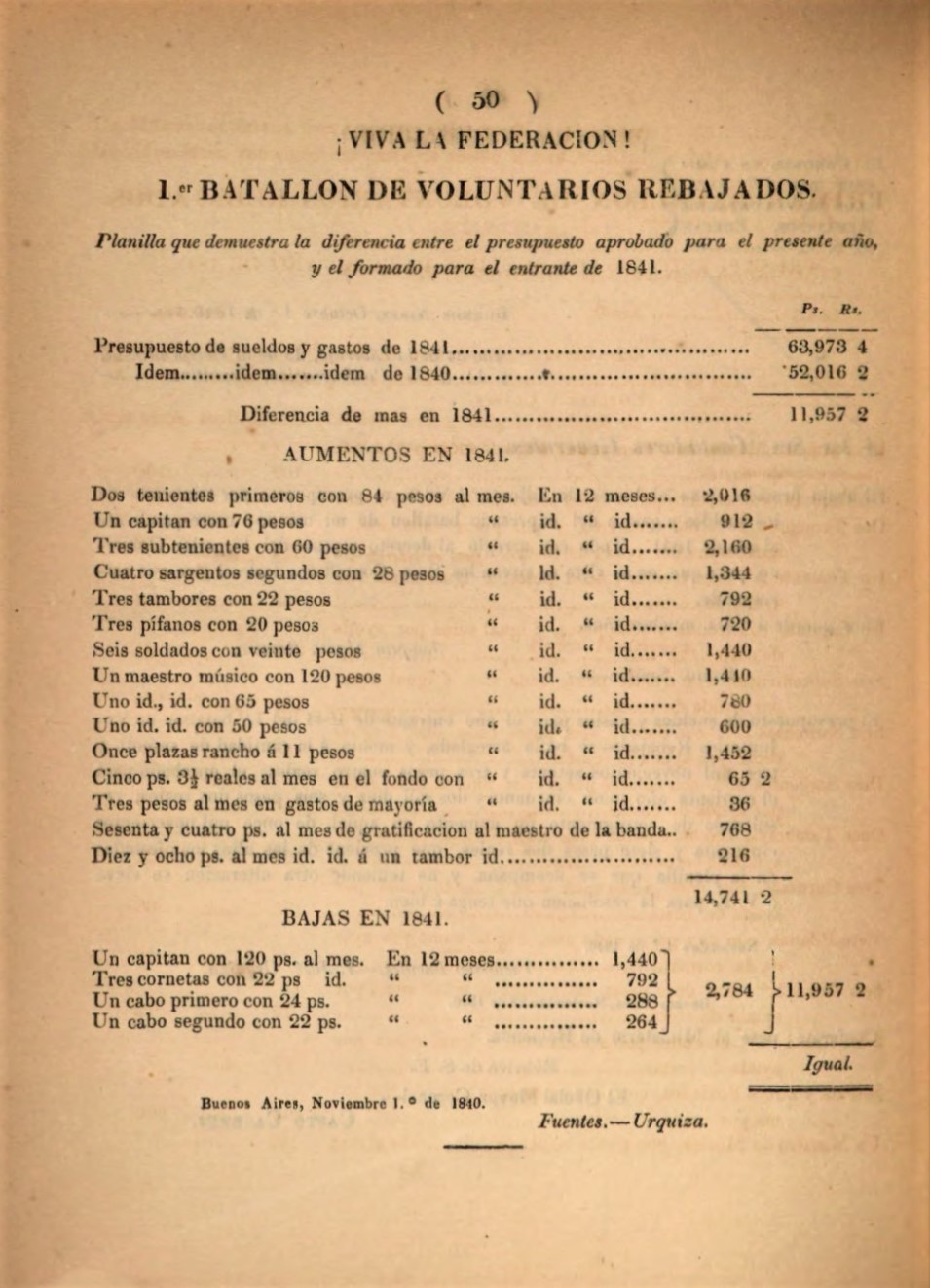
Salaries of the 1st Battalion in 1841

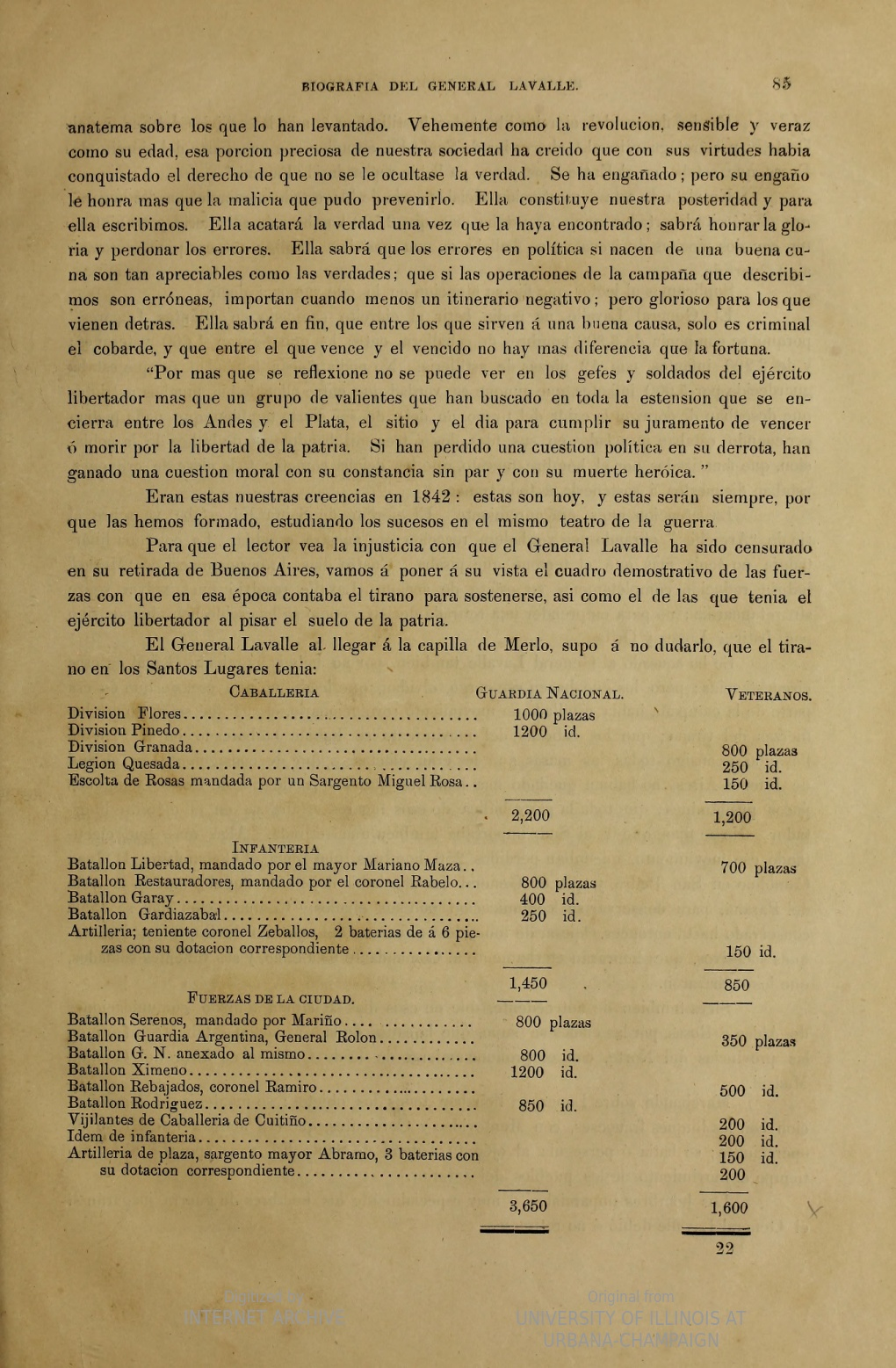
Record about the armies of Rosas during the invasion of Juan Lavalle in 1840

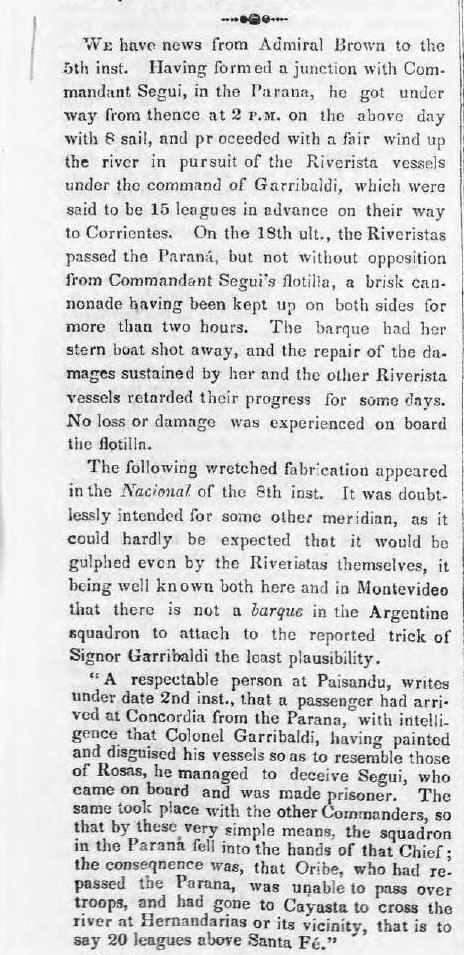
news regarding the Battle of Costa Brava

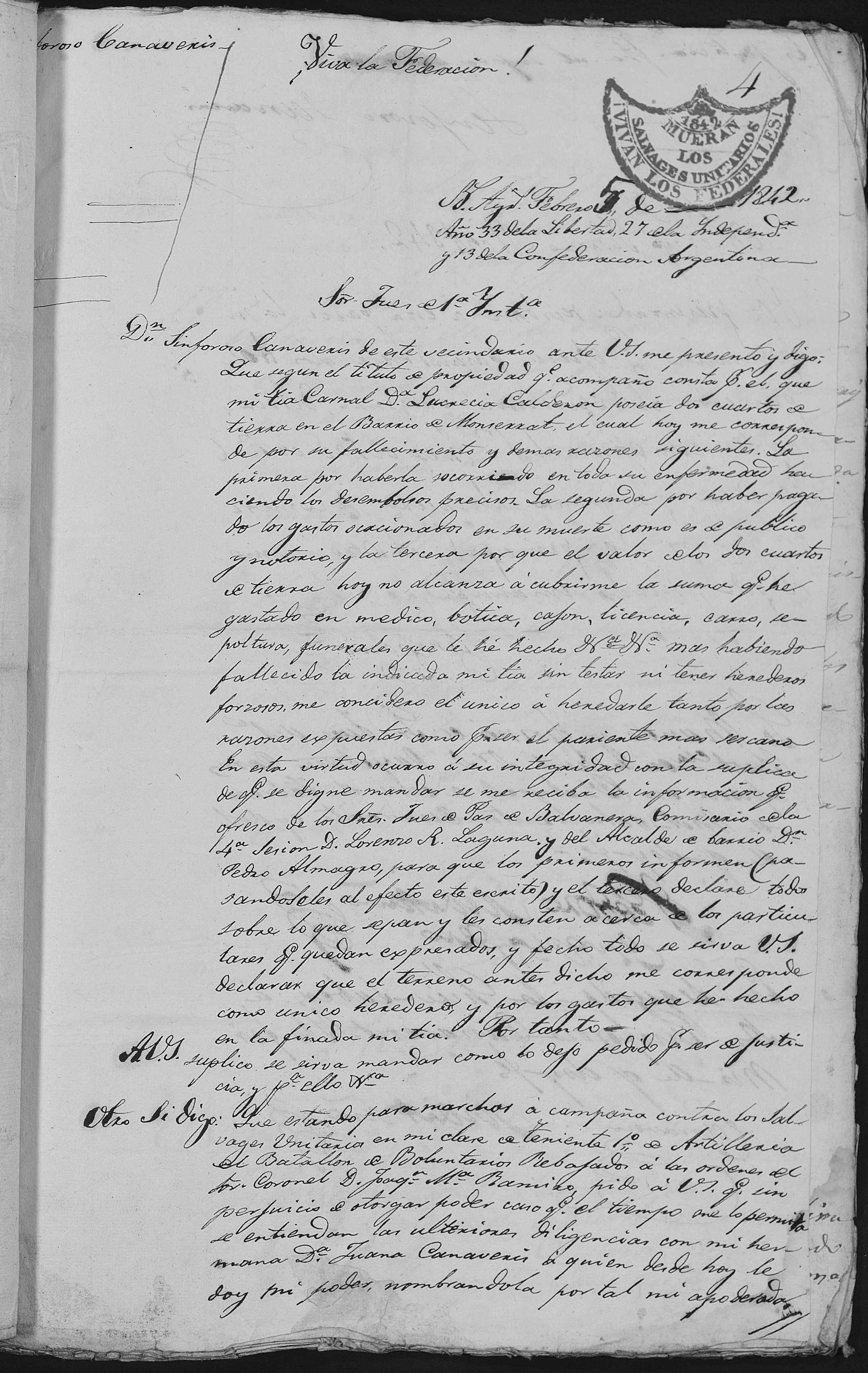
record referring to Lieutenant Canaveris

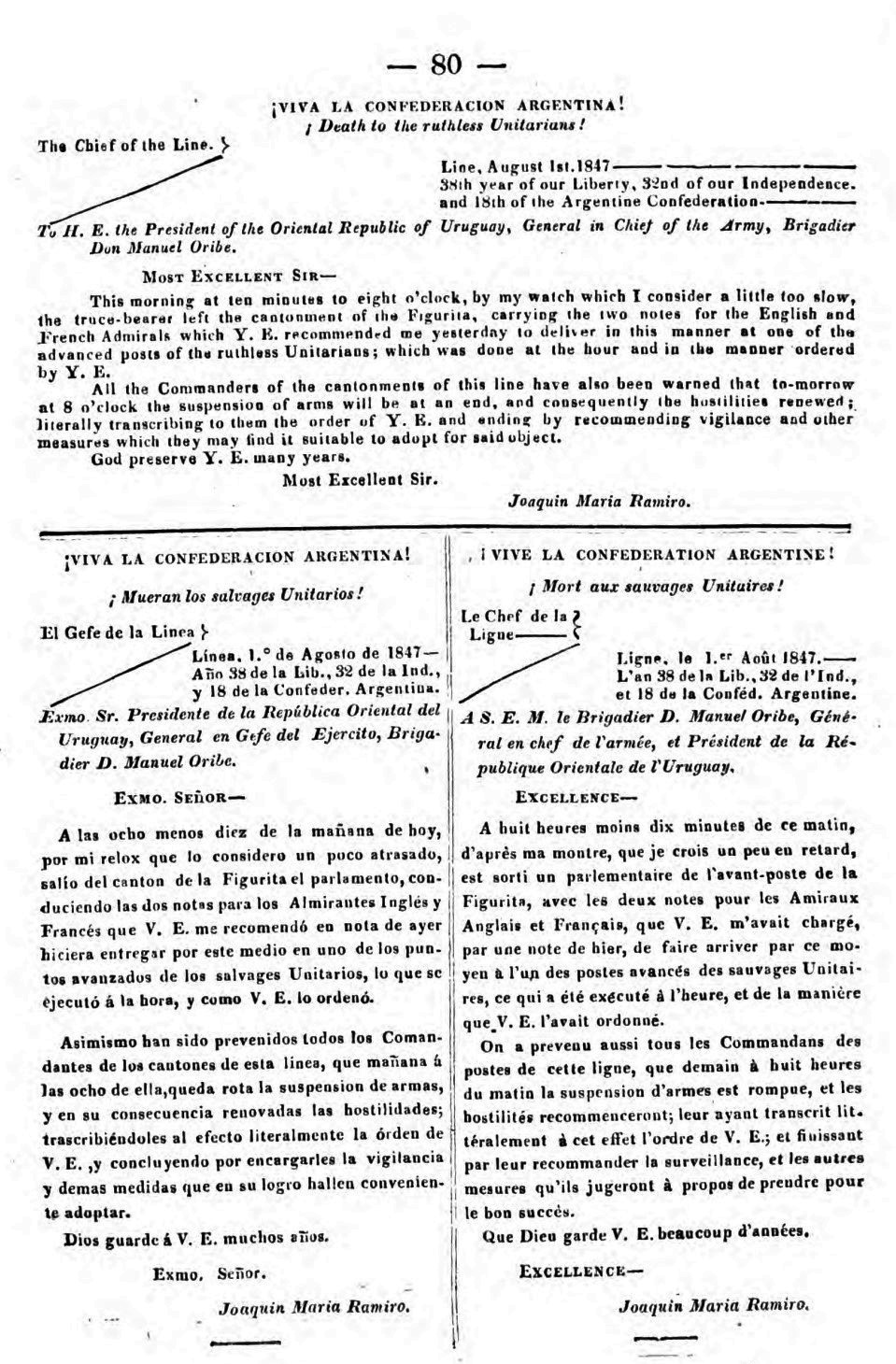
Transcription of correspondence of Joaquín Ramiro to Manuel Oribe in 1847
