= Mutiny of Álzaga =

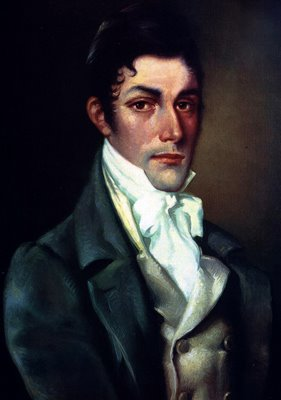
- Portrait of Martín de Álzaga
- Date: January 1, 1809
- Location: Buenos Aires
- Participants: Martín de Álzaga and supporters
- Outcome: Mutiny defeated and leaders trialed. The supporting military units were disbanded.

The Mutiny of Álzaga (Spanish: Asonada de Álzaga) was an ill-fated attempt to remove Santiago de Liniers as viceroy of the Viceroyalty of the Río de la Plata. It took place on January 1, 1809, and it was led by the merchant Martín de Álzaga. The troops of Cornelio Saavedra, head of the Regiment of Patricians, defeated it and kept Liniers in power.

== Development ==
Liniers and Álzaga were heroes of the resistance against the British invasions of the Río de la Plata, and afterward Liniers was designated as viceroy, replacing Rafael de Sobremonte. Álzaga sought that role as well, and attempted to remove Liniers from power. The chance came when the Peninsular War took place in Spain, with the king Ferdinand VII being taken prisoner by Napoleon.

Álzaga's ally, Francisco Javier de Elío, created a Junta in the city of Montevideo, and Álzaga attempted to do the same in Buenos Aires.

For this end he tried to promote rulings that Liniers would be likely to reject, such as the designation of Bernardino Rivadavia as ensign, or new designations of members of the Buenos Aires Cabildo, full of enemies of Liniers. However, the viceroy reluctantly agreed to both things.

The members of the Cabildo decided to go on with their plan anyway. They gathered a group of sympathizers in the Plaza, and the bulk of the Cabildo, the priest of the city, the Real Audience and the Consulate appeared at the Fort, requesting Liniers's resignation. Liniers was ready to sign it, but Saavedra dispersed the rioters and stopped the formalization of the resignation.

Liniers thought that, as the population rejected him, he should resign. Saavedra argued that the rioters were not the population and asked him to look at the Plaza, which was now filled with supporters of Liniers. Thus he gave up his idea of resigning and stayed in power.

== Consequences ==
As a consequence of the failure of the mutiny, the leaders of it were judged and imprisoned at Carmen de Patagones. The peninsular military groups that supported it were disbanded, remaining only the ones composed by Criollos, who increased their political power in the city.

== Historical perspectives ==
Historian Bartolomé Mitre explained the mutiny of Álzaga and the May Revolution as closely related events, with the former being an antecedent of the later. This approach was rejected by Vicente Fidel López, who described Álzaga as highly pro-Spanish, decided monarchist and keeper of the Spanish integrity against the goals of the Criollos. He interpreted the events as mere domestic policy, a dispute about who was more loyal to the king, and deemed Álzaga as counter-revolutionary for acting against the goals of the factions that would eventually prevail in the May Revolution a year later. Later historians would accept López's version as canonical.

The mutiny was later studied by Enrique de Gandía and Enrique Williams Álzaga, who described it as a clear independentist attempt: Álzaga would have been seeking to remove Liniers and replace him with a Junta, with the purpose of declaring full independence in the case the Spanish government failed completely in Europe. Ernesto Palacio thought that, instead of a victory of Criollos over Peninsulars, it was a victory of conformism and conservatism over a revolutionary will.

== Bibliography ==
- Scenna, Miguel Ángel (2009). Mariano Moreno. Buenos Aires: H. Garetto Editor. ISBN 978-987-1494-05-4.
