= Mosconi =

Mosconi may refer to:

== People ==
- Alain Mosconi (born 1949), French swimmer, Olympic medalist and previous world record holder
- Antonio Mosconi (1866–1955), Italian politician
- Ariel Edgardo Torrado Mosconi (born 1961), Argentine bishop
- Enrico Mosconi (1843-1910), Italian engineer
- Enrique Mosconi (1877–1940), Argentine military engineer
- Germano Mosconi (1932–2012), sports journalist and television anchorman
- Judah Leon ben Moses Mosconi (born 1328), Bulgarian scholar and Talmudist
- Lisa Mosconi, Italian American neuroscientist
- Paolo Mosconi (1914–1982), Italian archbishop, Vatican diplomat
- Willie Mosconi (1913–1993), American professional pool player from Philadelphia, Pennsylvania

== Places ==
- Mosconi, Salta, a municipality in Salta, Argentina
- General Mosconi, Chubut, district of Comodoro Rivadavia, Argentina
- General Enrique Mosconi International Airport
- Mosconi, a restaurant in Luxembourg

== See also ==
- Mosconi Cup, an annual nine-ball pool tournament contested between teams representing Europe and the United States since 1994, named in honour of Willie Mosconi
- Moscone (disambiguation)
