= Juan Emilio Ameri =

Argentine politician

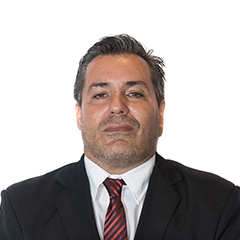

National Deputy
- In office 18 December 2019 – 25 September 2020
- Constituency: Salta

Personal details
- Born: 25 May 1973 (age 52) Buenos Aires, Argentina
- Party: Victory Party
- Other political affiliations: Front for Victory (2003–2017); Frente de Todos (2019–2020)

Juan Emilio Ameri (born 25 May 1973) is an Argentine retired politician, who was a National Deputy representing Salta Province from 2019 to 2020. A member of the Victory Party, Ameri assumed office on 12 December 2019 to fill in the vacancy left by Sergio Leavy. Ameri was expelled from Congress in September 2020 following a sex scandal during a live parliamentary commission meeting.

== Early and personal ==
Ameri was born on 25 May 1973 in Buenos Aires, son of Oscar Ameri and Lidia Beatriz Romero. During the 1990s, Ameri was a member of the Club Atlético River Plate barra brava. Ameri found employment in the club's administrative offices following an incident in 2001 in which Ameri lost an eye during clashes with the police. He moved to Salta in 2010, and worked as a private security agent.

In Salta, Ameri married a Victory Party politician, Alejandra Escudero. Ameri and Escudero had three daughters, Constanza, Evita and Malvina.

== Political career ==
Ameri's political career began in El Aguante, an organization within the Victory Party led by his wife, Alejandra Escudero. In 2013, he became an employee at the provincial government of Salta during the administration of Juan Manuel Urtubey. That year, he ran for a seat in the Salta City Council as part of the El Aguante list in the Victory Party primary elections, losing against the lists of Abel Moya and Mario Moreno. He would run again, with a similarly unsuccessful result, in 2015.

In the 2017 legislative election, Ameri was the third candidate in the Frente Ciudadano para la Victoria list to the Argentine Chamber of Deputies, behind Sergio Leavy and Nora Giménez. The list came third in the general election, with 23.24% of the vote, and only Leavy was elected to the Chamber. In the 2019 election, both Leavy and Giménez were elected to the Senate, and Ameri was called to in to fill Leavy's vacancy. He was sworn in on 18 December 2019.

=== Controversies and scandal ===
Before taking office as deputy, Ameri had been subject to accusations of abuse, violence and harassment by fellow members of the Victory Party.

On 24 September 2020, during an online session of a parliamentary commission debating provincial debt renegotiation, Ameri was inadvertently caught on camera kissing the bare breasts of a woman (later identified as his girlfriend). The act was livestreamed on the Chamber of Deputies' TV and YouTube channel. As soon as other lawmakers drew Ameri's attention, he apologized and stated he was unaware his camera was still on. Within an hour, the Chamber unanimously resolved to suspend Ameri. He would later be forced to resign from his seat.

The scandal was widely condemned by politicians and parties from the Opposition and from the governing coalition. The national president of the Victory Party, Diana Conti, called on the Salta chapter to expel Ameri from the party. Senators Leavy and Giménez, both from the Salta Victory Party, also repudiated Ameri.

Ameri was succeeded in his seat by Alcira Figueroa.
