= Sergio Leavy =

Argentine politician

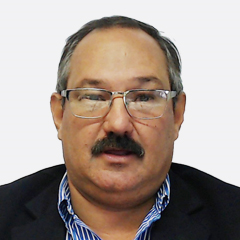

National Senator
- Incumbent
- Assumed office 10 December 2019
- Constituency: Salta

National Deputy
- In office 10 December 2017 – 10 December 2019
- Constituency: Salta

Mayor of Tartagal
- In office 10 December 2007 – 11 April 2018
- Preceded by: Darío Valenzuela
- Succeeded by: Eduardo Leavy (acting)

Provincial Deputy of Salta
- In office 10 December 2003 – 10 December 2007
- Constituency: General San Martín Department

Personal details
- Born: 22 November 1963 (age 62) San José de Metán, Argentina
- Party: Justicialist Party (until 2003); Victory Party (2003–present)
- Other political affiliations: Front for Victory (2003–2017); Citizen's Unity (2017–2019); Frente de Todos (since 2019)
- Education: Universidad del Salvador

Sergio Napoleón "Oso" Leavy (born 22 November 1963) is an Argentine businessman and politician, currently serving as a National Senator for Salta Province since 2019. A member of the Victory Party and president of the party's Salta chapter, Leavy previously served as a National Deputy from 2017 to 2019, as intendente (mayor) of Tartagal, Salta from 2007 to 2017, and as a member of the provincial Chamber of Deputies from 2003 to 2007.

== Early life and career ==
Leavy was born on 22 November 1963 in San José de Metán, Salta Province. His mother, Nelly Martínez, was a cooking teacher, while his father, Eduardo Luis Leavy, was a dentist. His grandfather, Napoleón Leavy, was a national senator during the government of Arturo Frondizi, while his uncle, Luciano Leavy, presided the Salta Chamber of Deputies during the governorship of Bernardino Biella. Leavy has four siblings, one of whom, Eduardo "Chanchín" Leavy, is also active in local Salta politics. Leavy enrolled at the Colegio Militar de la Nación in 1982, but dropped out in 1985. He would later study programming at the Universidad del Salvador, in Buenos Aires, graduating in 1987.

In 1988, he moved to Tartagal, Salta, and set up a timber business. He would eventually become president of the Centro Empresario Maderero, the timber business employers' organisation, in 1992. Leavy is married to Andrea Barbieri, with whom he has two daughters.

== Political career ==
Leavy began his political involvement in the Justicialist Party. In 2003, he ran for a seat in the Chamber of Deputies of Salta for General San Martín Department, in which Tartagal is located. That year, he became a member of the newly founded Victory Party, and in 2006, he was elected as president of the party's Salta chapter. Four years later, in 2007, he ran for the intendencia of Tartagal with support from governor candidate Juan Manuel Urtubey; Leavy won against Salta Renewal Party candidate and incumbent mayor, Darío Valenzuela.

Leavy was re-elected for a second term in 2011, once again facing off Valenzuela. In the 2013 legislative elections, Leavy ran for a seat in the National Chamber of Deputies for the Victory Party, but having received only 7.66% of the vote, he was not elected.

Leavy sought a third term as mayor of Tartagal in 2015, winning in the Victory Party primaries with 42.44% of the votes. He won against the Salta Renewal Party candidate, Gabriela Martinich. In that same election cycle, Leavy ran for a seat in the Parlasur, but lost against former governor Hernán Hipólito Cornejo.

=== National Deputy ===
In the 2017 legislative election, Leavy was the first candidate in the Unidad Ciudadana list to the Chamber of Deputies. In Salta, Unidad Ciudadana (an alliance formed by political groups close to former president Cristina Fernández de Kirchner) ran a separate list from the Justicialist Party. With 22% of the vote and placing third, Leavy earned enough votes to be elected.

Before taking office as deputy, Leavy sought to keep his post as mayor of Tartagal, taking an unpaid leave of office for the remainder of his term as deputy. Although the Tartagal city council approved the move, the opposition Radical Civic Union protested and, in April 2018, Leavy resigned from the position and was replaced by his brother, the president of the city council, Eduardo Leavy.

As deputy, Leavy voted against the 2018 Voluntary Interruption of Pregnancy bill, which would have made abortion legal in Argentina. The bill passed the Chamber of Deputies, but was struck down by the Senate.

=== Gubernatorial campaign and National Senator ===
Two years after being elected as deputy, in 2019, Leavy ran two simultaneous campaigns for two separate posts as part of the Frente de Todos: the governorship of Salta Province, and one of Salta's three seats in the National Senate. For the governorship, Leavy won against former vice governor Miguel Isa in the Frente de Todos primaries, but eventually lost to Gustavo Sáenz of the Salta Identity Party.

In the campaign for the Senate, Leavy was the first candidate in the Frente de Todos list, followed by Nora Giménez. The Frente de Todos list received 46.3% of the vote, and was the most voted in the province: this granted both Leavy and Giménez the two seats for the majority as per the limited voting system employed in the Argentine Senate. He took office on 27 November 2019. His seat in the Chamber of Deputies was occupied by Juan Emilio Ameri, who would resign less than a year later amid a widely publicized sex scandal.

As senator, Leavy forms part of the parliamentary commissions on Administrative and Municipal Affairs, Constitutional Affairs, General Legislation, and Mining, Energy and Fuels. In 2020, he reversed his former position on the issue of abortion and voted in favour of a new Voluntary Interruption of Pregnancy bill, this time legalizing abortion in Argentina.
