= General José de San Martín Department =

General José de San Martín
- Department
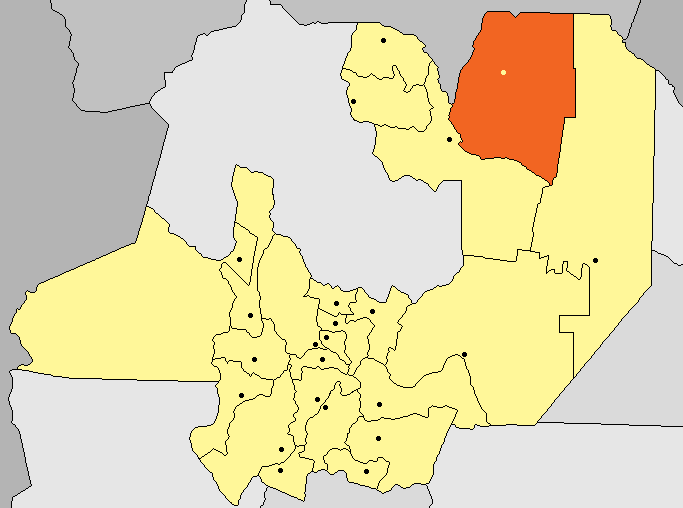
- Coordinates: 22°30′00″S 63°50′00″W
- Country: Argentina
- Province: Salta

Area
  - Total: 16,257 km^{2} (6,277 sq mi)

Population (2010)
  - Total: 156,910
  - Density: 9.6518/km^{2} (24.998/sq mi)

General José de San Martín is a department located in Salta Province, Argentina.

With an area of 16,257 km^{2} (6,277 sq mi) it borders to the north with Bolivia, to the east with Rivadavia, and to the south and west with Orán.

== Towns and municipalities ==
- Aguaray
- Campamento Vespucio
- Embarcación
- General Ballivián
- General Mosconi
- Salvador Mazza
- Tartagal
