= Oscar Alegre =

Argentine footballer

Personal information
- Full name: Oscar Adrián Alegre
- Date of birth: 6 March 1986 (age 40)
- Place of birth: General Ballivián, Argentina
- Height: 1.76 m (5 ft 9 in)
- Position: Forward

Senior career*
Years	Team	Apps	(Gls)
2007–2008	Argentinos Juniors		
2009–2010	Juventud Antoniana		
2011–2012	Bogor Raya		
2012–2013	Ñublense		
2013–2014	Plaza Colonia		
2014	Santos de Guápiles		
2015	Chaco For Ever		
- * Club domestic league appearances and goals as of 25 March 2020

Oscar Adrián Alegre (born March 6, 1986) was an Argentine footballer. He played for Ñublense.
