= Moscone =

Moscone may refer to:

- George Moscone (1929–1978), 37th Mayor of San Francisco, California, 1976–1978
  - Moscone–Milk assassinations, the murders that killed the Mayor and City Supervisor Harvey Milk
  - Moscone Center, a convention center in San Francisco's South of Market district, named for the Mayor
  - Moscone Recreation Center, a park in San Francisco's Marina district, also named for the Mayor
- Jonathan Moscone (born 1964), American theater director

== See also ==
- Yerba Buena/Moscone Station, an underground light rail station of the San Francisco Municipal Railway's Muni Metro system
- Gianni Moscon (born 1994), Italian professional road racing cyclist
- Mosconi (disambiguation)
- Marconi (disambiguation), sometimes confused with Moscone due to its appearance (a reference to Guglielmo Marconi) in Jefferson Starship's 1985 #1 hit song about San Francisco, "We Built This City"
