= Frederick Funston =

19/20th-century United States Army general

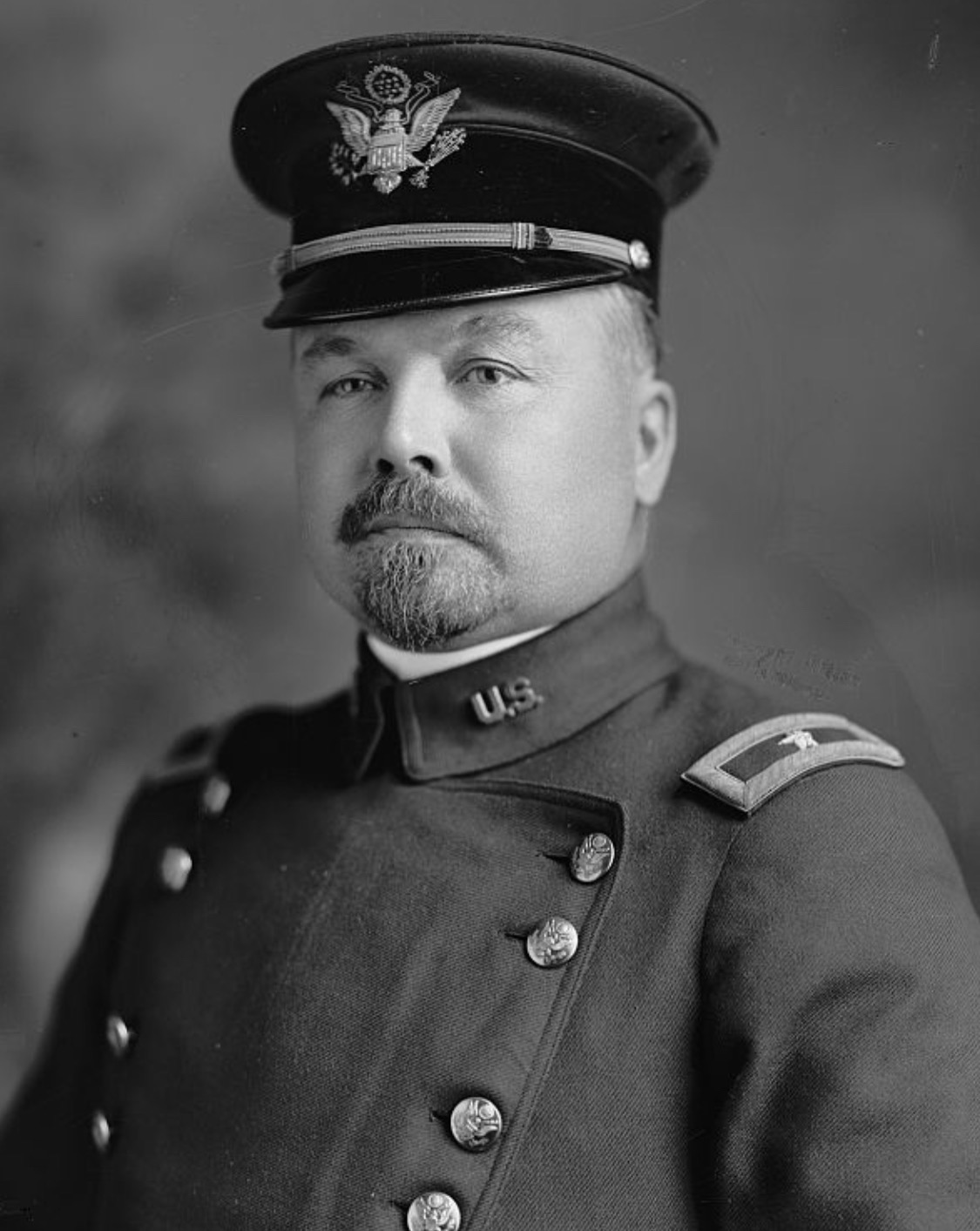
- Funston photographed c. 1910 in the uniform of a brigadier general
- Born: November 9, 1865; New Carlisle, Ohio, U.S.
- Died: February 19, 1917 (aged 51); San Antonio, Texas, U.S.
- Burial place: San Francisco National Cemetery
- Spouse: Eda Blankart Funston (m. 1898)
- Children: Arthur MacArthur Funston; Frederick Funston; Barbara Funston; Eleanor Elizabeth Funston
- Relatives: Edward H. Funston (father); Anne Eliza Mitchell (mother)
- Military career
- Allegiance: Republic of Cuba in Arms (1896–98); United States of America (1898–1917)
- Branch: (Cuba) Cuban Liberation Army; United States Army
- Service years: 1898–1917
- Rank: Major General
- Nickname: "Fearless Freddie"
- Commands: Hawaiian Department
- Conflicts: Cuban War of Independence; Spanish–American War; Philippine–American War; Occupation of Veracruz; Bandit War
- Awards: Medal of Honor

Frederick Funston (November 9, 1865 – February 19, 1917), also known as Fighting Fred Funston, was a general in the United States Army, best known for his roles in the Spanish–American War and the Philippine–American War; he received the Medal of Honor for his actions during the latter conflict.

== Early life, education, and work ==
Funston was born in 1865 in New Carlisle, Ohio, to Edward H. Funston and Anne Eliza Mitchell Funston. In 1867, his family moved to Allen County, Kansas. His father was elected to the United States House of Representatives in 1884 and served five terms.

Funston was a slight individual who stood 5 ft 4 in (1.63 m) tall and weighed 120 pounds (54 kg) when he applied in 1886 to the United States Military Academy; he was rejected. Funston graduated from Iola High School in 1886. He attended the University of Kansas from 1886 to 1890. While there, he joined the Phi Delta Theta fraternity and became friends with William Allen White, who became a writer and won a Pulitzer Prize. He worked as a trainman for the Santa Fe Railroad before becoming a reporter in Kansas City, Missouri, in 1890.

== Career ==
After one year as a journalist, Funston moved into more scientific exploration, focusing primarily on botany. First serving as part of an exploring and surveying expedition in Death Valley, California. In 1891, he then traveled to Alaska to spend the next two years in work for the United States Department of Agriculture.

=== Cuba ===
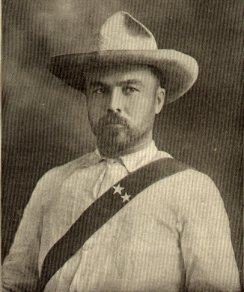
Funston in Cuban uniform

He eventually joined the Cuban Liberation Army that was fighting for independence from Spain in 1896 after having been inspired to join following a rousing speech given by Gen. Daniel E. Sickles at Madison Square Garden in New York City.

After a bout of malaria, Funston's weight dropped to an alarming 95 lb (43 kg). The Cubans gave him a leave of absence. When Funston returned to the United States, he was commissioned as a colonel of the 20th Kansas Infantry Regiment in the United States Army on May 13, 1898, in the early days of the Spanish–American War. In the fall, he met Eda Blankart at a patriotic gathering, and after a brief courtship, they married on October 25, 1898. Within two weeks of the marriage, he had to depart for war, landing in the Philippines as part of the U.S. forces that would become engaged in the Philippine–American War.

=== Philippines ===
Funston was in command in various engagements with Filipino nationalists. In April 1899, he took a Filipino position at Calumpit by swimming the Bagbag River, then crossing the Pampanga River under heavy fire. For his bravery, Funston was soon promoted to the rank of brigadier general of volunteers and awarded the Medal of Honor on February 14, 1900.

Funston played the key role in planning and carrying out the capture of Filipino President Emilio Aguinaldo on March 23, 1901, at Palanan. The capture of Aguinaldo made Funston a national hero in the U.S., although the anti-imperialist movement criticized him when the details of Aguinaldo's capture became known. Funston's party, escorted by a company of Macabebe Scouts, had gained access to Aguinaldo's camp by posing as prisoners. Funston's mission to capture Aguinaldo brought him a Regular Army commission just as he was scheduled to be mustered out of the volunteer service and, at only 35 years old, Funston was appointed a brigadier general in the Regular Army in recognition of his capture of Aguinaldo.

In 1902, Funston returned to the United States to increased public opposition to the Philippine–American War, and became the focus of a great deal of controversy. Mark Twain, a strong opponent of U.S. imperialism, published a sarcasm-filled denunciation of Funston's mission and methods under the title "A Defence of General Funston" in the North American Review. Poet Ernest Crosby also wrote a satirical, anti-imperialist novel, Captain Jinks, Hero, that parodied the career of Funston.

Funston was considered a useful advocate for American expansionism; however, when he publicly made insulting remarks about anti-imperialist Republican Senator George Frisbie Hoar of Massachusetts, mocking his "overheated conscience" in Denver, just prior to a planned visit to Boston, the epicenter of the U.S. anti-imperialism movement, President Theodore Roosevelt denied his furlough request and ordered him to be silenced and officially reprimanded.

=== United States and overseas again ===
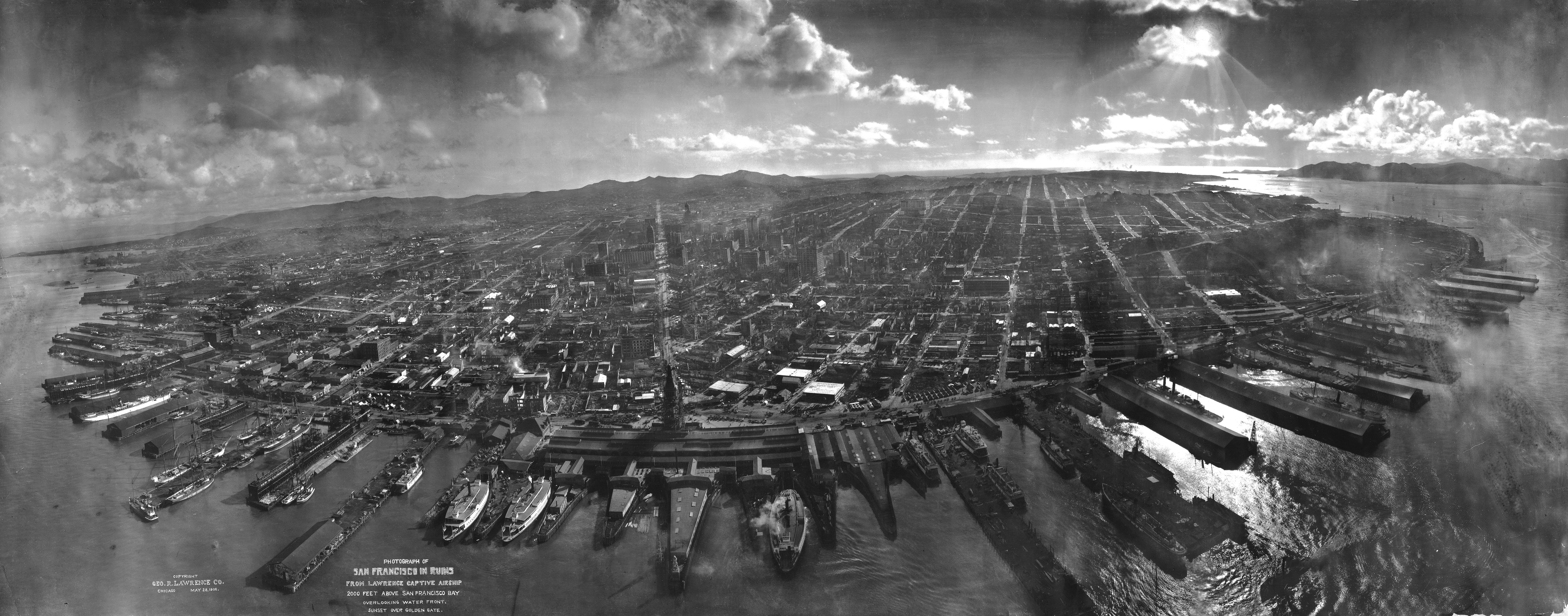
San Francisco, 1906: Aftermath of the fire

In 1906, Funston was commander of the Presidio of San Francisco when the 1906 San Francisco earthquake hit. He declared martial law, although he did not have the authority to do so, and martial law was never officially declared. Funston attempted to defend the city from the spread of fire, and directed the demolition of buildings using explosives to create firebreaks, but his orders often resulted in more fires. Funston gave orders to shoot all looters on sight; however, these orders resulted in numerous cases of innocent people being shot.

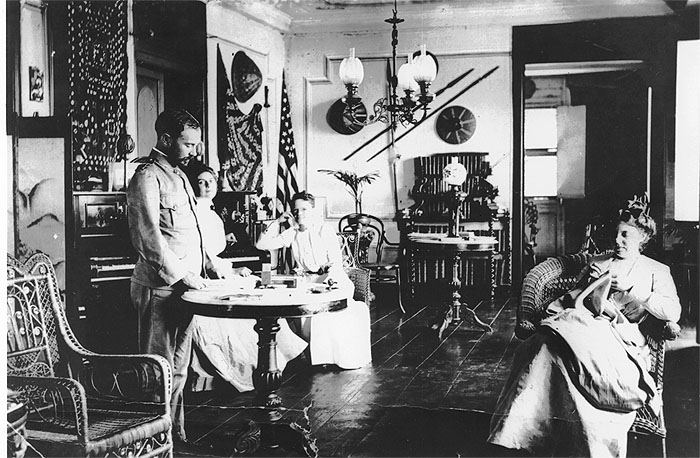
Col. Funston and Eda in their family living room in the Presidio of San Francisco

At the time, local officials praised Funston's actions in the earthquake and fire emergency. Historians have since taken issue with some of his actions in the disaster, arguing that he should not have used military forces in a peacetime emergency.

From December 1907 through March 1908, Funston was in charge of troops at the Goldfield mining center in Esmeralda County, Nevada, where the army put down a labor strike by the Industrial Workers of the World.

After two years as commandant of the Army Service School in Fort Leavenworth, Funston served three years as commander of the Department of Luzon in the Philippines. He was briefly shifted to the same role in the Hawaiian Department (April 3, 1913, to January 22, 1914).

Funston was active in the United States' conflict with Mexico in 1914 to 1916, as commanding general of the army's Southern Department, being promoted to major general in November 1914. He was commander of Fort Sam Houston in San Antonio, Texas, where he prodded Second Lieutenant Dwight Eisenhower into becoming the football coach for the Peacock Military Academy and later approved Eisenhower's request of leave for his wedding. He occupied the city of Veracruz. He commanded all forces involved in the hunt for Pancho Villa, and provided security for the United States border with Mexico during the "Bandit War".

=== World War I and death ===
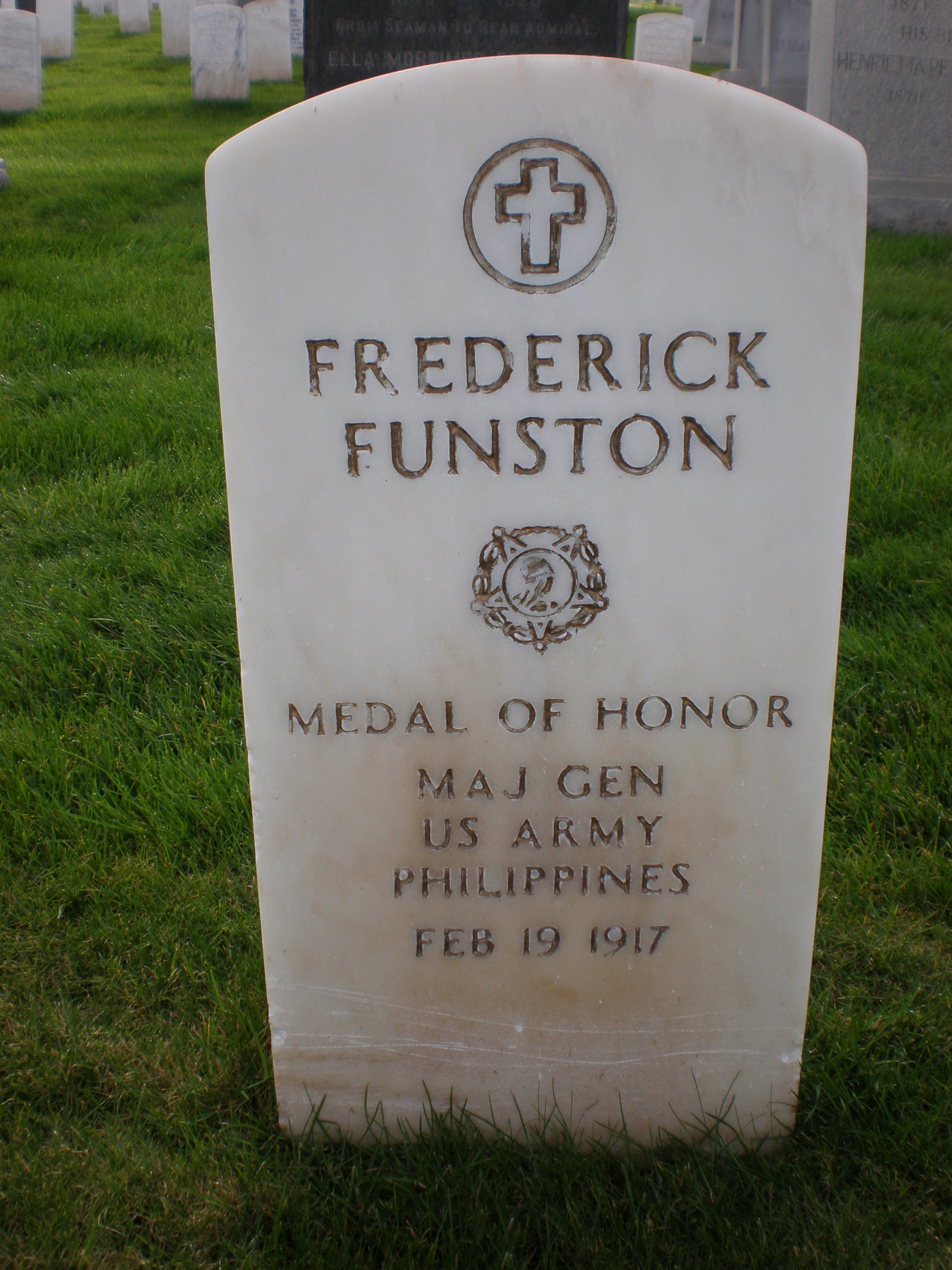
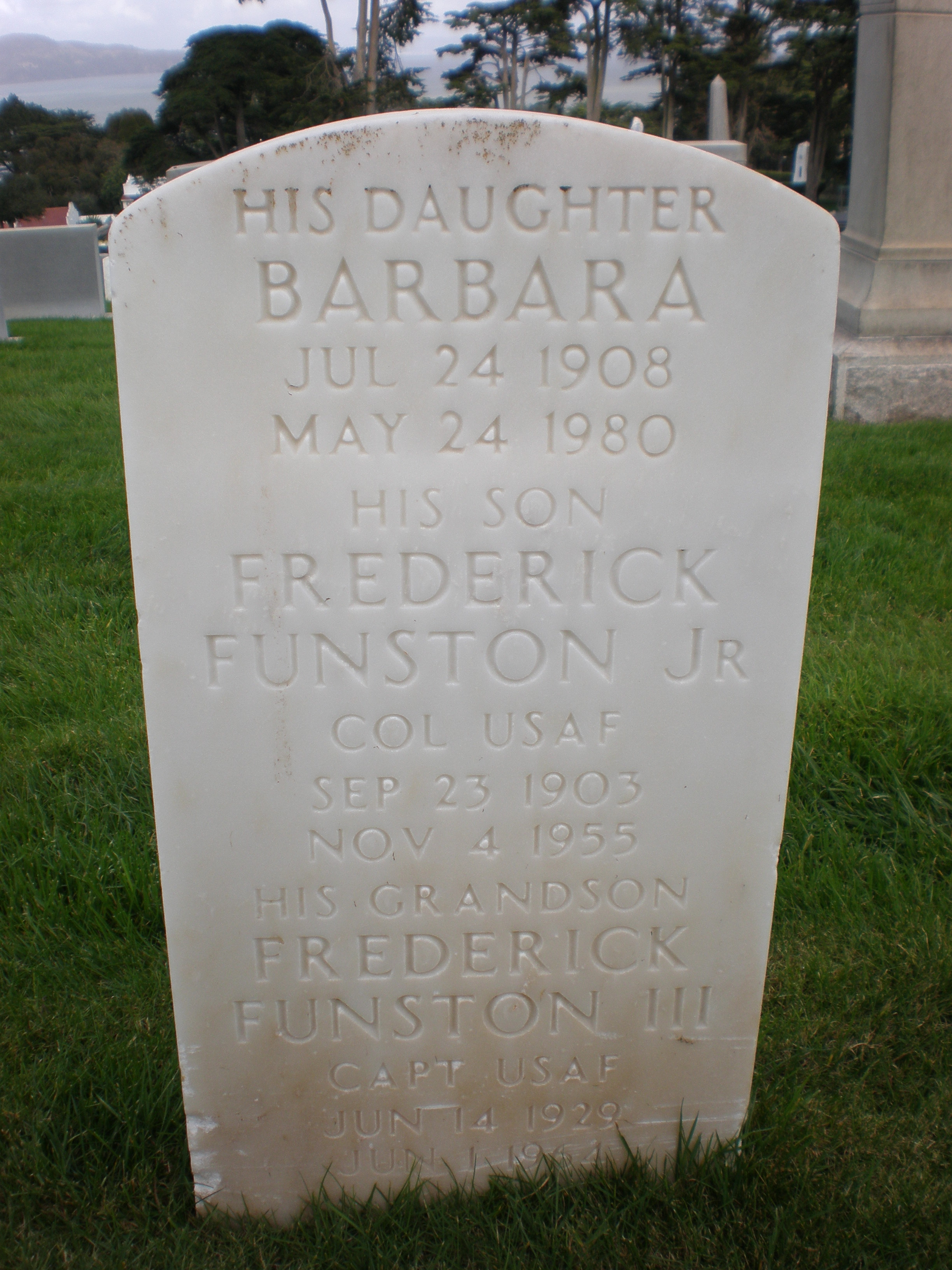
Funston's headstone, front and back

Just prior to the American entry into World War I, in April 1917, President Woodrow Wilson had favored Funston to head any American Expeditionary Force (AEF) that would be sent overseas. Funston's intense focus on his work led to health problems: first, with a case of indigestion in January 1917, followed a month later by a fatal heart attack at the age of 51 in San Antonio, Texas.

In the moments before his death, Funston was relaxing in the lobby of the St. Anthony Hotel in San Antonio, listening to an orchestra play The Blue Danube waltz. After commenting, "How beautiful it all is," he collapsed from a massive heart attack and died. He was holding six-year-old Inez Harriett Silverberg in his arms.

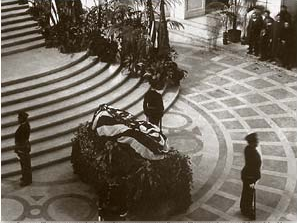
Funston's body lying in state at San Francisco City Hall

Douglas MacArthur, then a major, had the unpleasant duty of breaking the news to President Wilson and Secretary of War Newton D. Baker. As MacArthur explained in his memoirs, "had the voice of doom spoken, the result could not have been different. The silence seemed like that of death itself. You could hear your own breathing."

Funston lay in state at both the Alamo and the City Hall Rotunda in San Francisco. The latter honor gave him the distinction of being the first person to be recognized with this tribute, with his subsequent burial taking place in San Francisco National Cemetery. After his death, the position of AEF commander went to Major General John J. Pershing, who, as commanding general of the Punitive Expedition in 1916, had been Funston's subordinate. The Lake Merced military reservation (part of San Francisco's coastal defenses) was renamed Fort Funston in his honor, while the training camp built in 1917 next to Fort Riley in Kansas (which became the second-largest World War I camp) was named Camp Funston. San Francisco's Funston Park and Funston Avenue are named for him, as is Funston Avenue in his hometown of New Carlisle, Ohio, and Funston Avenue near Fort Sam Houston in San Antonio. In Hawaii, Funston Road at Schofield Barracks and Funston Road at Fort Shafter are named after him. Funston's daughter, and his son and grandson, both of whom served in the United States Air Force, were later interred with him.

== Medal of Honor citation ==
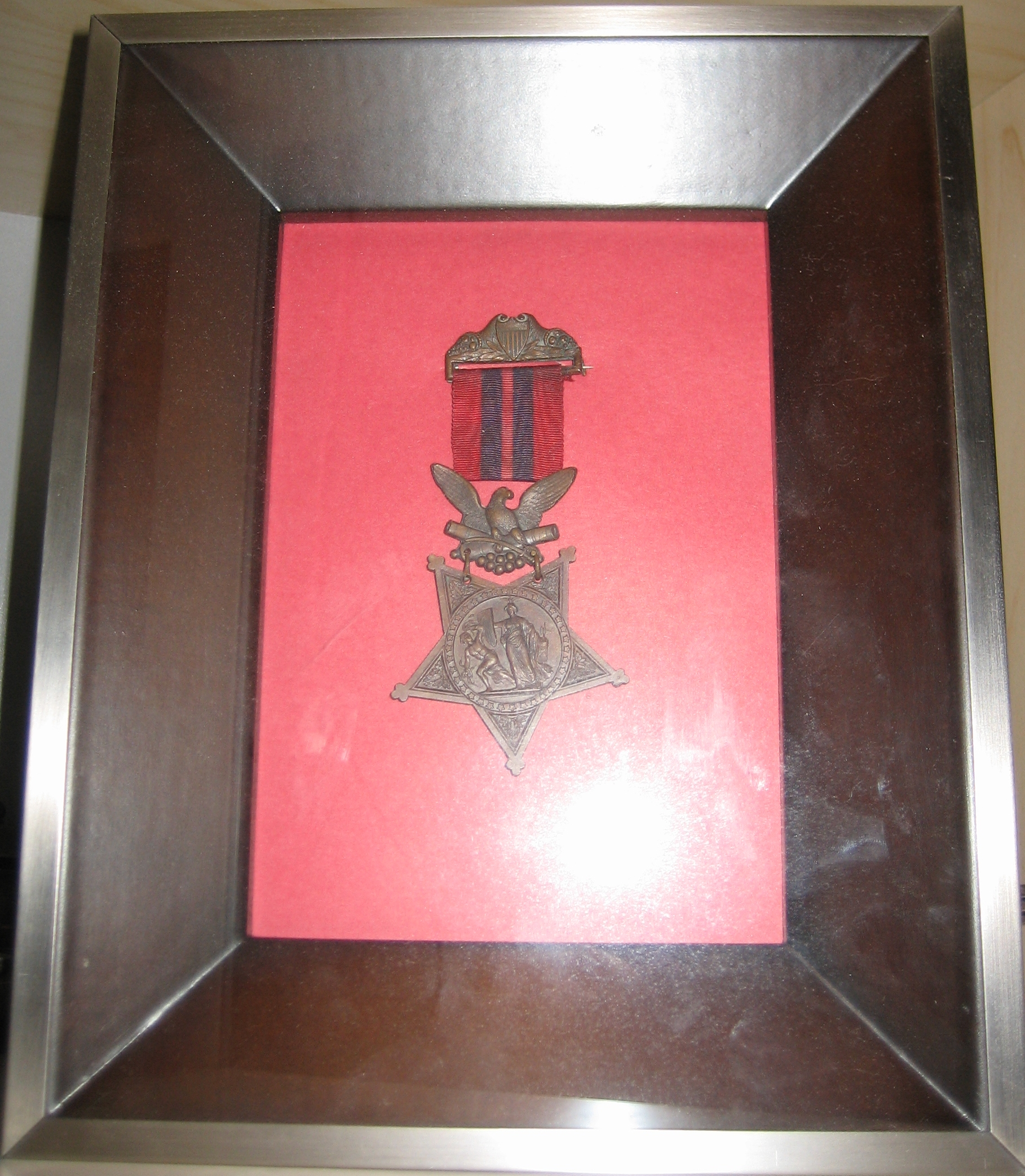
Funston's Medal of Honor

Rank and organization
Colonel, 20th Kansas Volunteer Infantry.
Place and date
At Rio Grande de la Pampanga, Luzon, Philippine Islands, April 27, 1899.
Entered service at
Iola, Kansas.
Birth
New Carlisle, Ohio.
Date of issue
February 14, 1900.
Citation
Crossed the river on a raft and by his skill and daring enabled the general commanding to carry the enemy's entrenched position on the north bank of the river and to drive him with great loss from the important strategic position of Calumpit.

== Legacy ==
Fort Funston in San Francisco, California, is named for him. Streets are named for Funston in San Francisco, New Carlisle, Ohio, Reading, Pennsylvania, Fort Leavenworth, Kansas, Pacific Grove, California, Plano, Texas, and Hollywood, Florida. Part of Fort Riley, Kansas, was also named for him. Frederick Funston Elementary School in Chicago, Illinois is a K-8 Chicago Public School In the Logan Square neighborhood. It is home to the Funston Falcons.

== In popular culture ==
- He was portrayed by Troy Montero in the 2012 Filipino film El Presidente.
- He was portrayed by Pablo Espinosa in the 1997 TNT television series Rough Riders.
- He was mentioned once in The Woggle-Bug Book by L. Frank Baum published in 1905.

== See also ==
- List of Philippine–American War Medal of Honor recipients
- A Defence of General Funston (Mark Twain's satirical essay).

Military offices
Preceded by John Frank Morrison	Commandant of the Command and General Staff College; January 1911 – February 1913	Succeeded by Ramsay D. Potts
