= María Casanova de Chaudet =

Argentine geologist, chemist and petrographer (1899–1947)

- Born: María Casanova; 26 November 1899; Rome, Italy
- Died: 8 November 1947 (aged 47); Buenos Aires, Argentina
- Education: Royal University of Rome
- Occupations: Geologist, chemist, petrographer
- Spouse: Augusto Chaudet

María Casanova de Chaudet, also known by her birth name María Casanova, (1899–1947) was an Italian-born Argentine geologist, chemist and petrographer who was invited to organize and direct Argentina's first petrographic laboratory for Yacimientos Petrolíferos Fiscales (YPF) in 1928.

== Biography ==
María Casanova was born in Rome, Italy, on 26 November 1899, to Emilia Stella and Ángelo Casanova. She attended the city's Classical Lyceum for her secondary school education and on 28 July 1920, she graduated with her PhD in chemistry from the Royal University of Rome (now Sapienza University of Rome) at the age of 20, with a score of 102 out of 110. Later, she completed additional training, including work at the petrographic laboratory of the Royal Geological Office (now called the Geological Survey of Italy).

=== Years in Argentina ===
Former logo of Argentine State-owned oil company "Yacimientos Petrolíferos Fiscales" (YPF). (1940s–1991)

She was invited by Guido de Bonarelli to work in Argentina at the Yacimientos Petrolíferos Fiscales (State Oil Fields) in the late 1920s. She arrived on the steamship "Augusto" on 27 January 1928 and was directed to organize Argentina's first petrographic laboratory. Her initial three-year contract indicates that she requested a three-month unpaid leave of absence to visit her parents in Italy.

Casanova became identified with geologists Egidio Feruglio, Danilo Ramaccioni, Ivo Conci, and Enrique Fossa Mancini, as the "Italian school of the YPF." Many of them, including Casanova, later taught at the Petroleum Institute of the University of Buenos Aires.

Casanova's work included studying samples from exploratory wells in Comodoro Rivadavia (Chubut) and Campamento Vespucio (Salta). A 1927 report from the administrator of the Comodoro Rivadavia oil field, confirms Casanova's arrival saying that she was hired for her professional skills, but notes her gender, “At the suggestion of geologist Dr. Fossa Mancini, we have hired two new geologists and a petrographer [Casanova] (the latter, fortunately, according to the recommender, is unattractive enough to work at the oil field without major inconveniences)."

She taught Laboratory Practices at the Petroleum Institute and explained in her 1934 publication the tasks and organization of the YPF Petrographic Laboratory, also indicating the personnel under her supervision and the available equipment. As director, she assisted research supervisors of young Argentine geologists, including Jova Clara Yussen de Campana whose thesis was titled "Petrographic Study of Some Oil Wells in Plaza Huincul, Neuquén" in 1931.

During the years of World War II, Argentina was experiencing coal shortages, so Casanova worked with professionals from YPF's Exploration Division to find and exploit new ways to harvest Argentina's asphaltite and coal resources. She published her resulting research in the July 1942 issue of the Petroleum Information Bulletin.

In 1945, the Argentine Geological Society was founded by a group that included Casanova and eight other women among the other 92 male members.

=== Personal life ===
On 8 January 1936, she married Augusto Chaudet, also a Doctor of Chemistry. After that, she used her new longer name on her reports, appearing thereafter as María Casanova de Chaudet.

She died at 47 on 8 November 1947 in Buenos Aires.

== Selected publications ==
- Casanova, M. 1930a. Intercalaciones de capas de origen marino en el Chubutiano del subsuelo de Comodoro Rivadavia. Boletín de Informaciones Petroleras, año 7(74): 933–937.
- Casanova, M. 1930b. Sobre el significado de los gránulos y cristales dolomíticos, sideríticos y ankeríticos, observados en areniscas y arcillas de las formaciones petrolífera de Comodoro Rivadavia y Campamento Vespucio. Boletín de Informaciones Petroleras, año 7 (76): 1109–1115.
- Casanova, M. 1930c. Sobre la desaparición de los gránulos de carbonato (ankeríticos) enla proximidad de las capas petrolíferas del Campamento Vespucio. Boletín de Informaciones Petroleras, año 7 (76): 1117–1119.
- Casanova, M. 1931. Apuntes petrográficos sobre los terrenos atravesados por los pozos de Comodoro Rivadavia y sus alrededores. Contribuciones a la Primera Reunión de Geografía Yacimientos Petrolíferos Fiscales, 40 pp., Buenos Aires.
- Casanova, M. 1934. Las tareas y la organización del laboratorio petrográfico de YPF. Boletín de Informaciones Petroleras, año 11 (115): 41–71
- Casanova de Chaudet, María, Campamento Tupungato, and Bol Inform Petrol Buenos Aires. "South America." Handbook of World Salt Resources (2012): 150.
