= Recaredo, Salta =

Recaredo
- Municipality and village
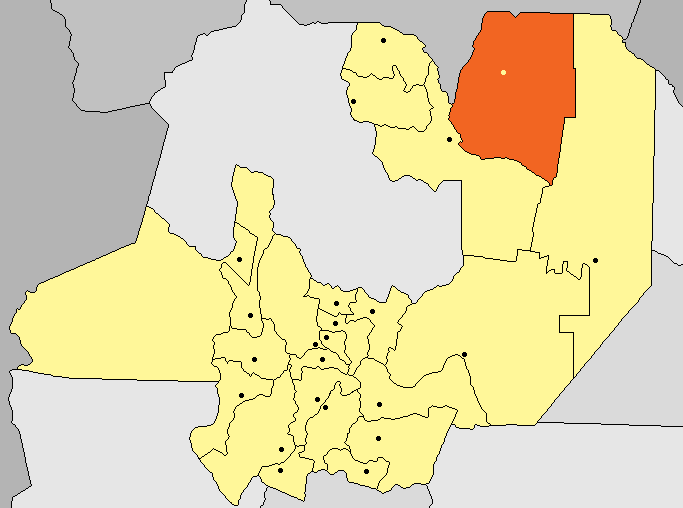
- Departamento General José de San Martín
- Coordinates: 25°15′S 63°21′W
- Country: Argentina
- Province: Salta Province
- Elevation: 735 ft (224 m)

Population (2001)
  - Total: 100
- Time zone: UTC−3 (ART)
- Postal code: 4563

Recaredo is a village and rural municipality in Salta Province in northwestern Argentina. It is near General Mosconi, Salta, and its population relies on local petroleum extraction.
