= Tartagal Airport =

Airport in Argentina

Tartagal Airport General Enrique Mosconi Airport
- IATA: TTG; ICAO: SAST

Summary
- Airport type: Public
- Serves: Tartagal, Argentina
- Location: General Mosconi
- Elevation AMSL: 1,473 ft / 449 m
- Coordinates: 22°37′10″S 63°47′36″W

Map
- Location of the airport in Argentina

Runways
Direction	Length		Surface
Direction	m	ft	Surface
02/20	2,500	8,202	Asphalt
- Sources: SkyVector WAD Google Maps

Tartagal Airport – General Enrique Mosconi (Spanish: Aeropuerto de Tartagal – Gral. Enrique Mosconi) (IATA: TTG, ICAO: SAST) is an airport serving Tartagal, a city in the Salta Province of Argentina. It is located 2 kilometres (1 mi) from the town of General Mosconi, and 9 kilometres (5.6 mi) south of Tartagal. The airport was named after the Argentine military engineer Enrique Mosconi.

The runway length includes a 260 metres (850 ft) displaced threshold on Runway 20. The Tartagal non-directional beacon (Ident: TAR) is located 1.5 nautical miles (3 km) west-southwest of the airport.

== See also ==
- Transport in Argentina
- List of airports in Argentina
