= Fundación Impulsar =

Argentine foundation

The Fundación Impulsar (Impulsar Foundation) is the Argentine affiliation of the King's Trust. It was founded in 1999 in Salta in the north west of Argentina, when seven British businesses working in Argentina (including Unilever, British Gas, and Rio Tinto Borax), inspired by the work of the Prince's Trust, agreed to fund a similar initiative. The following year, in response to the demand for help to establish similar organisations in various countries around the world, the then-Prince's Trust established YBI (Youth Business International), an umbrella organisation to advise and certify these organisations in the different countries. The Fundación Impulsar became an accredited member of YBI in 2002.

== Background ==
The Fundación Impulsar helps entrepreneurial minded young people aged between eighteen and thirty-five years old who have a good idea for a business. It focusses particularly on those from economically disadvantaged backgrounds, who would not be able to find funding elsewhere. Along with seed capital, the Fundación Impulsar also provides business planning and development support and mentoring to the start ups that it helps.

The Fundación Impulsar advertises its services in the media, and then interviews the applicants that respond to the adverts, to get to know them and to discuss their ideas. If their business seems viable, the Fundación Impulsar sends the potential entrepreneurs on a course to help them write a business plan. If the plan still portrays a feasible, sustainable business, they sign a contract and the funding and mentoring begin. The funding is in the form of a loan that is typically repaid over the course of three years.

Since its founding in Salta, eight other branches of the Fundación Impulsar have been established throughout the country, in Tartagal, Tucuman, Mendoza, Cordoba, Missiones, San Luis, Puerto San Julian and in Buenos Aires. Over time, the Buenos Aires office has become the head office, a logical step with the capital the undisputed transport and communications hub of the country. The original Salta office continues to play a central role though, training staff in the other offices as well as in similar organisations that have since been established in other countries throughout Latin America.

To date, the Fundación Impulsar has helped over one thousand people start businesses in Argentina, of which seventy percent are still trading after three years. On average, each business now employs two point five people.

Each year, Youth Business International, which has member organisations in thirty-four countries, holds the Entrepreneur of the Year awards to recognise the best and most innovative new businesses founded that year throughout the world. The 2009 Entrepreneur of the Year was the Argentine Juan Ramón Nuñez, who with the support of the Fundación Impulsar set up a community radio station alongside a sound and lighting rental business in a deprived suburb of Buenos Aires.

The president of the Salta office, Ramiro Cornejo Torino, says: “You plant a seed, you nurture it, and you wait to see how far it will grow”. One project funded by the Salta office, a leather workshop, now supplies luxury leather goods to Casa Lopez, a leading Argentine fashion chain, as well as to Estados, a small British company that sells a range of exclusive handmade leather goods in the UK.
