= Enrique Mosconi =

Argentine military engineer

General Enrique Mosconi
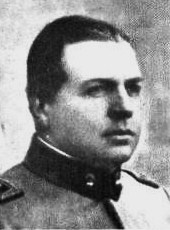
- Enrique Mosconi, c. 1915

Director of Yacimientos Petrolíferos Fiscales
- In office 1922–1930

Personal details
- Born: Enrique Carlos Alberto Mosconi Canavery; 21 February 1877 Buenos Aires, Argentina
- Died: 4 June 1940 (aged 63) Buenos Aires, Argentina
- Resting place: La Recoleta Cemetery
- Occupation: Army administration
- Profession: military engineer
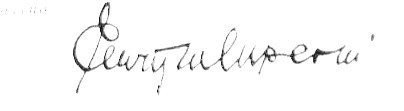
- Signature

Military service
- Allegiance: Argentina
- Branch/service: Argentine Army; German Army (1906-1908)
- Years of service: 1894-1922
- Rank: General

Enrique Carlos Alberto Mosconi (21 February 1877 – 4 June 1940) was an Argentine military engineer, who is best known as the pioneer and organizer of petroleum exploration and extraction in Argentina.

== Early life ==
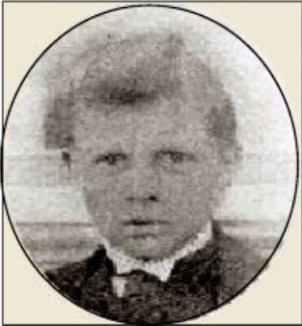
Portrait of Mosconi in his childhood, 1884

Mosconi was born in Buenos Aires to Enrico Mosconi, an Italian engineer hired to build railways, and María Juana Canavery, an Argentine of Irish descent. Enrico Mosconi founded the town of Villa Gobernador Gálvez on 26 February 1888. Enrico Mosconi wanted a son to be a doctor; his mother wanted her son to follow the family military tradition of Ángel Canavery, his uncle, who had taken part in the Conquest of the Desert. Mosconi had two older sisters and two younger brothers. Being only two years old the family moved to Italy, coming back a few years later after the death of Mosconi's mother. Enrico Mosconi remarried to Countess Maria Luisa Natti.

The Mosconi Canavery's were linked to aristocratic families of Buenos Aires, including the families of Bartolomé Mitre, Carlos Pellegrini and Juan José Alsina, godfather of General Mosconi. He was a friend of Jorge Newbery, a pioneer of Argentine aviation of American descent.

All his maternal ancestors took an active part in the defence and reconquest of Buenos Aires during the English Invasions. His great-grandfather was Juan Canaverys, a colonial official who attended the Cabildo Abierto of May 22, 1810. His uncle Tomás Canavery, was a prominent parish priest who served during the Triple Alliance War. His maternal ancestors also were linked to Juan Miguel de Esparza, distinguished military and politician who served during the colonial period, linked in turn with Amador Vaz de Alpoim and Margarida Cabral de Melo, belonging to noble Azorean families.

Through the Garrido family, Enrique Mosconi traces an illustrious connection with Luis Vernet, Argentine governor of the Islas Malvinas, between 1829 and 1832.

== Early studies ==
When he finished primary school, young Mosconi entered the Military College of the Nation on 26 May 1891, and graduated from it as an infantry sub-lieutenant on 20 November 1894, at 17 years of age. He was assigned to take charge of the 7th Infantry Regiment in Río Cuarto, Córdoba, and he began writing a "Rulebook for Campaign Infantry", with details on the handling of explosives and instructions to build bridges. In 1896 he was promoted and transferred to Buenos Aires, where he started the Engineering career.

In 1899 he performed topographical and statistical surveys of the Andes in the province of Mendoza, and the next year he took part in the studies in Patagonia to establish a strategically important railroad system in Neuquén.

In 1901 he graduated from the School of Physical and Natural Sciences of the University of Buenos Aires as a civil engineer. His doctoral thesis dealt with a project to dam the Nahuel Huapi Lake and installing a valve to regulate the flow of the Limay River and the Río Negro, in Neuquén, in order to make them navigable.

== Military career ==
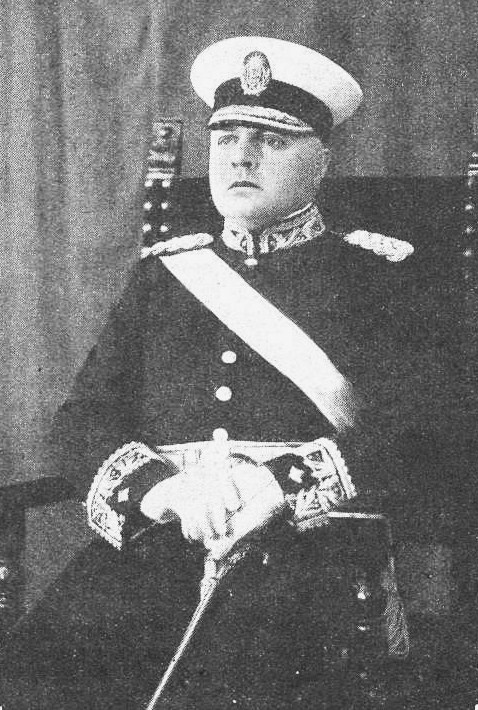
Mosconi, dressing in military uniform

In 1903 he was transferred to the Engineering division of the Army as a military engineer, and in 1904 he received a prize for a construction project. Between 1906 and 1908 he was part of commission of Argentine graduate students sent to Europe (Italy, Belgium and Germany) to study and acquire hydroelectric and gas power plants. He was assigned to the German Army engineering corps, and spent four years embedded in the 10th Battalion of Westphalia, while in postgraduate studies at the Artillery and Engineering Superior Technical School of Charlottenburg. In Germany he became acquainted with the ideas of Friedrich List (1789–1846), an economist whose industrialist ideas had great influence in Europe and the United States.

In 1909 Mosconi returned to Argentina as Chief of the 2nd Engineers Battalion, stays a few months and then travels to Europe again in order to acquire materials for the Engineering division. There he studies and works in telegraphists and railway specialists units in Germany, France and Austria-Hungary. He came back to Argentina in December 1914, and re-took his post as the chief of the Engineering Regiment until 1915, when he was appointed director of the Esteban de Luca Arsenal. In 1920 he was moved the Aeronautics division, which he directed until 1922.

== YPF and the nationalization of oil ==
On 16 October 1922 Mosconi was appointed by the president Alvear as Director-General of the Fiscal Petroleum Reserves (Yacimientos Petrolíferos Fiscales, YPF), where he would stay for eight years, devoting large efforts to increase exploration and development of petroleum extraction.

YPF received an initial grant of 8 million Argentine pesos by the national government, and from then on became self-sufficient, financing itself with the profits of extraction and, of course, without foreign investment or loans. In 1925 Mosconi considered the possibility of a state-private society, but in 1928 he turned back on his proposal and further stated:

"There is no other way but the monopoly of the State in a wholesale fashion, that is, in all activities of this industry: production, elaboration, transport and trade... Without an oil monopoly it is difficult... it is impossible for a State company to defeat private capital organizations."

He also remarked that, in order to defend Argentine fiscal oil reserves from the foreign companies, there was the need of "a magnificent insensitivity to all demands on the part of private interests, either in accord or not with the collective interests, but even more, what is needed is a political power capable of containing all opposing forces". Some of the nationalistic policies of Venezuelan President Hugo Chávez have been marked as a continuation of this doctrine.

He created in 1927 the Alianza Continental (Continental Alliance) advocating economical independence for Latin American states, an association gathering mainly students and intellectuals, and focusing in particular on oil policies. Between 1927 and 1928 Mosconi toured Latin America telling and teaching the authorities about the Argentine experience with regards to fossil fuels, campaigning for an integration of efforts in the matter of petroleum as a resource. Mosconi was the major proponent of a national policy that put natural resources at the service of economic, industrial and social development of the nation. He defended nationalization of these resources, an absolute fiscal monopoly on surveyance and exploitation, the need for Latin American countries to agree on common actions in this matter, and the passing of resource-related legislation that was advantageous to the interests of the national states. During this trip, Mosconi met with Lázaro Cárdenas, who would nationalize oil in Mexico ten years later, and General Elías Plutarco. The influence of these doctrines reached Mexico, Brazil, Uruguay, Bolivia and Colombia.

Mosconi managed YPF efficiently and, while establishing a soon-to-be major oil company, starts fighting the political pressure of two giants of hydrocarbon exploitation: the British-Dutch Royal Dutch, and John D. Rockefellers' Standard Oil.

In 1929 Mosconi received Edmundo Castillo, Uruguay's Minister of Industry, and counseled him about the establishment of a national refinery and a state corporation to sell its products. This led to the creation of ANCAP (Administración Nacional de Combustibles, Alcohol y Portland), the state energy corporation created by the Uruguayan government in 1931.

In 1936, after the Chaco War, the state of Bolivia created Yacimientos Petrolíferos Fiscales Bolivianos (YPFB) after the model of the Argentine company, and soon afterward it dictated the expropriation of the Bolivian Standard Oil Company.

In 1938 the same ideas led to the Conselho Nacional do Petróleo (CNP). That year Mosconi was awarded a medal by the Academy of Science and Art of Rio de Janeiro, in recognition for his work.

== Mosconi today ==
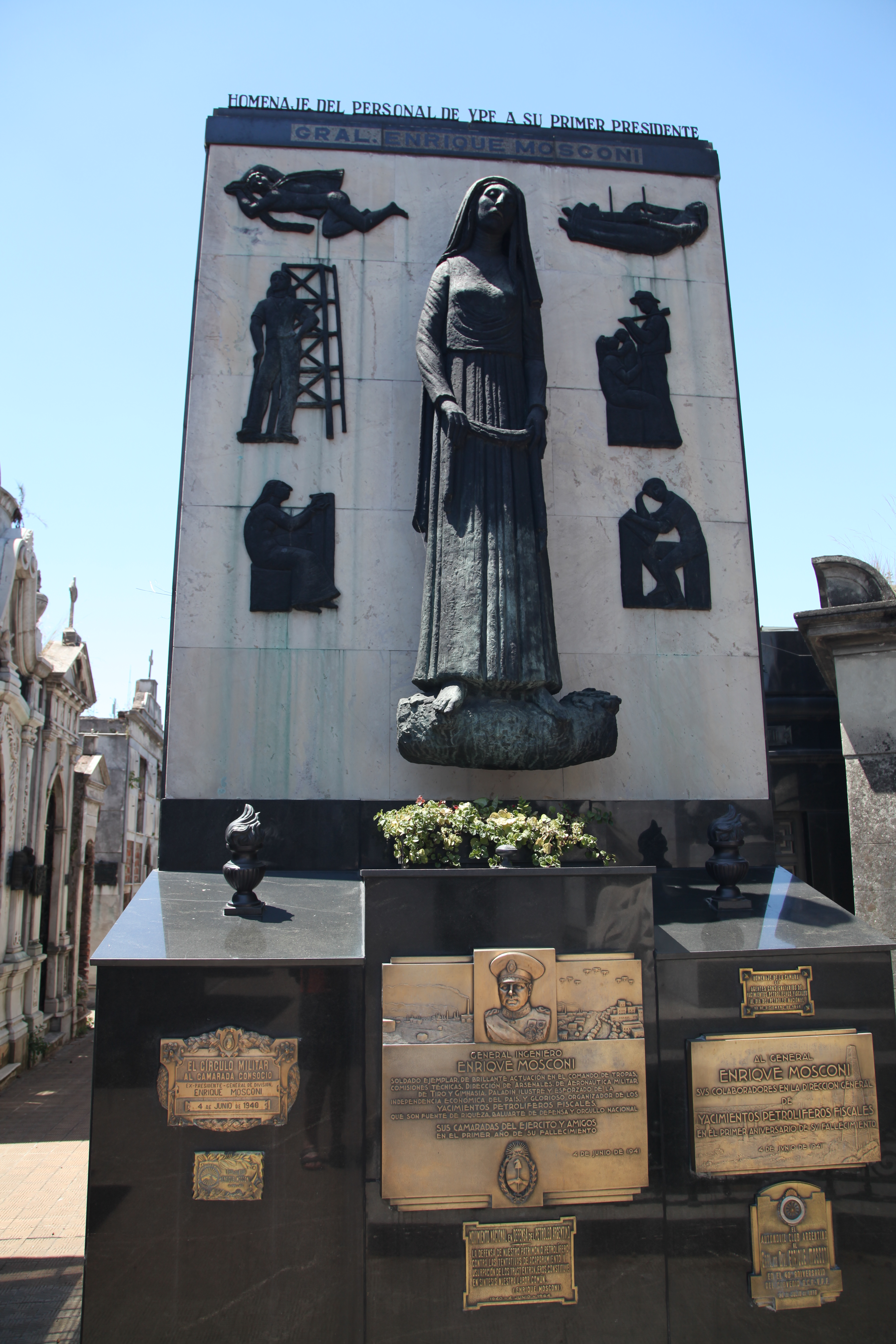
Tomb of Enrique Mosconi in La Recoleta Cemetery

Though Mosconi's ideas about energy independence did not survive long, YPF stood as Argentina's state oil company until 1999, when it was privatized by order of President Carlos Menem.

A town in Salta, is named General Enrique Mosconi, as well as a nearby airport south of Tartagal. This town became known in the Argentine national stage in 2001 due to a serious conflict between the government and groups of piqueteros, workers left unemployed in part by the downsizing of oil exploitation in the area after the privatization of YPF.

In 1983 the "General Mosconi" Argentine Institute of Energy was founded. It is a non-profit organization devoted "to promote a rational exploitation of energy resources and developing its related activities for the good interests of the population".

In the city of Comodoro Rivadavia, Chubut, there is a neighbourhood and an international airport that are named after the engineer.

== Sources ==
- Historia de los Yacimientos Petrolíferos Fiscales: Biografía de Mosconi (in Spanish)
- Publicly accessible email message, citing another (unspecified) webpage. Lista de correo electrónico Reconquista-Popular (email list information, in Spanish). Retrieved from http://archives.econ.utah.edu/archives/reconquista-popular/2004w31/msg00079.htm at 16:50, 17 September 2005 (UTC).
- Short biography (in Spanish).
