= One Tail at a Time =

Non-profit in Chicago

- Abbreviation: OTAT
- Formation: 2015
- Type: Non-profit
- Legal status: 501(c)(3)
- Headquarters: 2144 N Wood St, Chicago, IL 60614
- Region served: Cook County
- Executive Director: Heather Owen
- Main organ: Board President
- Website: https://www.onetail.org/

One Tail at a Time (OTAT) is a Chicago non-profit organization that rescues and shelters homeless dogs from overpopulated shelters and provides resources and future adoption opportunities for the rescued animals. The shelter's purpose is to treat sick and injured animals from local city shelters before entering an adoption program. OTAT uses a progressive dog adoption program that supports under-resourced animal shelters and pet families. The original adoption center, located in Bucktown, houses homeless dogs available for adoption. OTAT has a second location in Logan Square that serves as an isolation center that treats highly emotionally damaged dogs that need extra care and attention. OTAT's mission is to end pet homelessness and make pet ownership a pleasurable and accessible experience.

== History ==
Operating since 2008, OTAT opened its adoption center in 2015 in the neighborhood of Bucktown. In 2018, Heather Owen, the executive director, attempted to open a new center at 3579 W. Dickens Ave, in Humboldt Park. The purpose of the new building was to provide an isolation center for dogs in need of treatment. The building was subject to a zoning change that required 26th Ward Alderman Roberto Maldonado’s approval before it could be sold. In order to get the zoning change approved, OTAT worked with a zoning attorney and Alderman Maldonado required OTAT to gather signatures from all nearby residences, including the adjacent school, Funston Elementary. OTAT met the requirements, but OTAT was not approved for the zoning change, so they could not purchase the building.

Afterwards, the office of Mayor Rahm Emanuel aided OTAT in finding a new building. OTAT tried to buy a city building in Logan Square at 2460 W. Cortland St. The building is within the restriction of 1st Ward Alderman Daniel La Spata, and was also under a zoning change that required his approval. A town hall meeting was planned to be held for the community to share their feedback with Alderman La Spata before he made a decision about the zoning change. The building's inspection didn't go well, and OTAT was not allowed to buy the building; consequently prompting the town hall meeting cancellation. In summer 2019, OTAT got a second location in Logan Square.

In October 2019, they posted pictures for adoption of a dog named Parmesan that was covered with scabs on her face and had swollen paws. The pictures on social media helped raise $12,000 for her medical bills, and the remainder of the money will be used for other homeless dogs at OTAT shelters.

== Programs ==
In June 2019, OTAT launched a two-phase program called One Tail Cooperative that dedicated to maximizing lifesaving efforts to many rescued dogs in the Chicago area.

The first phase includes the opening of OTAT's behavior and training center. This allowed dogs in need of physical and emotional assistance, to get the help they require to get them ready for adoption. This first phase also involves the MOTAT (Mobile OTAT) initiative, which is an adoption truck that goes to places where pet adoption hasn't been available due to the lack of shelters.

The second phase involves the opening of a permanent isolation center for sick dogs. This includes a veterinary clinic, so that necessary care can be provided to all the dogs before getting them ready for adoption. OTAT is also very active on numerous social media sites and have used that platform in the past to raise and collect donations for dogs that are in need of veterinary care.

== Events ==
Since 2008, OTAT has been part of many dog centered events in Chicago. Some events include several year-around 'doggie' centered events in Chicago.

In 2015, the organization hosted its 2nd annual “Chicago Dog Restaurant Week”. This event consisted of participating restaurants that donated a percentage of sales to benefit OTAT. The restaurants that participated during the year were: Upton's Breakroom, Native Foods, Wishbone West Loop, Old Town Social, Reno, and Wyler Road.

In 2018, OTAT partnered up with Emporium Pop-Ups to bring to life a Pop-Up Dog Bar on Milwaukee Avenue, outside of Emporium Arcade Bar. The first-ever dog Pop-Up Bar in Chicago was sponsored by local brands such as Few Spirits, as well as other branermans from out of state like New Belgium Brewing from Colorado. The 10th annual Houndstooth Ball charity event that supported OTAT in December 2018 raised over $165,000.

During August 2019, One Tail Cooperative held their "Summer Shake” event in Rogers Park, which involved a silent auction, a raffle, and tons of fun activities for dog lovers and their pets. During the same month, OTAT collaborated with The Talbott Hotel in order to hold its 5th annual dog fashion show and pet adoption event to benefit OTAT.

In November 2019, OTAT partnered with a local dog-friendly brewery called Midwest Coast Brewing to hold an adoption event there. Additionally, NBC Sports Chicago drafted a dog onto their team, Walter, a twelve-week-old dachshund, for a segment called “Puppy pick-em.” Walters's job is to pick the football games throughout the 2019-2020 NFL season.

In 2019, after Hurricane Dorian, OTAT went to the Bahamas to rescue the abandoned and homeless dogs that endured the hurricane.
