= A Defence of General Funston =

Satirical piece written by Mark Twain

"A Defence of General Funston" is a satirical piece written by Mark Twain lampooning US Army General and expansionism advocate Frederick Funston. Funston had been a colonel during the Spanish–American and Philippine–American Wars, and Twain had been an outspoken critic of these wars, as immoral ventures of the American state into the imperialist subjugation of foreign peoples and territories.

== Plot ==
In the piece, Twain essentially excoriates Funston as a scoundrel for the tactics he employed in capturing the Filipino president Emilio Aguinaldo, while at the same time facetiously arguing that Funston is not responsible for any of his actions since it was not Funston himself but his "inborn disposition" that determined his actions for him. As this is the only ground upon which Twain makes his "defence", the overall effect is to ironically and comically emphasize Twain's view that Funston's actions were completely indefensible.

== Reception ==
According to a research article, Mark Twain used this book, as well as an essay in the North American Review to criticize Funston creating a controversy which lasted for months. The controversy was covered by many American papers, destroying the reputation of Funston. According to a website, the essay was a "searing satire of Funston's methods in capturing Aguinaldo and the hero's welcome he received after returning to the United States."
