= Kenneth W. Course =

American politician

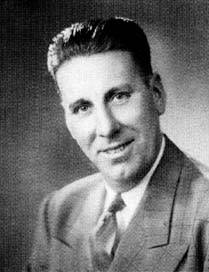

Member of the Illinois Senate
- In office 1971–1977
- Preceded by: Albert E. Bennett
- Succeeded by: Richard S. Clewis
- Constituency: 14th district (1971–73); 17th district (1973–77)

Member of the Illinois House of Representatives
- In office 1957–1971

Personal details
- Born: Chicago, Illinois
- Died: 1977
- Party: Democratic
- Education: DePaul University

Kenneth W. Course (died 1977) was an American Democratic politician who served in the Illinois House of Representatives and the Illinois Senate.

== Early life and career ==
Course was born in Chicago. He attended Funston Elementary School, Roosevelt High School, and DePaul University, and received coaching for the Certified Public Accountant examination through LaSalle Extension University.

During World War II, Course served for four years in the United States Army with the 101st Airborne Division. He saw action in four major battles, including the Battle of the Bulge, as a forward observer with airborne artillery. Before his election to the General Assembly, he worked for more than 25 years in the wholesale and retail oil business.

== Political career ==
Course served in the Illinois House during the 70th through 76th General Assemblies. He was elected to the Illinois Senate in 1970 and reelected in 1972. While serving in the Senate, he also worked as the manager of Merrill C. Meigs Field. In 1975, he chaired the Senate Revenue Committee and served on the Transportation Committee.

== Cement bribery case ==
Course was prosecuted in connection with a scheme involving legislation to increase the legal weight limit for ready-mix concrete trucks. On June 25, 1976, a federal jury convicted him of conspiracy and mail fraud, as well as bribery. He was sentenced to three years in prison and fined $5,000.
