= Villa Gobernador Gálvez =

City in Argentina

- City
- Location of Villa Gobernador Gálvez in Argentina
- Coordinates: 33°01′32″S 60°38′01″W
- Country: Argentina
- Province: Santa Fe
- Department: Rosario

Population (2001 census)
  - Total: 74,509
- Time zone: UTC−3 (ART)
- CPA base: S2124
- Dialing code: +54 341

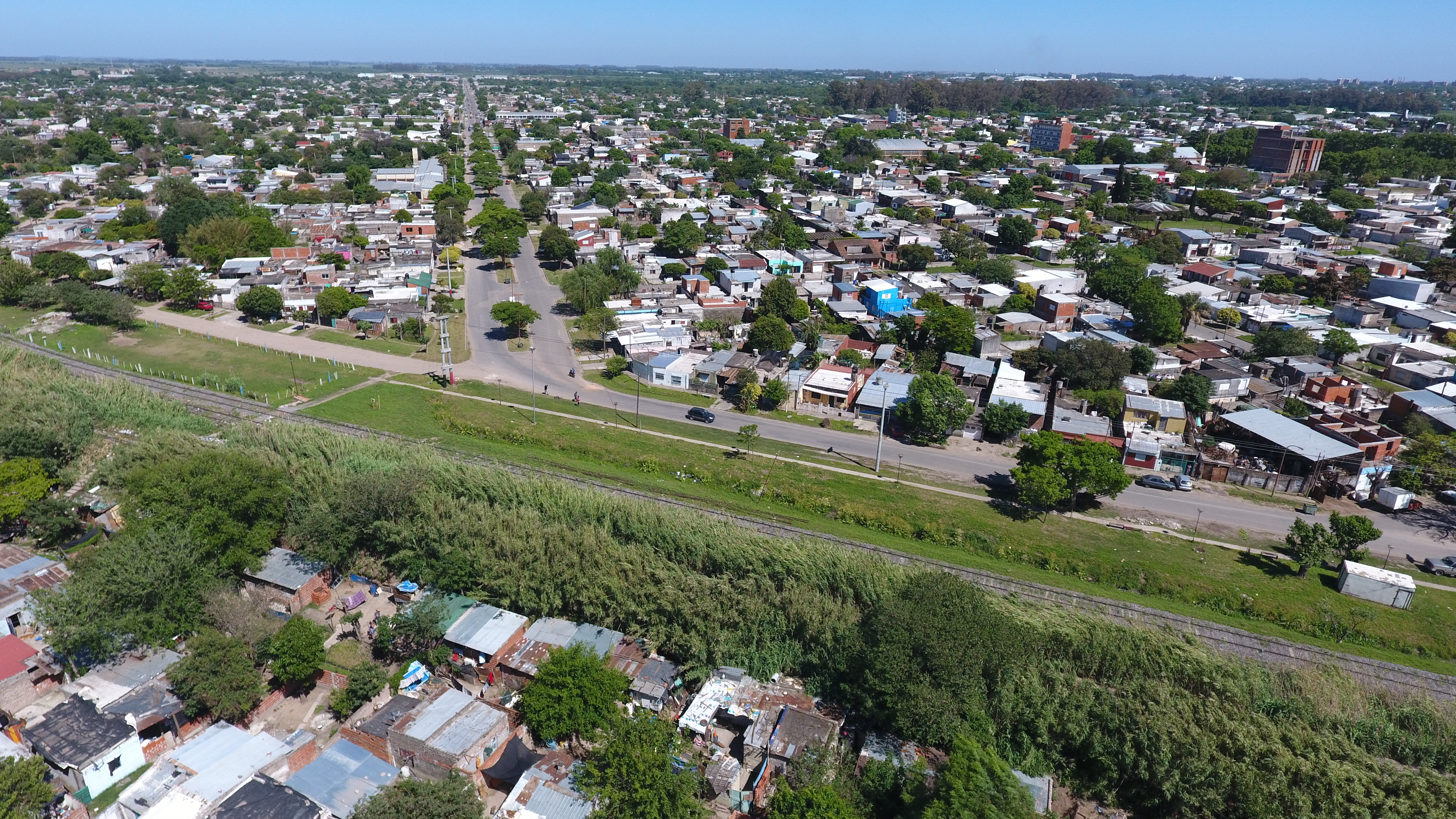

Villa Gobernador Gálvez is a city in the province of Santa Fe, Argentina, located on the western ravine of the Paraná River, within the metropolitan area of Greater Rosario. It had 74,509 inhabitants per the 2001 census [INDEC]. It is separated from Rosario, to the north, by the Saladillo Stream. It is the fourth most populated city in the province and the second in the metropolitan area.

The city was founded by an Italian immigrant, engineer Enrico Mosconi, on 25 February 1888 (he was the father of military engineer General Enrique Mosconi, first director of the YPF state oil company). Dr. José Gálvez, governor of Santa Fe since 1886, hired Mosconi to trace the railway system that would link this province to Mendoza. For this purpose Mosconi acquired land, and upon authorization by the governor, set up a village, populated mostly by other immigrants from Italy and Spain.

The town was declared a city by Governor Carlos Sylvestre Begnis on 12 April 1962. At the time it had about 18,000 inhabitants. What today is called "Villa Gobernador Gálvez" is in fact an aggregate of three towns: V. G. Gálvez proper, Villa Diego and Pueblo Nuevo. The history of the city is preserved in a public museum (Dr. Raúl Malatesta Municipal Museum), established in 1986 and managed by an association of citizens.

Villa Gobernador Gálvez is divided in about 20 barrios (neighborhoods). It has a public hospital (Anselmo Gamen Hospital) and several minor public healthcare centers, a number of sports clubs, five banks, and two FM radio stations. Telephone and Internet services are provided by a cooperative.

== Notable people ==
- Ezequiel Barco, soccer player on loan to Club Atlético River Plate
- Ezequiel Lavezzi, former professional soccer player who represented the Argentina national football team from 2007 to 2016
