= Nora Giménez =

Argentine politician

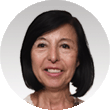

National Senator
- Incumbent
- Assumed office 10 December 2019
- Constituency: Salta

Provincial Deputy of Salta
- In office 10 December 2005 – 10 December 2007
- Constituency: Capital Department

Personal details
- Born: 18 July 1957 (age 69) Frías, Santiago del Estero, Argentina
- Party: Victory Party
- Other political affiliations: Front for Victory (2003–2017); Frente de Todos (since 2019)
- Education: National University of Salta

Nora del Valle Giménez (born 18 July 1957) is an Argentine human rights activist and politician. She currently serves as a National Senator for Salta Province as part of the Frente de Todos coalition.

== Personal life ==
Nora del Valle Giménez was born in Frías, in Santiago del Estero, Argentina, on 18 July 1957. In 1974 she was elected by her classmates as regional delegate of the NOA of the UES (Union of Secondary Students). She has five children and five grandchildren, and defines herself as a fervent defender of social justice and the role of women in all areas of society. Although she did not finish her degree in literature, she studied at the National University of Salta.

== Political detention ==
When the political violence began in 1976, Giménez moved to Chaco. One morning that year while she was walking with her son Alberto, a group of soldiers illegally detained her, blindfolded her and took her to the local brigade of investigations. Four days later her son would be handed over to the grandparents, thus preventing the baby from becoming children of the disappeared. Giménez was held incommunicado for several months and would later be transferred to Resistencia. She would be transferred again to Devoto prison and finally to Ezeiza prison where she would spend the last part of her imprisonment.

It is still unclear how Giménez was saved from being executed or disappearing. According to what was reconstructed by the victim, she was going to be assassinated together with other militants in the so-called Margarita Belén massacre, but apparently she was saved by a weather contingency. In prison, her family could visit her sporadically, but her son Alberto could not. Her husband, Carlos Valladares, was in exile in Peru. Communication with her son took place mostly through letters that were censored by the government. She was sentenced to 25 years in prison for subversion and illicit association in a "court martial", a kind of summary trial conducted by the military in which the accused were blindfolded and had no right to defense. She was released on 28 December 1983, after the return of democracy and the arrival of Raul Alfonsín to the presidency, because the military resolutions were revised and many political prisoners were able to return to their homes.

During Giménez's confinement, her unionist husband would die abroad and her son would grow up to be eight years old. By the time she left prison, her fellow activists were either dead or disappeared. Giménez married again, but this time to a man from Salta, also a victim of repression, moved to Salta and resumed her political activities.

== Political career ==
=== Beginnings ===
After her release from prison, Giménez returned to participate in politics as a member of the leadership of the Juventud Peronista of Salta. She was also a member of the permanent human rights assembly of Salta. In 1985, she was appointed coordinator of the popular culture program of the cultural area of the province of Salta. Then she began to rotate in different positions, always in the civil service, director of programming and management control of the Ministry of Social Welfare, secretary of the welfare cooperative of the City of Salta, director of social promotion of the Ministry of Social Welfare, advisor to the Ministry of Social Welfare of the province, coordinator of the program "The Constitution of the Province of Salta adapted for children", among other positions.

=== Councillor of the City of Salta ===
In 1999, Giménez obtained her first elective office, being elected by the citizens of Salta as councillor of the city. On that occasion, she was appointed vice-president of the justicialist block and president of the public works and urbanism commission. She would renew her mandate for the period 2001-2003 and would also be elected by her fellow councillors as president of the Deliberative Council of the City of Salta, a position whose responsibilities include presiding over the sessions but also acting as president of the executive department in the event of absence, resignation or dismissal of the mayor. She would renew her seat again for the 2003-2005 period but would no longer be appointed president of the legislative body, being succeeded by Álvaro Ulloa.

=== Provincial deputy ===
Giménez would no longer seek her fourth term on the city council but would try to land in the Chamber of Deputies of the Province of Salta. She won her seat in the Salta Chamber of Deputies as a representative of the Capital Department on the Justicialist Party list. Her peers elected her as president of the human rights commission.

=== Minister of Labour and Social Welfare ===
Nora resigned from her seat in the lower house of Salta to assume the position of Minister of Labour in the government of Juan Manuel Urtubey.

After two years in the post, Giménez resigned to run for national deputy, part of her campaign was to criticise the use of state resources for proselytising by the governor and his candidate. Unlike Ricardo Gómez Diez, who filed a criminal complaint against the governor, Giménez's complaints are not judicial, only media-related. She would not make it to the general election because she would resign her candidacy some time before the election.

=== National Senator ===
Giménez would run for national senator in second term, behind the president of the Victory Party and at that time national deputy, Sergio Leavy. In the PASO elections at the national level, the Frente de Todos would win in the senatorial category with 308,073 votes (48.44%) over the 143,612 votes (22.58%) of the Juntos por el Cambio coalition. Leavy and Giménez would win in the senatorial category, winning two majority seats, one for him and one for her. The minority senator would be former governor Juan Carlos Romero. Frente de Todos obtained 311,770 votes which meant a total of 45.96% of the valid votes, the main rival, Romero, would manage to grow with respect to the PASO but it would not be enough to turn the result around. His votes were 239,676 and he received 35.33% of the votes.

As a senator, Giménez was elected by her peers as president of the Committee on Regional Economies, Social Economy, Micro, Small and Medium Enterprises. She is also a member of the committees on Foreign Affairs and Worship, Internal Security and Drug Trafficking, Environment and Sustainable Development, and Tourism, among others.
