= General Ballivián =

- Municipality and village
- Location within Salta Province Location within Argentina
- Country: Argentina
- Province: Salta Province

Population (2001)
  - Total: 1,591
- Time zone: UTC−3 (ART)

General Ballivián is a village and rural municipality in Salta Province in northwestern Argentina. General Ballivián's hot subtropical climate is nestled between the subtropical and Chaco Salta at the foot of the mountains of Tartagal. It is considered part of the "vermilion region". General Ballivián was founded when oil was found in the area.

== Population ==
In 2001, General Ballivián had 1,591 inhabitants (INDEC), which represents an increase of 51.7% compared to the 1,049 inhabitants (INDEC) of the previous census in 1991.

== Name Sake ==
General Ballivián is named in tribute to Bolivian ex-president (1841–1847) and General José Ballivián (1805–1852). Ballivián was known as a warrior who diplomatically and militarily tried unsuccessfully to expand Bolivia to obtain an ocean port in Arica, Chile.
