= Funston Elementary School =

Public elementary school in Chicago, Illinois, United States

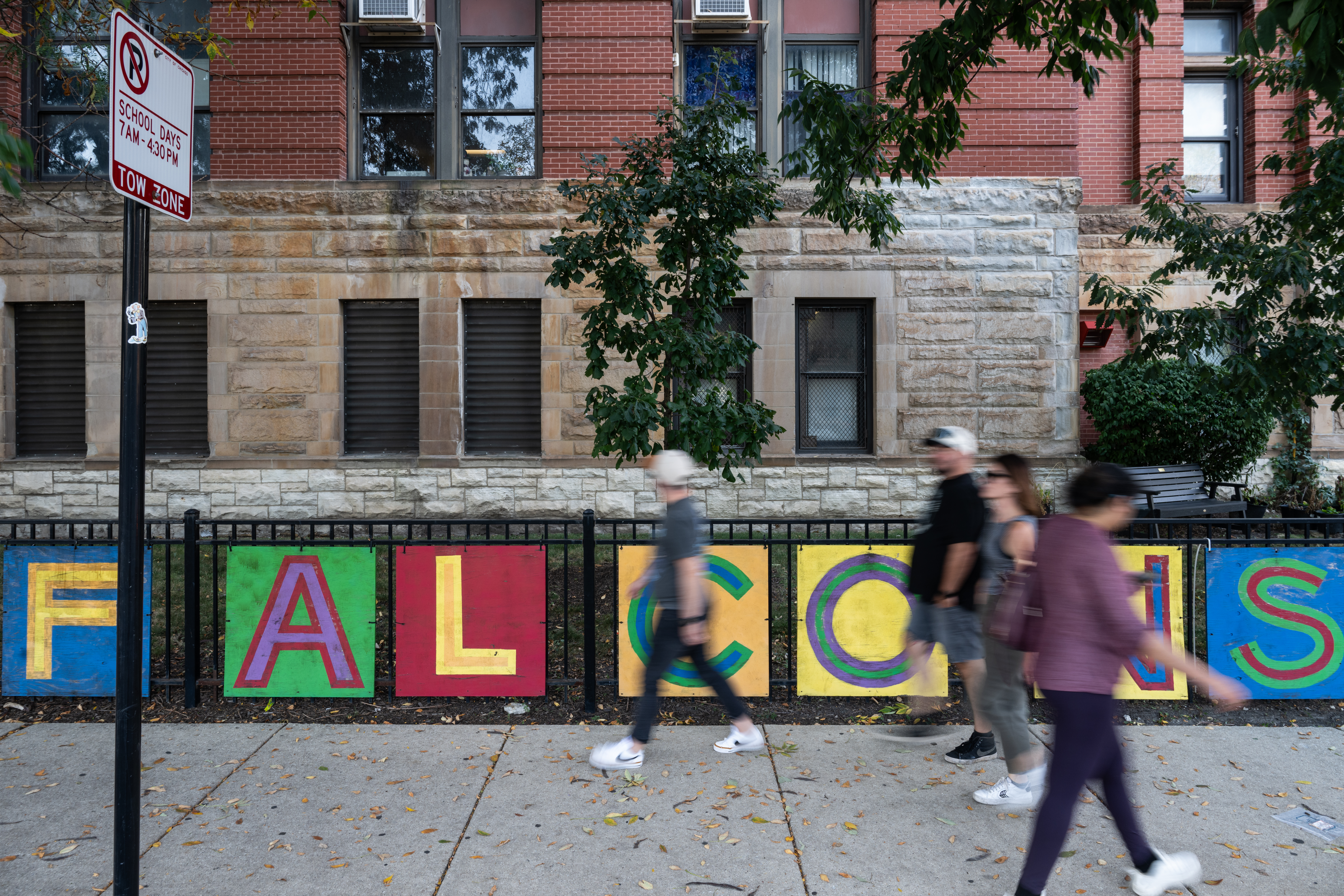
- Funston Elementary School in 2025

Location
- 2010 North Central Park Avenue; Chicago, Illinois 60647; United States; 41.9175°N 87.7175°W

Information
- Former name: Bismarck Elementary School
- School type: Public school
- School district: Chicago Public Schools
- Grades: PK–8
- Enrollment: 440 (2024–25)
- Student to teacher ratio: 9.89
- Website: funston.cps.edu

Frederick Funston Elementary School, commonly known as Funston Elementary School, is a public elementary school in the Logan Square neighborhood of Chicago, Illinois, United States. Operated by Chicago Public Schools, the school enrolls about 440 students in grades pre-kindergarten through eight. It opened in the mid-1890s as the Bismarck Elementary School and was renamed in 1918, amid anti-German sentiment during World War I, for U.S. Army general Frederick Funston.

The school has been a center of parent and community organizing in Logan Square. The Logan Square Neighborhood Association's parent mentor program, which was later replicated in dozens of schools across Illinois, began at Funston in 1995. In 2025 the school received national attention after a federal agent released tear gas across the street from it during an immigration enforcement operation.

== History ==
The school was built at the northwest corner of Central Park and Armitage Avenues in the mid-1890s and was named the Bismarck Elementary School, for German chancellor Otto von Bismarck; the Chicago Board of Education's architect reported construction under way in July 1895. After learning of the naming, Bismarck wrote to the board from Friedrichsruh in August 1895 that he felt "highly complimented that you should honor me by giving your new school my name". The letter was read at the board's meeting of September 25, 1895.

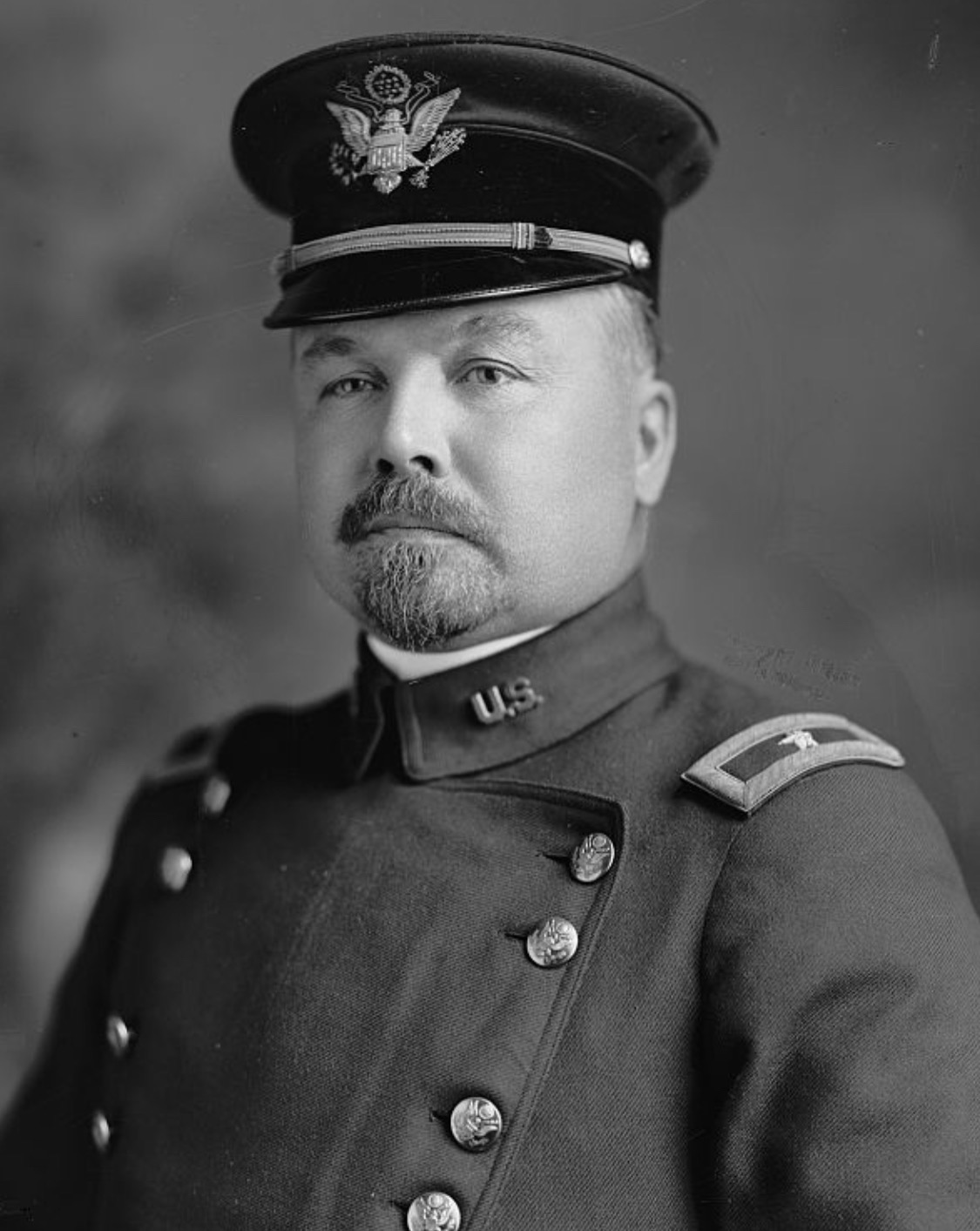
Frederick Funston, the school's namesake

After the United States entered World War I in 1917, anti-German feeling led to demands that the school be renamed, as Bismarck was seen as a symbol of German militarism. After a dispute that ran for months, the Chicago Board of Education renamed the school on May 1, 1918, for Frederick Funston, a general who had fought in the Philippine–American War, led the Army's response to the 1906 San Francisco earthquake, and died in 1917 while in line to command American forces in Europe. Pupils at the school celebrated the new name the day after the board's action.

=== Immigration enforcement ===
In February 2017, more than 100 parent leaders with the Logan Square Neighborhood Association gathered at Funston to declare Logan Square schools "sanctuary zones" for immigrant students and their families. The campaign included signs at school entrances, immigration law workshops, and emergency plans for school staff.

On October 3, 2025, a federal agent threw tear gas canisters from a vehicle near the corner of Central Park and Armitage avenues, across the street from the school, during an immigration enforcement operation at a nearby grocery store carried out under Operation Midway Blitz. Gas drifted toward school grounds while classes were in session; students who were outside at recess were brought indoors, and the school held recess inside for the rest of the day. The Department of Homeland Security said agents deployed the gas after attempting to disperse a crowd.

Teachers described lasting fear among students. Chicago Public Schools created a command center to monitor immigration enforcement activity near its schools. After the incident, community volunteers lined nearby streets at arrival and dismissal times to form escorted walking routes for students and their families. Mayor Brandon Johnson visited the school on October 9 and condemned the federal enforcement campaign.

== Academics and demographics ==
Funston serves a predominantly Hispanic student body drawn from the western part of Logan Square and offers instruction in both Spanish and English. In the 2024–25 school year the school enrolled 440 students in grades pre-kindergarten through eight, with a student–teacher ratio of 9.89.

== Community programs ==
The Logan Square Neighborhood Association's parent mentor program began at Funston in 1995, started by principal Sally Acker and the association as a way to bring immigrant parents into classrooms. Participating parents volunteer two hours each school day in classrooms other than their own children's and receive training and a stipend. The program was later adopted elsewhere; by 2013 it operated in 65 schools across Illinois, 14 of them run by the association.

== Notable alumni ==
- Kenneth W. Course, Illinois state legislator.
