= Campamento Vespucio =

Coordinates: 22°36′S 63°49′W

- Municipality and village
- Interactive map of Campamento Vespucio
- Country: Argentina
- Province: Salta Province
- Department: General José de San Martín
- Time zone: UTC−3 (ART)

Campamento Vespucio is a village and rural municipality in the department of General José de San Martin, in Salta Province in northwestern Argentina. It was established in the beginning of the 20th century due to the discovery and exploitation of oil.
