= Enrico Mosconi =

Italian engineer

Engineer Enrico Mosconi
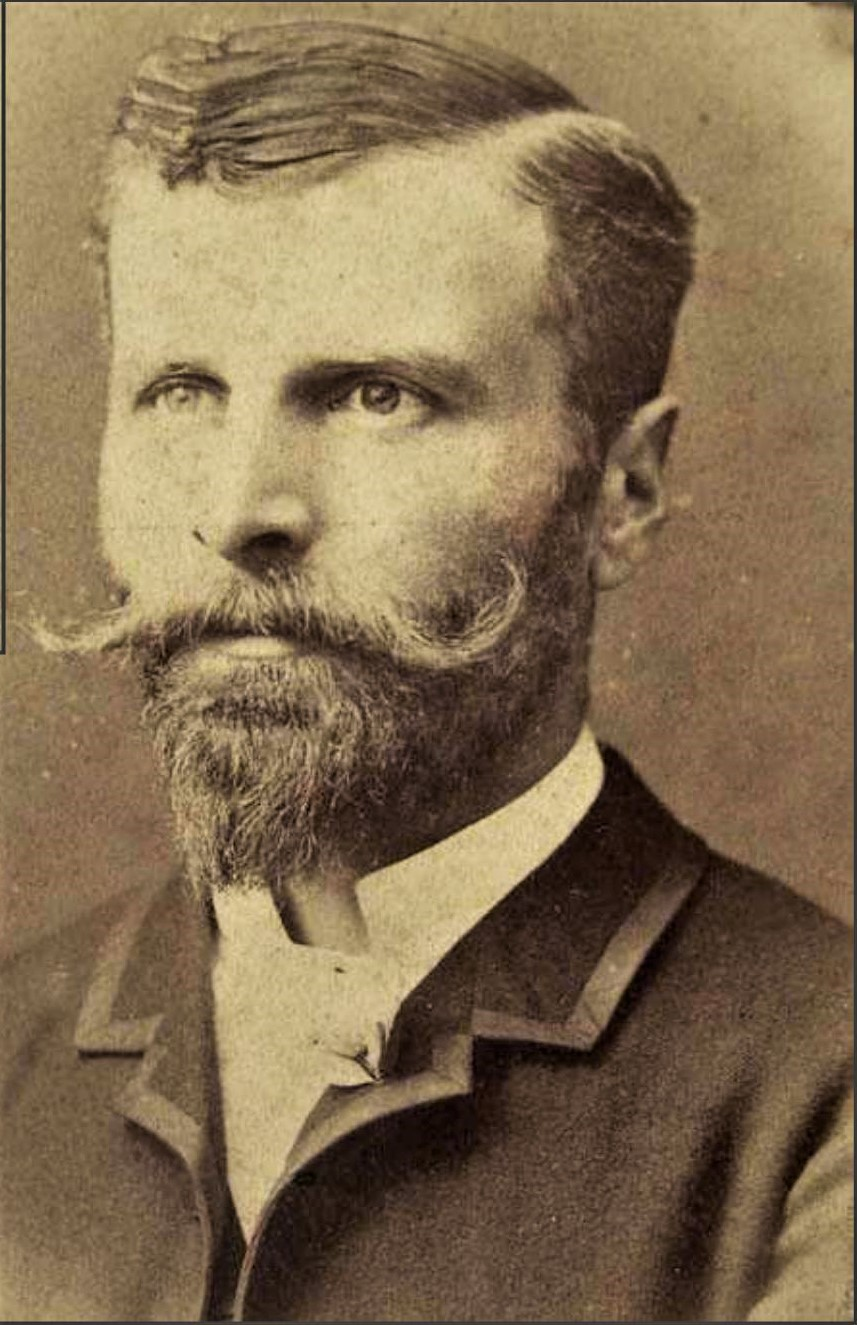
- Enrico Mosconi in 1875

Personal details
- Born: 1843 Milan, Austrian Empire
- Died: 1910 (aged 66–67) Buenos Aires, Argentina
- Spouse(s): María Juana Canavery; María Luisa Matti
- Occupation: businessman
- Profession: engineer

Enrico Mosconi (1843-1910) was an Italian engineer and the father of the General Enrique Mosconi. He actively participated in the construction of the railways in the Argentine Republic.

== Biography ==
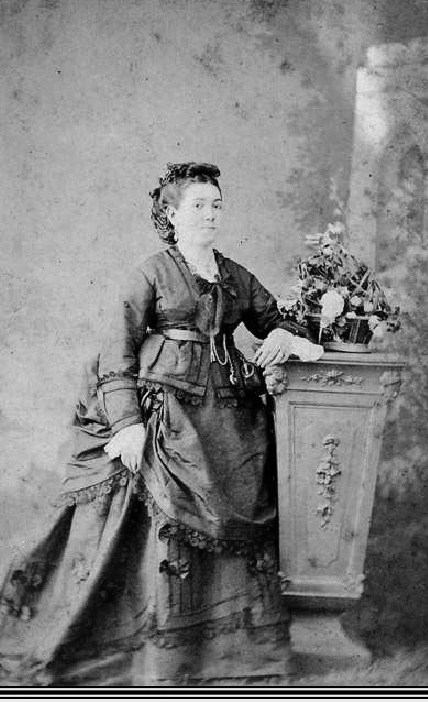
His first wife, María Juana Canavery

Enrico Mosconi was born in 1843 in Milan, Austrian Empire, the son of Domenico Mosconi and Maria Tirola, belonging to a distinguished Lombard family. He did his university studies in Italy, and arrived in Buenos Aires about 1869, for work related to construction of the Central Argentine Railway.

Settled permanently in Argentina, Enrico Mosconi worked as an engineer for the laying of a telegraph network. In Santa Fe Province he was commissioned to draw a plan for railway línes. By the mid-1870s, he was entrusted to perform work in the Cuartel of Retiro, and he was also hired to do work for the Ferrocarril del Sud.

Mosconi had an extensive career as an entrepreneur linked to the railroad business. He was the owner of the Enrique Mosconi y Cía, a steam tram company that operated in Rosario towards the end of the 19th century.

He was closely linked to the Italian community of Santa Fe. On February 25, 1888, he founded the city of Villa Gobernador Gálvez, and created a journal for the Italian community in the city Rosario.

He is registered with his brother Eduardo Mosconi, serving as commissioners of the Censo general de poblacion, edificacion, comercio é industria de la ciudad de Buenos Aires of 1889.

== Family ==
Mabel Gorchs, granddaughter of Mosconi and Juana M. Canavery

He married María Juana Canavery, born in the city to Tomás Canaverys and Macedonia Castillo, belonging to a distinguished patrician family. She was the great-granddaughter of Juan Canaverys, an Italian of French or Irish ancestry who had an active participation during the May Revolution.

He and his wife made several trips to southern European cities, including Milan, Italy, where his daughter Ernestina was born. His wife died on September 14, 1881, in Nice, France, after giving birth to Ricardo Mosconi. Enrico Mosconi returned to Buenos Aires that year with the two youngest children, leaving the older children in a prestigious school located in the Alpes-Maritimes region.

His second wife was María Luisa Matti, born in Buenos Aires, the daughter of Guillermo Matti and Hermenegilda Pagani, natives of Switzerland. His father-in-law was an entrepreneur, linked to the construction of the Buenos Aires Campana railway).

In Buenos Aires he maintained friendly ties with distinguished members of the local aristocracy, including Roque Sáenz Peña, Adolfo Alsina, godfather of María Mosconi Canavery, and Carlos Pellegrini, godfather of Guillermo Mosconi Matti. He also had excellent relations with the British and Irish community of Argentina. His niece Sara Mosconi was married to Juan Bird Guillon, belonging to a family of Galway.

In 1888 Enrico Mosconi acquired land in the town Los Algarrobos (San Martín Department), belonging to Agustín Hamilton Johnston, born in Newcastle. Mosconi suggested the change of the denomination of the town in honor of his friend Carlos Pellegrini, whose mother Mary Bevans Brigh was originally from London, England.
