= Diana Conti =

Argentine lawyer and politician (1956–2024)

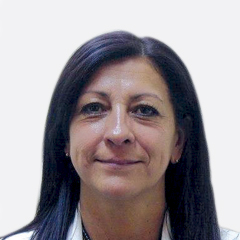
- Conti in 2017

National Deputy
- In office 10 December 2005 – 10 December 2017
- Constituency: Buenos Aires
- In office 10 December 1997 – 10 December 1999
- Constituency: Buenos Aires

Councillor of Magistracy
- In office 10 December 2006 – 10 December 2010
- Appointed by: Chamber of Deputies

National Senator
- In office 3 July 2002 – 10 December 2005
- Preceded by: Raúl Alfonsín
- Succeeded by: Hilda González de Duhalde
- Constituency: Buenos Aires

Undersecretary of Human Rights
- In office 10 December 1999 – 20 January 2001
- Succeeded by: Oscar Luján Fappiano

Personal details
- Born: 29 March 1956 Buenos Aires, Argentina
- Died: 8 March 2024 (aged 67)
- Party: Revolutionary Communist Party (until 1994); Victory Party (2003–2024)
- Other political affiliations: FREPASO (2001–2003); Front for Victory (2003–2017); Frente de Todos (2019–2023)
- Education: University of Buenos Aires
- Profession: Lawyer

Diana Beatriz Conti (29 March 1956 – 8 March 2024) was an Argentine lawyer and politician. She was a member of the Argentine National Congress both as a National Deputy (1997–1999; 2005–2017) and as a Senator (2002–2005); she also served as Undersecretary of Human Rights in the administration of Fernando de la Rúa from 1999 to 2001 and as a member of the Council of Magistracy (appointed by the Chamber of Deputies) from 2006 to 2010, where she rose to prominence as a staunch supporter of President Cristina Fernández de Kirchner's judicial reform proposals.

A longtime supporter of Fernández de Kirchner and the late Néstor Kirchner, Conti was the leader of the Victory Party, a founding member of the Kirchnerist coalition Front for Victory and later part of the Frente de Todos.

== Early years ==
Conti was born in 1956 in Buenos Aires; her father, Horacio Conti, was a travelling salesman, while her mother, Martha Bascuas, was an English teacher. Throughout high school she was an active member of the Revolutionary Communist Party (PCR).

Conti studied social psychology at the Pichon-Rivière School and worked as a volunteer at Hospital Borda, then going on to study law at the University of Buenos Aires, where she received her licenciatura in 1980. She later set up her own law firm.

== Career ==
=== Work in the judiciary ===
Conti became the justice minister's cabinet helper in 1991. She held various administrative positions in Buenos Aires until 1994, when she left for Santa Fe, where she worked as Eugenio Raul Zaffaroni's legal helper for one month. She got a job on 16 March of that year as the University of Buenos Aires' penal rights and criminology department's secretary, so traveling between Buenos Aires and Santa Fe daily became a burden to Conti, who decided to quit her job in Santa Fe after only one month working there.

=== Early political career ===
Conti was appointed undersecretary of human rights on 12 December 1997, prompting her to forgo her job at Buenos Aires University to concentrate on her new post. On 26 December 2001, she stepped down from that position, aiming to become undersecretary for institutional reform and national strengthening of democracy in Argentina (part of the Cabinet Chief's Office), position to which she was appointed on 23 January 2002.

At the 2001 legislative election, Conti ran for a seat in the National Senate representing Buenos Aires Province in the Frepaso ticket alongside former president Raúl Alfonsín; the Frepaso list came second, and so only Alfonsín was elected to office. However, in June 2002, the former president stepped down from his Senate seat, prompting Conti to leave the undersecretariat and take Alfonsín's vacant seat in the Senate. Despite having run on the Frepaso ticket, Conti remained aligned to the Justicialist Party government of Eduardo Duhalde while in the Senate until 2003, when she joined the newly formed Front for Victory of president Néstor Kirchner.

Upon joining the new front, she joined the newly created Partido de la Victoria, or Victory Party, which has been allied to all Kirchnerist political alliances formed ever since.

In December 2005, she was elected a deputy for Buenos Aires Province for the Front for Victory and was also known for several corruption acts as a member of the government.

On 4 February 2010, while she was defending Cristina Kirchner presidency a journalist—Jose Eliaschev—told her that the argument she was using remember the ones used by Russian dictator Josef Stalin, and she said "yes, I have no problem to be a Stalinist", and the journalist insisted "you are a supporter of one of the biggest murderers of 20th century, 20 million of people murdered? I am a Stalinist, signed Diana Conti, can I record that?" the journalist said, and Diana Conti answered "Yes, I have no problem to be Stalinist, maybe it is your problem, not mine".

== Corruption case ==
While a senator, she was accused (2005) and found innocent (2012) as part of the cause that was processed before the National Court for Criminal and Correctional No. 6 by Dr. Rodolfo Canicoba Corral. The file had been issued by virtue of a complaint filed by a former employee at the Senate, Bruno Bimbi, at which time the appointee claimed to have been forced to give much of their pay under threat of losing his job. The case was initially dismissed by Judge Jose Codino in late August 2005, but the court of appeal re-opened a little later. According to Bimbi, many of the employees who appeared as Conti personnel on official documents were completely unknown to him and other real employees under the direction of Diana Conti (in fact, one was the son of Conti). In the words of Bimbi, the first time that forced him to give him the money he had just withdrawn from the bank, and seeing his face in amazement, said, "you can keep the coins", exact words of Mr. Bimbi. These statements were dismissed in the trial that was carried forward. The result was dismissed at first instance and subsequent confirmation of this ruling by the Room number 9 of the Hon. Court of Appeals in the Criminal and Correctional matter´s Federal Camera.

== Later years ==
During April 2006, Conti returned to the public light when she began a campaign in favour of laws for harsher punishment to those found guilty of sexual harassment at work, regardless of sexual gender. A divorced woman, Conti participated in several seminars and law clinics in Argentina. During 2012 she had appearances in public, such as when referring to the possible re-election of the President Cristina Kirchner.

Conti died on 8 March 2024, at the age of 67.
