= Aguaray =

Aguaray Ciudad Norte de Aguaray/Aguada del zorro
- City
- Location of Aguaray in Argentina
- Coordinates: 22°30′S 63°50′W
- Country: Argentina
- Province: Salta
- Department: General José de San Martín
- Founded: 1911

Government
  - Intendant: Guillermo Alemán

Area
  - Total: 280 km^{2} (110 sq mi)
- Elevation: 568 m (1,864 ft)
- Time zone: UTC−3 (ART)
- CPA base: A4566
- Dialing code: +54 3875
- Climate: Cwa

Aguaray (Spanish pronunciation: [aɣwaˈɾaj]) is a city in the province of Salta, General José de San Martín department, northern Argentina. It is located near the Argentina-Bolivia border.

== Climate ==
Climate data for Aguaray (1939–1990)
Month	Jan	Feb	Mar	Apr	May	Jun	Jul	Aug	Sep	Oct	Nov	Dec	Year
Daily mean °C (°F)	24.4 (75.9)	23.5 (74.3)	22.5 (72.5)	19.7 (67.5)	17.3 (63.1)	14.4 (57.9)	14.2 (57.6)	15.8 (60.4)	18.2 (64.8)	21.7 (71.1)	23.0 (73.4)	24.0 (75.2)	19.9 (67.8)
Average precipitation mm (inches)	226 (8.9)	179 (7.0)	172 (6.8)	98 (3.9)	22 (0.9)	10 (0.4)	3 (0.1)	5 (0.2)	7 (0.3)	49 (1.9)	105 (4.1)	194 (7.6)	1,070 (42.1)
Source: Instituto Nacional de Tecnología Agropecuaria

== Abstract foundation ==
- 1911: Bureau of Mines of the Nation begins an unsuccessful oil drilling
- 1917: former employees of the national distribution, is rooted in the place "Aguaray", dedicated to agriculture and livestock, timber and trade activity.
- 1925: teacher Laura Molina opens the first school in Aguaray
- 1924: Tartagal, the sister city of Aguaray, is founded
- 1928: railway station is founded
- 1938: House of Authority is founded
- 1939: commissary is founded
- 1969: Dr. Luis Guemes opens City Hospital of Aguaray

== Intendants of the city ==
- Laudino Delgado
- Julian Anad
- Ernesto Aparicio
- Sergio Nieva
- Lauro Roman
- Lucio Ledesma
- Juan Salas
- Rafael Bacha
- Jose Osvaldo Zelarayan
- Ismael Silva
- Federico Gonzales
- Tomas Ramos
- Hector Carlos Alberto Elizaran
- Armando Velasquez
- Sergio Nieva
- Luis Gutierrez
- Ciro Guardatti
- Horacio Cabeza
- Guillermo Vazques
- David Vera
- Carlos Orellana Garcia
- Reynaldo Chein
- Emilio Ferreyra
- Ernesto Morales
- Alberto Nazer
- Angel Eduardo Blasco
- Enrique Campos
- Alberto Creche
- Roberto Alberto Carmuega
- Juan de Juanini
- Angel Eduardo Blasco
- Luis Zabala
- Gloria Delma Tejerina de Salvatierra
- Jose Oscar Gil
- Norman Domingo Monteros
- Juan Carlos Alcoba.
- Alfredo Darouiche

== School and education ==
The following is a list of schools and their opening dates:

- School 4.324 Julio Ramon Pereyra (1925)
- School 4.440 Maria Agapita Toro de Lahud (1928)
- School 4.735 San Francisco de Asis (1934)
- School 4.542 Dr. Roberto Lanzi (1941)
- School 4.736 Mision la Loma (1944)
- School 4.736 San Miguel Arcangel (1947)
- School 4.525 de Timboirenda (1948)
- School 4.100 San Jose de Yacuy (1955)
- School 7.018 Nocturna Policarpo Segovia (1963)
- School 4.134 Gauchos de Guemes (1963)
- School 4.137 Virgen de Fatima (1964)
- High school de comercio 5.006 Mariano Moreno (1964)
- High School 3.120 de educación Tecnica (1966)
- School 4.149 Dique Itiyuro 1968)
- School 4.159 Regimiento 1 de infanteria Patricios de Campo Largo (1970)
- School 4.175 de Macueta
- School 4.210 Vicente Lopez y Planes (1973)
- School 4.242 Monseñor Francisco de la Cruz Muguerza (1977)
- BSPA 7.082 Republica Oriental del Uruguay (1988)
- High School 3.143 educación Tecnica (1984)
- School Technical 7.133 Monotecnica (1990)
- High School 3.130 tecnica Emeta II (1992)
- Tertiary school 7.052 Anexo de Educación Especial (1998)
- School 8.178 de la familia Agricola, padre Ernesto Martearena (2001)
- School 4.777 de el Algarrobal

== Sources ==
- Argentina – World Gazetteer
