= Victory Party (Argentina) =

Argentine political party

Victory Party Partido de la Victoria
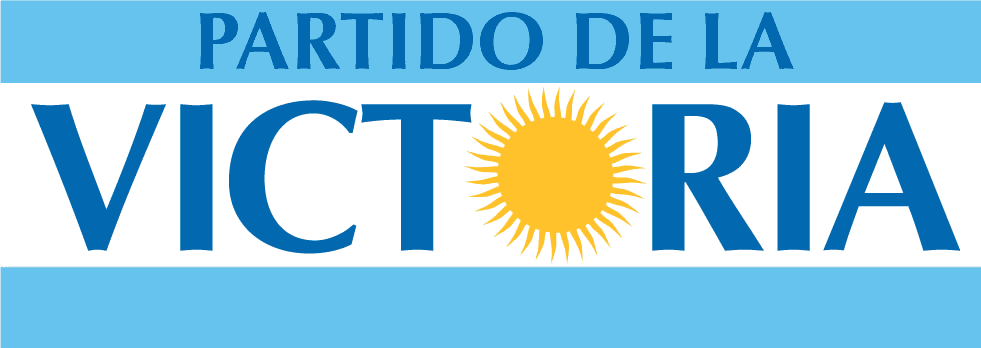
- Leader: Diana Conti
- Founded: 25 February 2003; 22 years ago
- Split from: Justicialist Party
- Membership (2017): ▼34,914
- Ideology: Social democracy Kirchnerism
- Political position: Centre-left to left-wing
- National affiliation: Homeland Force
- Colors: Sky blue
- Seats in the Chamber of Deputies: 2 / 257
- Seats in the Senate: 2 / 72

Website
- www.partidodelavictoria.com.ar

The Victory Party (Spanish: Partido de la Victoria) is a minor Kirchnerist political party in Argentina founded in 2003 by Néstor Kirchner and Diana Conti to group independent sectors (those who were not aligned with the Justicialist Party) of the Kirchnerist coalition. The party now forms part of the Unión por la Patria, the former ruling coalition supporting then- President Alberto Fernández and supported Sergio Massa's presidential campaign. The party was a founding member of the similarly named Front for Victory, the coalition that led Néstor Kirchner to the presidency in the 2003 election.

== History ==
The Victory Party was founded in 2003 to bring together all the independent sectors of the Justicialist Party that felt represented by Kirchnerism to support Néstor Kirchner’s bid in that year’s general election.

Since its inception, the party has been part of the Front for Victory alliance, accompanying the candidacy of Néstor Kirchner in 2003, and Cristina Fernández de Kirchner in 2007 and 2011. In the 2015 elections, the Victory Party, as part of the FPV, supported the candidacy of former Vice President Daniel Scioli, who lost the elections to businessman and politician Mauricio Macri.

Following the 2019 general election, the party has representation both in the Argentine Senate (where the president of its Salta chapter, Sergio Leavy, sits in representation of Salta Province) and in the Argentine Chamber of Deputies (with deputies María Cristina Britez and Alcira Figueroa). Another deputy, Juan Emilio Ameri, sat in the lower chamber until 25 September 2020, when he resigned amid a sex scandal.

== Electoral performance ==
=== President ===
Election year	Candidate	Coalition	1st round		2nd round		Result
Election year	Candidate	Coalition	# of overall votes	% of overall vote	# of overall votes	% of overall vote	Result
2003	Néstor Kirchner	Front for Victory	4,312,517	22.25	Null	0	✓ 2nd-R Unopposed
2007	Cristina Kirchner	Front for Victory	8,651,066	45.29	—N/a		✓ Elected
2011	Cristina Kirchner	Front for Victory	11,865,055	54.11 (1st)	—N/a		✓ Elected
2015	Daniel Scioli	Front for Victory	9,338,449	37.08 (1st)	12,198,441	48.60 (2nd)	✗ 2-R Defeated
2019	Alberto Fernández	Frente de Todos	12,473,709	48.10 (1st)	—N/a		✓ Elected

=== Chamber of Deputies ===
Election year	Votes	%	seats won	total seats	position	presidency	notes
2003	5,865,303	37.28 (#1st)	0	0 / 257	Minority	Néstor Kirchner (PJ—FPV)	within Front for Victory
2005	6,735,048	39.04 (#1st)	1	1 / 257	Minority	Néstor Kirchner (PJ—FPV)	within Front for Victory
2007	8,329,168	46.17 (#1st)	0	1 / 257	Minority	Cristina Fernández de Kirchner (PJ—FPV)	within Front for Victory
2009	5,544,069	28.70 (#2nd)	1	1 / 257	Minority	Cristina Fernández de Kirchner (PJ—FPV)	within Front for Victory
2011	10,793,689	52.46 (#1st)	0	1 / 257	Minority	Cristina Fernández de Kirchner (PJ—FPV)	within Front for Victory
2013	7,422,451	32.82 (#1st)	1	1 / 257	Minority	Cristina Fernández de Kirchner (PJ—FPV)	within Front for Victory
2015	8,797,279	37.41 (#1st)	1	2 / 257	Minority	Mauricio Macri (PRO—Cambiemos)	within Front for Victory
2017	5,265,069	21.03 (#2nd)	1	2 / 257	Minority	Mauricio Macri (PRO—Cambiemos)	within Citizen's Unity
2019	11,359,508	45.50 (#1st)	1	2 / 257	Minority	Alberto Fernández (PJ—FDT)	within Frente de Todos

== See also ==
- Front for Victory
- Citizen's Unity
