= Moscone Recreation Center =

American park

Coordinates: 37°48′7″N 122°25′58″W

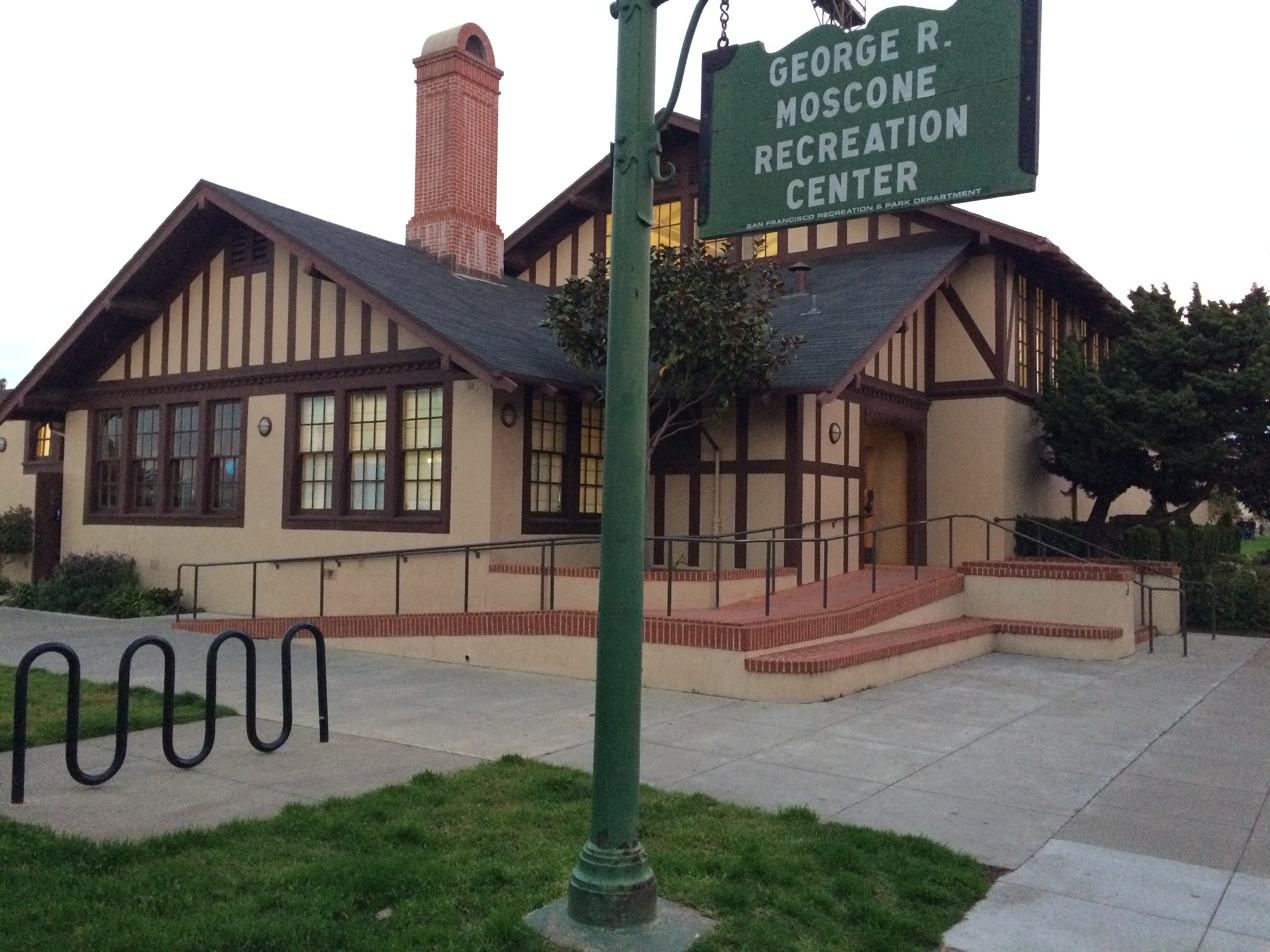
- Interactive map of Moscone Recreation Center
- Area: 12.07 acres (4.88 ha)
- Website: Moscone Rec Center

Moscone Recreation Center is a park located between Chestnut Street and Bay Street, Laguna Street and Webster Street in San Francisco's Marina District.

The area was renamed in honor of San Francisco mayor George Moscone, who was assassinated in 1978.

The park includes tennis courts, baseball diamonds, children's playgrounds, basketball courts, and putting greens.

The park has been a favorite of San Franciscans since its inception in the 1920s. Joe DiMaggio took Marilyn Monroe on a stroll at the park in the hours prior to their marriage at City Hall. Robin Williams, Danielle Steel, and Sharon Stone were known to take their small children to the park without fear of paparazzi.
