= Tartagal, Salta =

Tartagal
- City
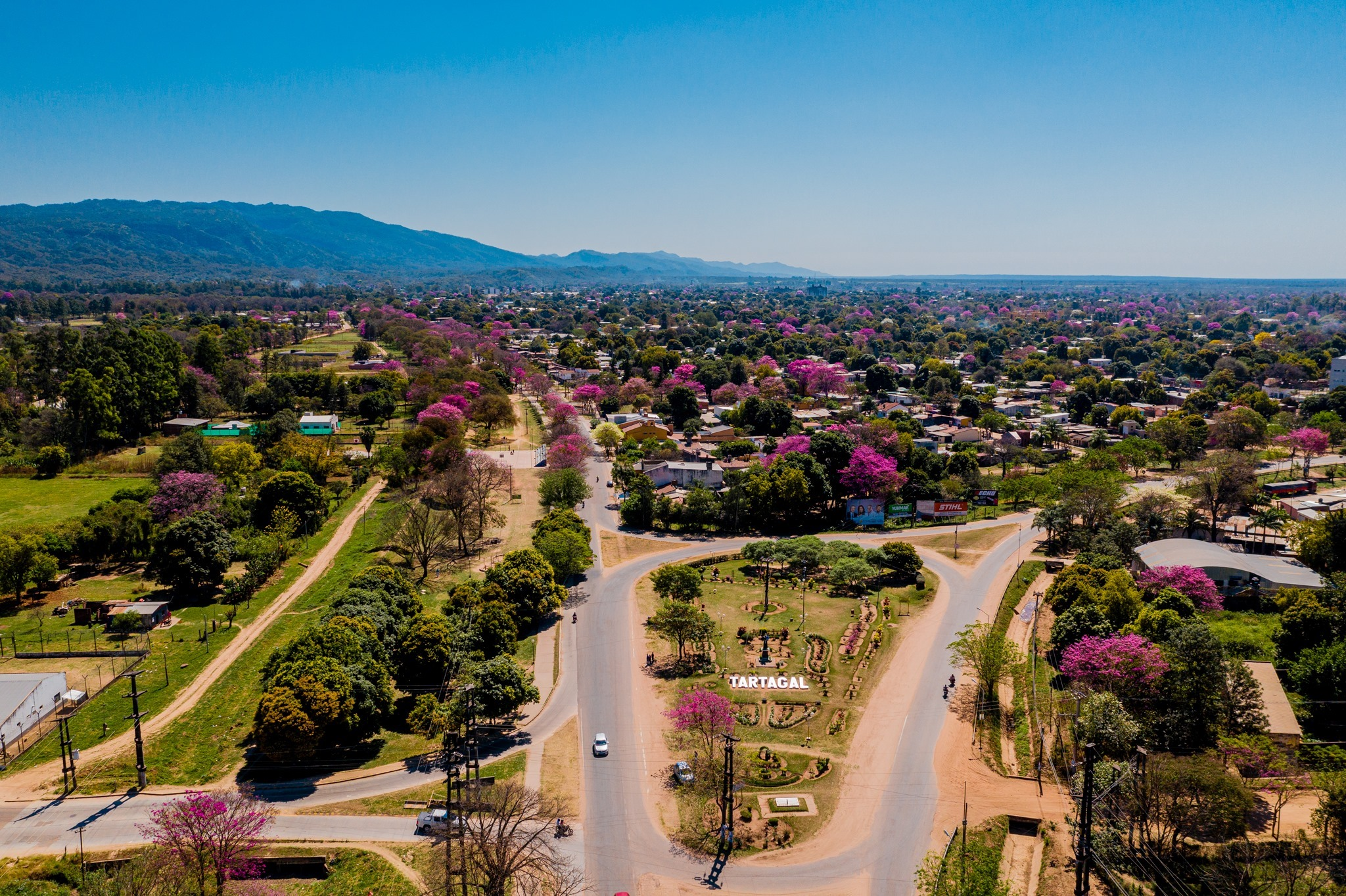
- Aerial view of Tartagal

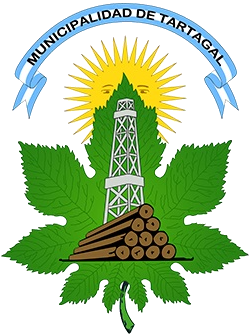
- Coat of arms

- Location of Tartagal in Argentina
- Coordinates: 22°30′S 63°50′W
- Country: Argentina
- Province: Salta
- Department: San Martín
- Founded: 1924

Government
  - Intendant: Franco Hernández Berni (PDV)

Area
  - Total: 3,015 km^{2} (1,164 sq mi)
- Elevation: 490 m (1,610 ft)

Population (2010 census)
  - Total: 63,196
  - Density: 20.96/km^{2} (54.29/sq mi)
- Time zone: UTC−3 (ART)
- CPA base: A4560
- Dialing code: +54 3875
- Climate: Cwa
- Website: Tartagal website

Tartagal (Spanish pronunciation: [taɾtaˈɣal]) is a tropical city in northern Argentina, in the province of Salta. It is located in the northeast of the province, within the General José de San Martín Department, of which it is the capital. It is located in the Yungas jungle, at the foot of the sub-Andean mountain ranges to the west and the Salta plains to the east. This location gives it a wide variety of flora and fauna, and its territory is home to eight indigenous communities. It stands out for the large density of large trees in its streets and squares, such as mangoes, algarrobos and lapachos. It is one of the few places in the world where the green macaw is not extinct in the wild.

Due to its economy, it is the third most important city in the province, after Orán. It stands out as a center for oil and gas extraction, and also has strong activity in the forestry and agricultural sectors.

It is located 365 km from the provincial capital, Salta, 57 km from the border with Bolivia (so it is considered a border city), 103 km from the border with Paraguay, and 1736 km from Buenos Aires. Tartagal is connected to the rest of the province and the country through National Route 34, National Route 86 and through the General Mosconi airport, although the latter does not receive commercial flights at present.

Tartagal houses a regional headquarters of the National University of Salta and the Catholic University of Salta. It also has learning centers from the Siglo 21 and Blas Pascal universities.

== History ==
Tartagal derives from the tártago plant (Euphorbia lathyris, a kind of spurge). The area of modern Tartagal appears with this name in legal documents for the first time in 1853. At the time the area belonged to the Tarija Department, Bolivia. The foundation date of the town, however, is acknowledged as June 13, 1924; the municipality was created soon afterwards, and Tartagal attained city status only on September 22, 1949.

The Argentine Army has the 17th Jungle Cazadores Company (Compañía de Cazadores de Monte 17) based at Tartagal.

At the beginning of the 20th century, important oil deposits were discovered which lead to the founding of Yacimientos Petrolíferos Fiscales (YPF). YPF was founded by Hipólito Yrigoyen in the 1922, and later privatized in 1992, was highly valued during the governmental terms of Juan Domingo Perón between the 40s and 50s. It was out-competing Standard Oil, in terms of production as well as in terms of social impact, since it ensured work, social security, education for the worker's children and dozens of benefits that dignified the lives of workers, not counting the commercial flow that positively impacted the area.

Petroleum was discovered here at the beginning of the 20th century. Since 1926 the state-owned oil company YPF employed or indirectly supported most of the local population. In 1992 the company was privatized (becoming Repsol-YPF) and 90% of its workers were fired, prompting violent social conflicts and, a few years later, the appearance of piquetero (unemployed workers) movements, similarly to what happened also in other oil-producing areas like Cutral-Co, Neuquén, and in the neighboring General Mosconi.

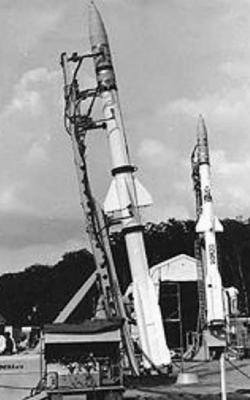
Orión-2 rockets prepared for solar eclipse observations at Tartagal (November 10, 1966)

On November 12, 1966, several sounding rockets were launched from Tartagal during a solar eclipse.

On February 9, 2009, heavy rains caused the Tartagal River to break its banks and flood much of the city, resulting in 11 casualties.

== Social Composition ==
The social composition of Tartagal is characterized by its cultural diversity. There are seven aboriginal ethnic groups that reside in Tartagal: wichís (or weenhayek), chiriguanos, chanés, quechuas, chorotes, chulupíes and Aymaras. Another important element of its social structure is the migratory component that is added to its population. Because of it is so close to Bolivia, a high percentage of its inhabitants are of Bolivian origin. Tartagal was the main destination of immigration of the peasant-livestock population of the east (commonly known as "Chaco") that settled, like the Aboriginals, in neighborhoods surrounding the city. It also has important foreign communities including: Christian Levantines (of Syrian-Lebanese origin), Greeks (with a Cypriot branch), Irish people, Paraguayans and Spaniards.

== Population ==
The last census, in the year 2010, the city of Tartagal had a population of 64,530 inhabitants, becoming the third most populated city of its province, surpassed only by the provincial capital and by San Ramón de la Nueva Orán.

== Climate ==
Climate data for Tartagal, Salta (1991–2020, extremes 1961–present)
Month	Jan	Feb	Mar	Apr	May	Jun	Jul	Aug	Sep	Oct	Nov	Dec	Year
Record high °C (°F)	43.6 (110.5)	42.6 (108.7)	39.6 (103.3)	37.5 (99.5)	36.8 (98.2)	34.7 (94.5)	37.7 (99.9)	41.0 (105.8)	43.0 (109.4)	44.3 (111.7)	44.8 (112.6)	44.2 (111.6)	44.8 (112.6)
Mean daily maximum °C (°F)	32.3 (90.1)	31.0 (87.8)	29.0 (84.2)	26.1 (79.0)	23.0 (73.4)	21.5 (70.7)	22.1 (71.8)	26.0 (78.8)	28.9 (84.0)	31.4 (88.5)	31.9 (89.4)	32.5 (90.5)	28.0 (82.4)
Daily mean °C (°F)	26.0 (78.8)	24.9 (76.8)	23.5 (74.3)	20.9 (69.6)	17.7 (63.9)	15.4 (59.7)	14.8 (58.6)	17.9 (64.2)	21.1 (70.0)	24.4 (75.9)	25.2 (77.4)	26.0 (78.8)	21.5 (70.7)
Mean daily minimum °C (°F)	20.8 (69.4)	20.3 (68.5)	19.5 (67.1)	17.1 (62.8)	13.6 (56.5)	11.1 (52.0)	9.3 (48.7)	10.9 (51.6)	14.1 (57.4)	18.0 (64.4)	19.1 (66.4)	20.4 (68.7)	16.2 (61.2)
Record low °C (°F)	11.3 (52.3)	11.2 (52.2)	8.0 (46.4)	4.5 (40.1)	2.0 (35.6)	−2.6 (27.3)	−5.9 (21.4)	−5.4 (22.3)	0.4 (32.7)	2.4 (36.3)	7.8 (46.0)	10.2 (50.4)	−5.9 (21.4)
Average precipitation mm (inches)	193.2 (7.61)	197.8 (7.79)	164.5 (6.48)	59.3 (2.33)	24.4 (0.96)	8.7 (0.34)	4.0 (0.16)	3.8 (0.15)	17.9 (0.70)	46.3 (1.82)	112.2 (4.42)	165.0 (6.50)	997.1 (39.26)
Average precipitation days (≥ 0.1 mm)	11.1	11.2	12.0	9.5	6.8	3.8	2.3	1.2	2.3	5.7	8.7	10.8	85.4
Average relative humidity (%)	73.8	78.4	82.0	82.4	81.8	78.9	69.5	56.1	50.6	57.0	63.5	69.8	70.3
Mean monthly sunshine hours	201.5	169.5	148.8	126.0	114.7	114.0	161.2	198.4	168.0	164.3	177.0	182.9	1,926.3
Mean daily sunshine hours	6.5	6.0	4.8	4.2	3.7	3.8	5.2	6.4	5.6	5.3	5.9	5.9	5.3
Source: Servicio Meteorológico Nacional
