= General Mosconi, Salta =

General Mosconi (Salta)
- Municipality and town
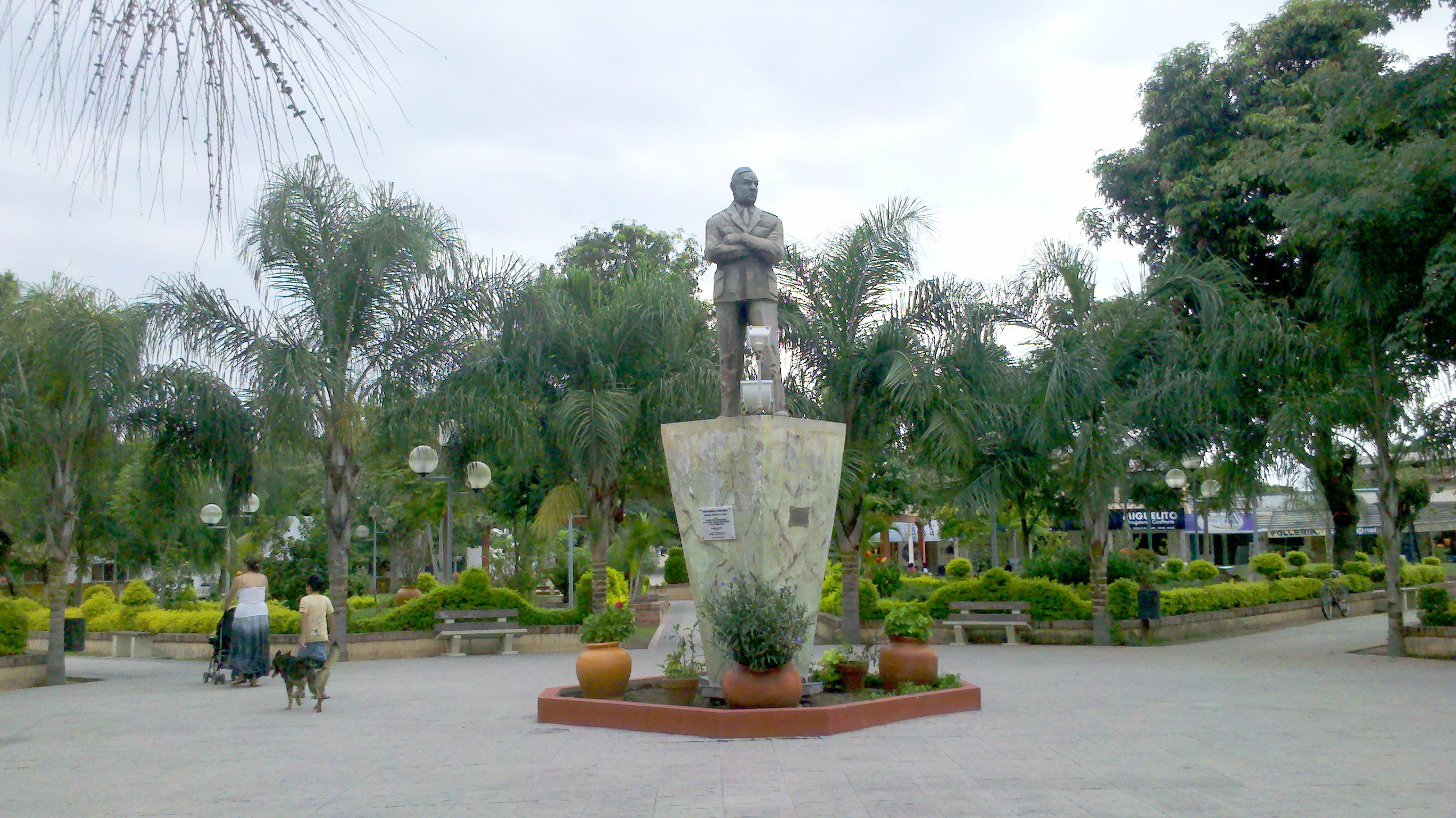
- General Mosconi's statue at central square

- Flag

- Location within Salta Province Location within Argentina
- Coordinates: 22°36′S 63°49′W
- Country: Argentina
- Province: Salta Province

Government
  - Intendant: Ana Guerrero (Freemen of the South Movement)
- Elevation: 1,483 ft (452 m)

Population (2001)
  - Total: 13,118
- Time zone: UTC−3 (ART)
- Postal code: 4562
- Area code: 03873

General Mosconi, usually known as Mosconi, is a town and municipality in Salta Province in northwestern Argentina.
