= Juan Manuel Canaveris =

Argentine jurist and politician

Captain Juan Manuel Canaveris

Personal details
- Born: May 10, 1804 Buenos Aires
- Died: May 2, 1868 (aged 63) Buenos Aires
- Resting place: Cementerio del Norte
- Party: Partido Federal (Lomo negro); Partido Blanco
- Spouse: Carmen Gutiérrez y Moxica
- Children: Ángel Canaveris; Emilia Canaveris; Haydée Canaveris; Prudencia Canaveris; Sara Canaveris; Samuel Canaveris; Axa Canaveris; Lia Canaveris
- Occupation: army attorney politician merchant education
- Profession: jurist military man teacher
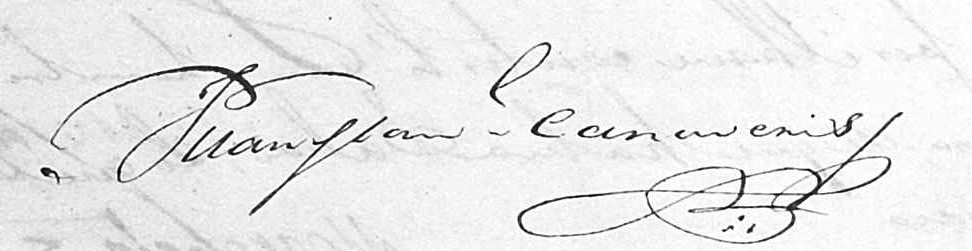
- Signature

Military service
- Allegiance: (Argentina) United Provinces of the River Plate; Argentine Confederation; Argentine Republic
- Branch/service: Argentine Army
- Years of service: 1819–1830
- Rank: Captain
- Commands: Regimiento de Húsares; Regimiento de Patricios
- Battles/wars: Argentine Civil Wars; Uruguayan Civil War

Juan Manuel Canaveris (May 10, 1804 – May 2, 1868) was an Argentine jurist and politician, who served in Buenos Aires and Montevideo as attorney, teacher and military man. He participated of the escort of honor in the funerals of Manuel Dorrego, and collaborated in the early days of government of Juan Manuel de Rosas.

He had an active participation as Procurador of the Argentine Nation, belonging to the moderate sector of the Federal Party linked to the political events that occurred during the Argentine and Uruguayan civil war.

== Military and political career ==
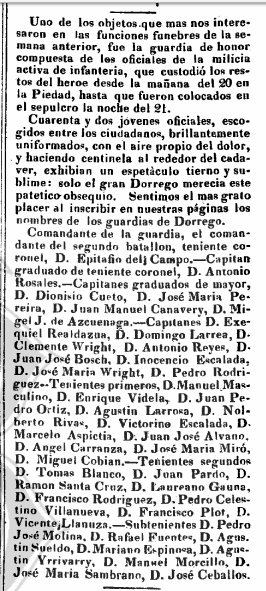
List of officers who participated in the Funeral Honors to the General Manuel Dorrego

He was born in Buenos Aires, son of José Canaveris and Agustina Denis, belonging to a traditional family. He made his secondary studies in the San Carlos College where he had as a partner Justo José de Urquiza. He probably studied at the University of Buenos Aires or Córdoba, where he received his law degree.

He was enlisted as a cadet in the Argentine Army in 1819, serving in the Regimiento Húsares de la Unión and Dragones Nueva Creacion. Two years later he was retired from active duty with a rank of Ensign. Time later he was reincorporated and promoted to Captain, serving in the procession that accompanied the remains of Manuel Dorrego to the Cemetery of Recoleta.

It is very likely that Juan Manuel Canaveris has taken part in the warlike conflicts between the armies of the Central Government of Buenos Aires and the Liga de los Pueblos Libres. His incorporation is mentioned in a letter written by the General José Rondeau to Ignacio Álvarez Thomas.

In 1830, he served as commander of the 2nd Regiment of Patricians of Buenos Aires. He also had a military involvement serving in the Montoneras, a paramilitary militia of the Federal party. He served as General Assistant of Juan Manuel de Rosas during the Cañuelas Pact with Juan Lavalle in 1829.

In 1832, he supported the government of Juan Ramón Balcarce, an opponent of Juan Manuel de Rosas. He belonged to the faction of the Federal party called as "Lomos Negros", a political group who opposed the granting of extraordinary powers to Rosas as governor of Buenos Aires.

Due to political issues Canaveris was forced into exile in Montevideo, where took part in meetings organized by Juan Bautista Alberdi and Valentín Alsina, about the French blockade of the Río de la Plata.

He also suffered political persecution during his exile in the Banda Oriental, including during the period of the Great Siege of Montevideo. He had been accused by the Gobierno de la Defensa, of trying to enter the ranks of the General Manuel Oribe, being degraded to the rank of soldado raso with destiny to the artillería de la plaza of the Fortaleza del Cerro in 1843.

He returned to Buenos Aires in 1849, living interchangeably between Montevideo and Buenos Aires until early 1860. As a supporter of the Uruguayan National Party, he opposed several Colorado leaders such as Melchor Pacheco y Obes and Joaquín Suárez, with whom he had a personal dispute.

== Other works ==
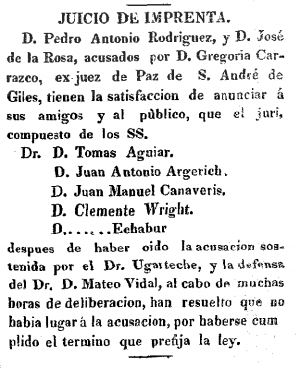
records with his services as a lawyer

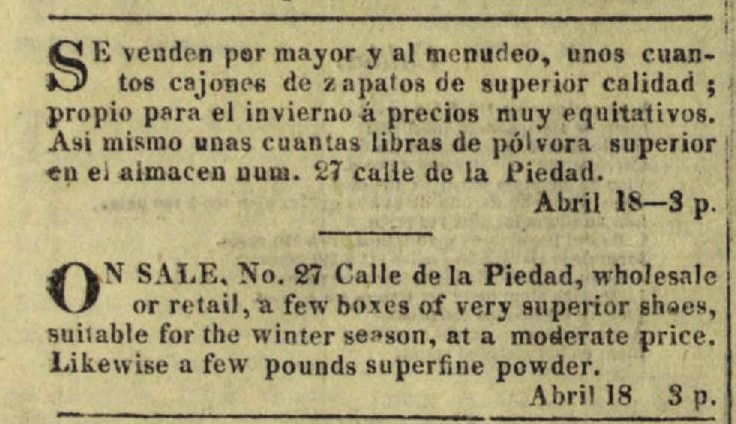
Sold in Calle de la Piedad No. 27

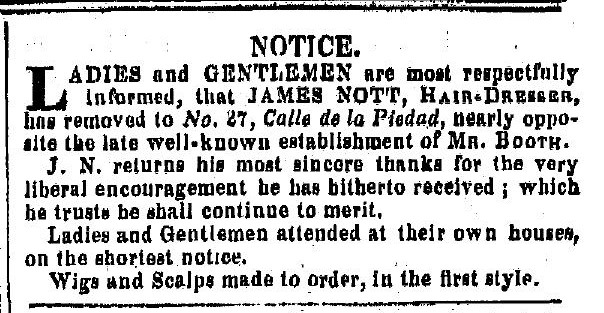
James Nott, No. 27, Calle de la Piedad

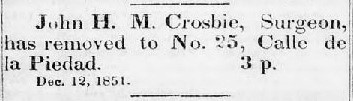
news of John H. M. Crosbie in the British Packet

His main activity in the territories of the Río de la Plata was as a criminal lawyer and fiscal of the city. In 1833, he was appointed alternate member of the jury responsible to guarantee press freedom in the republic. The jury was composed of leading figures of the time as Juan Martín de Pueyrredón, Miguel de Azcuénaga, Tomás de Anchorena and Luis Dorrego.

He was the author of Litis sobre un derecho de Tercería opuesto á la finca de propiedad de D. Antonio Maria Taboada, a book referring to a trial, published in the printing press of J. A. Bernheim in 1856.

He had a distinguished service at the beginning of primary education in the United Provinces of the Río de la Plata. He served as teaching assistant in the Escuela de la Piedad, an educational establishments located in the neighborhood of San Nicolás.

Juan Manuel Canaveris also was dedicated to trade and import, he had a warehouse in the Catedral street 153 (now San Martín). He maintained economic ties with Hodgson & Robinson Co, textile importers from Manchester in Buenos Aires. In 1826, he posted a notice in El Correo Nacional, offering for sale luxury shoes and several pounds of gunpowder.

His business was located in the vicinity of the imprenta of Esteban Hallet and the Faunch Hotel, the main English inn of the city, and where later was established the Bank of London and Río de la Plata.

He also dedicated himself to buying and selling land and renting properties, in 1826 he acquired hectares near the Salado River, current town of Bragado. He leased part of his property to several members of the Anglo-Argentine community of Buenos Aires, such as John Laing and Mathew Fouster, from Edinburgh and Dublin.

His property had been the lodging of various members of the British community since the late colonial period, including Florence "Macarte", an Irish Catholic, who served under the orders William Beresford, during the first English Invasion. In 1834 part of his property was rented to James Nott, a hairdresser of English or Irish origin. His house was also rented to a French citizen named Fortunato Girout, and to two Englishmen with surnames Matheson and Cornford, tenants between 1832 and 1834.

Its tenants also include Scottish Doctor John Herries Maxwell Crosbie, who had his office on Calle de la Piedad No. 25. This doctor who served attending to the wounded of the Battle of Caseros, had been hired by the government of Juan Manuel de Rosas in 1849.

Canaveris also was in charge of the financial aid of the children of María de los Ángeles Rodríguez Calderón de la Barca, widow of his uncle Manuel Canaveris, who died around 1826.

Among his jobs as an entrepreneur is his participation as a shareholder for the construction of the Solís Theatre of Montevideo, built by the Italian architect Carlo Zucchi in 1856.

He had a long legal dispute with his aunt Encarnación Canaveris, for the rights of the Lay Chaplaincy, inherited from their ancestors Leonor Esparza and Sebastiana Esparza y Cabral de Melo.

He traveled on business matters to various cities of Europe, including Genoa and Cádiz. He made numerous voyages aboard well-known ships, including Vapor Menay, Vapor Pampero and Goleta Sarda Fama.

== Family ==
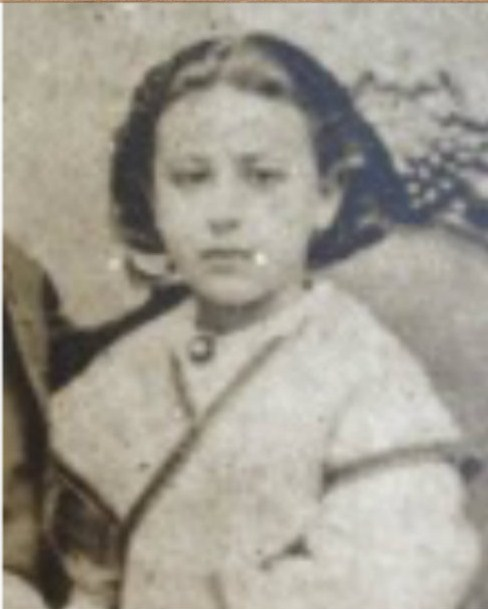
Carmen Canaveris Gutiérrez

Juan Manuel Canaveris married on August 21, 1842 in The Parish Church of St. Francis of Assisi, to María del Carmen Gutiérrez, born in Montevideo, daughter of Juan Gutiérrez and Lorenza Moxica. He and his wife were the parents of Samuel Canaveris, who served for many years as an employee of Casa de Moneda de la República Argentina, and was elected mayor of Río Gallegos in 1916 and 1917.

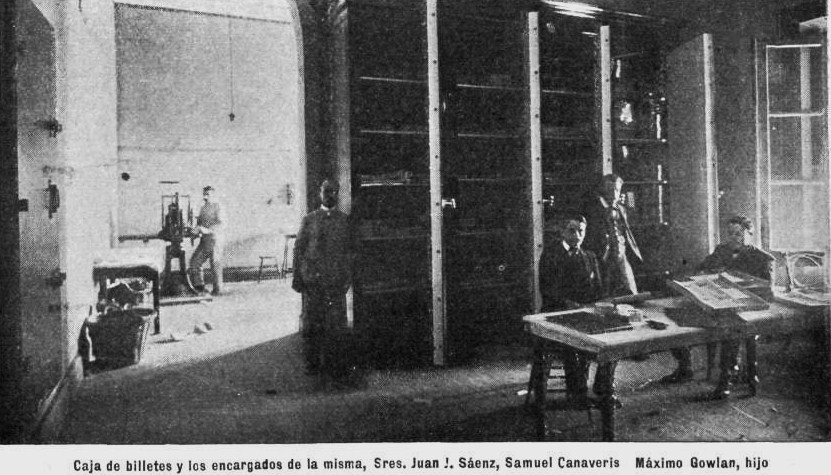
Juan Sáenz (left), Samuel Canaveris (standing), and Máximo Gowland (right), distinguished gentleman belonging to the Gowland family.

He was also the father of Ángel Canaveris Gutiérrez, a prestigious psychiatrist born in Genoa, who had a long career as head of public hospitals in the Banda Oriental. His daughter Axa Cristina Canaveris, was married to Pedro Acevedo, a grandson by maternal line of Vicente Anastasio Echevarría.

His daughter Sara Canaveris, who married Martín Bustos, was baptized as Toribia Prudencia del Corazón Canaveris, and her name was changed to Sara at the request of her godfather, English Enrique Dowse, who asked that his goddaughter bear that name in honoring his sister Sarah Dowse (born 1802 in London).

In Uruguay, the Canaveris Gutiérrez family were domiciled at No. 109 on Colón Street, Ciudad Vieja, Montevideo, and among his neighbors were Salvador María del Carril, exiled in the time of Rosas. He and his family lived for many years in his natal house, belonging to his paternal grandparents, located on Calle de la Piedad between the current Reconquista and 25 de Mayo, neighborhood of San Nicolás (Buenos Aires). This place was known as the "barrio Inglés" (English neighborhood), due to the large number of English-speaking citizens who settled in the area since 1810.

His birth house located at numbers 21, 27 and 29 was acquired in 1836 by Canaveris himself, through public auction to the heirs of Catalina Bernarda Esparza. Years later Canaveris sold that property to the Bayá family and built a new house at numbers 31 and 35 on the same street.

His house was in front of the Hotel Hibernia, an Irish establishment owned by John Geoghegan, that operated on Calle de la Piedad No. 26 from 1850. In this same area also operated a ticket sales agency of the Central Argentine Railway, located in Calle de la Piedad No. 35 (former property of the Canaveris family).

The children and descendants of the Canaveris Gutiérrez family studied at prestigious educational institutions such as Samuel Canaveris who did his secondary studies at the Seminario Anglo-Argentino, and tertiaries in Universidad de Buenos Aires. His grandson Carlos Manuel Canaveris, was a student in the Escuela de Maquinistas Navales directed by Carlos B. Massot. He carried out an improvement course in Barrow-in-Furness, (United Kingdom).

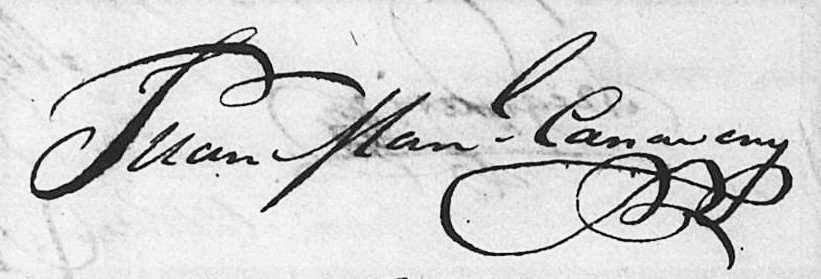
his alternate signature

Juan Manuel Canaveris also used the variant Canavery of his surname, permanently modifying it from 1835 when he began to sign as Canaveris. He died at the age of 64 on May 2, 1868, being witnesses Emilio Achinelly and Tomás Quincke. Possibly he was a descendant of Irish Catholic families emigrated to France and Northern Italy in the early or mid 17th century. His descendants were linked to families of Enrique Yateman, Juan José Viamonte and José Fornaguera.
