= Ángel Canavery =

Argentine military man

Lieutenant Colonel Ángel Canavery
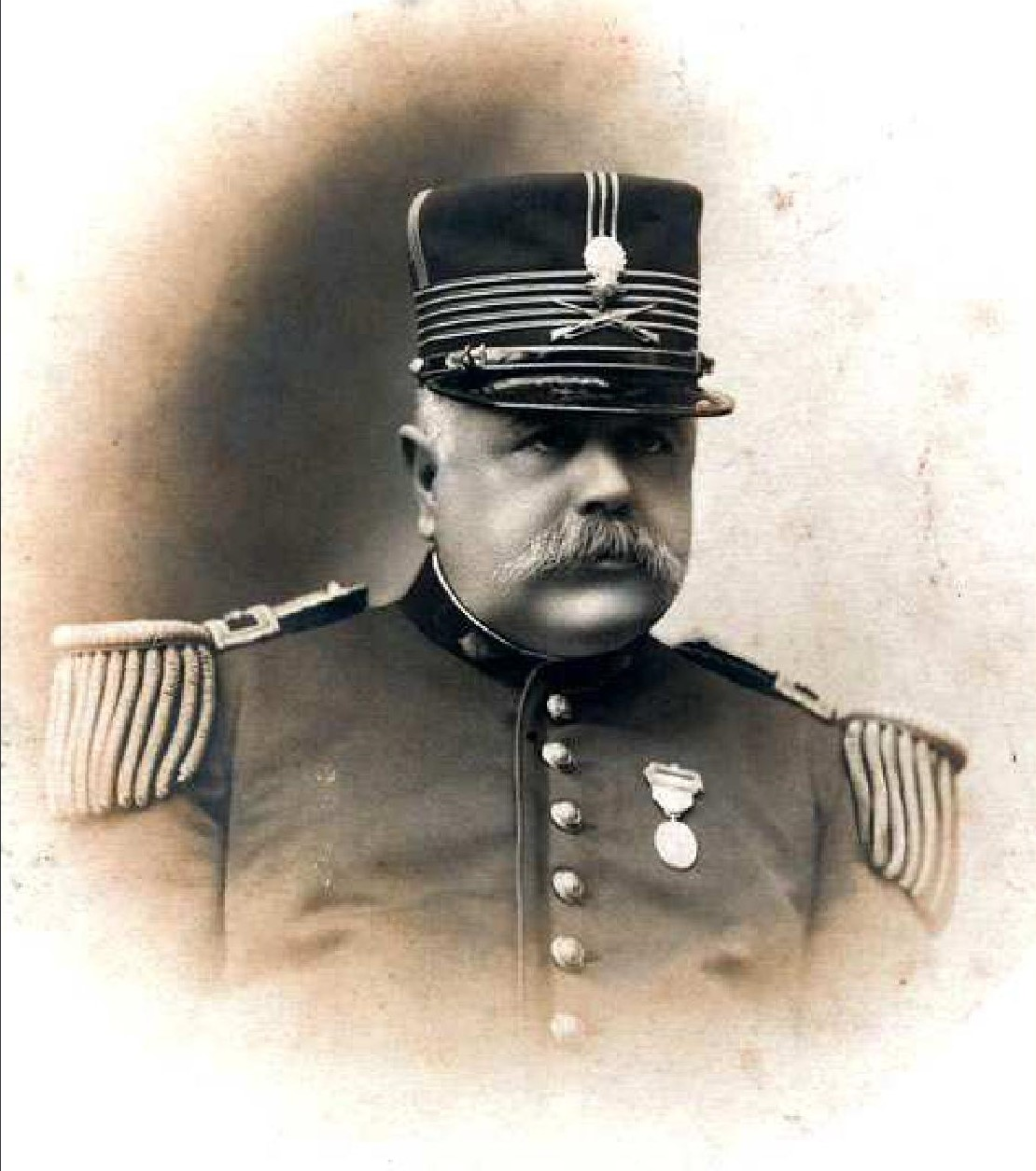
- Tcnel. Ángel Mateo Canavery

Agregado Militar in the Kingdom of Italy
- In office 1889–1890
- Preceded by: ?
- Succeeded by: ?

Jefe del Detall of the Estado Mayor General del Ejército
- In office 1897–1898
- Preceded by: ?
- Succeeded by: ?

Personal details
- Born: Ángel Mateo Canavery Castillo; 21 September 1850 Buenos Aires
- Died: 20 July 1916 (aged 65) Buenos Aires
- Resting place: Recoleta Cemetery
- Party: National Autonomist Party
- Spouse: Mercedes Montero Rondó
- Children: María Esther Canaveri (goddaughter)
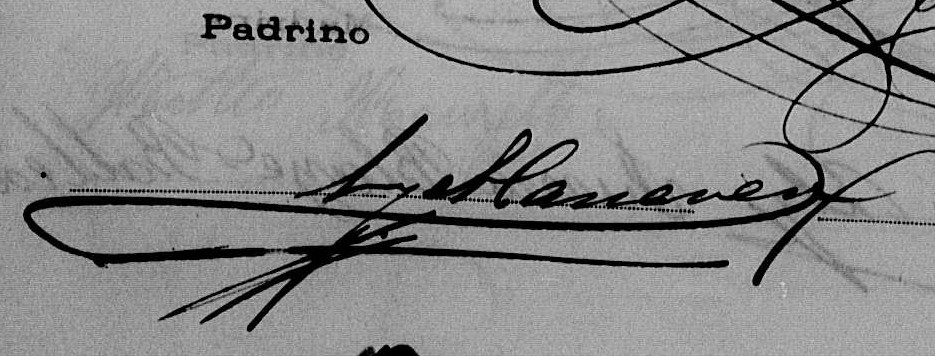
- Signature

Military service
- Allegiance: Argentina
- Branch/service: Argentine Army
- Years of service: 1870-1905
- Rank: Lieutenant colonel
- Unit: Regimiento de Infantería de Línea Nº 1
- Battles/wars: Jordanist Rebellion; Conquest of the Desert; Revolution of 1880; Revolution of the Park

Angel Mateo Canavery (1850–1916) was an Argentine military man, who participated in the Conquest of the Desert under the command of General Julio Argentino Roca. He also took part against the Montoneras of Ricardo López Jordán (Rebelión jordanista), and against Civic Union troops during the Revolution of the Park.

He performed administrative tasks in the Estado Mayor General del Ejército, and like military attache in the Italy during the presidency of Miguel Ángel Juárez Celman.

== Military career ==
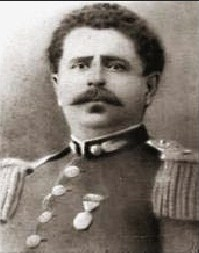
Ángel Mateo Canavery, c. 1880

He was born in Buenos Aires, the son of Tomás Canaverys and Macedonia Castillo, belonging to a distinguished family of French or Irish descent. He did his primary and secondary studies in the city, and began his military career as second lieutenant in the 8th Infantry Battalion, to the orders of Lieutenant colonel Tomas Elliot in 1873.

He participating in the end of the Campaign against Ricardo López Jordán in Entre Ríos. Later he served in the military Garrison of Mercedes, province of Buenos Aires. He was discharged from the army for personal reasons in 1875.

He was reincorporated into the ranks of the army in 1876, serving in the Fuerte General Lavalle (current General Pinto) and Puan. In 1877, with the rank of first lieutenant, he served in the 1st Line Regiment, under orders of Teodoro García and Julio Argentino Roca.

During the military expeditions he participated in the assault on the tribes of Catriel in "Treyco Grande" (La Pampa), and in the operations against the tribe of Namuncura in Chiloé (La Pampa). Later he took part in the Battle of Hucal Grande against the tribes of Cañumil and Huenchuquil (occurred in 1878).

He took part in the military actions of 6 and 7 December 1878, in which the Argentine Army confronted the tribe of Namuncura in Lihué Calel. In 1879 he provide services in the garrison of Choele Choel and participates in the actions commanded by Gral. Roca, on the banks of the Río Negro. That same year he fell ill from a gallbladder condition, being cured by a female healer who had also attended General Teodoro García in Puan.

He maintained a respectful deal with Aboriginal leaders who participated in the Conquest of the Desert, and also with the main Caciques who fought against the Army troops during the Military Campaigns. According to some historians, Canavery would have been honored by chief Catriel with a poncho.

After finishing his services in the Argentine south, Ángel Canavery returned to Buenos Aires, being promoted to captain on 1 April 1880. A year later he served in Salta to the orders of Colonel García, until 5 June 1882. That same year Canavery provides services in the Infantry Inspection, being promoted to major in 1886, and appointed as Military attaché from Italy in 1889. Returning to Argentina a year later, he was promoted to lieutenant colonel in August 1890, serving in the Estado Mayor del Ejército.

Between 1892 and 1895, Canavery was in charge of the military detachment of Santa Catalina and served as commander of the detachments of Córdoba and San Luis until 1900. In 1896, he went on to serve in the Plana Mayor Activa.

He also intervened in civil-military conflicts in Argentina, including the Revolution of 1880 and Revolution of the Park, taking part in the main actions against the revolutionary troops. He was appointed Jefe of Detall in charge of the office of the 1st. Argentine Army Corps in 1897 by decree of the then President José Evaristo Uriburu.

Until the middle of the 19th century the troops of the Argentine army had used sabers and spears, and rifles of a single shot. In 1879, the officers and soldiers of the army were equipped with modern weapons that included Remington rifles, Carbines and Lefaucheux pistols, used by Canavery during his military career.

He attended numerous meetings of the local aristocracy, including the held in the Circulo Militar in honor to General José Ignacio Garmendia. He was a member of the Club del Progreso, the first gentlemen's club in South America.

Ángel Canavery retired from the army in 1905 after serving thirty-five years of active service.

== Family ==
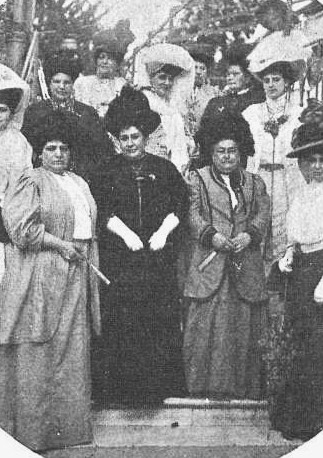
Mercedes Montero (centre)

Ángel Canavery was married on 3 April 1880 in the parish Basílica Nuestra Señora del Pilar to Mercedes Montero, daughter of Apolinario Montero and Julia Rondó Castillo, members of a distinguished family related to José Rondeau. His wife was related to Martín Matheu Diana and Rufina Rondó Castillo, belonging to the families of Juan Bautista Rondeau and Domingo Matheu.

She had an active participation in the charitable activities of Buenos Aires, serving as president of Sociedad Protectora de Huérfanos de Militares, an association founded on 12 July 1891.

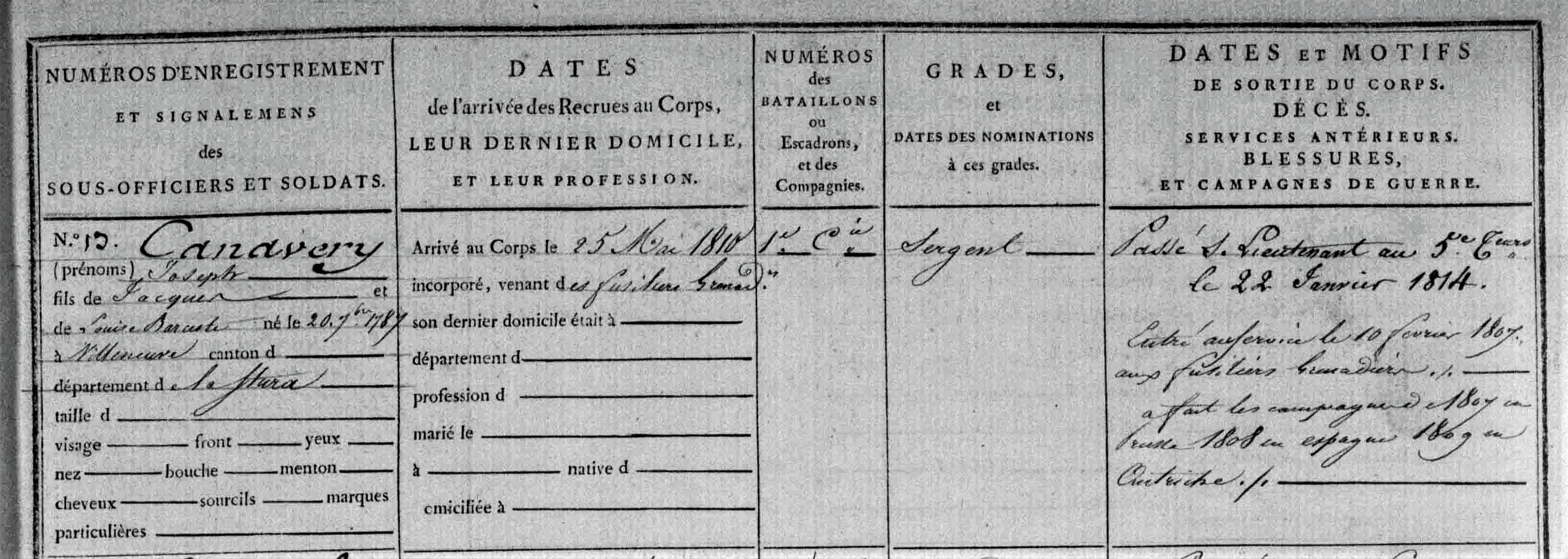
Lt. Joseph Canavery, grenadier of the Garde impériale française.

He had several brothers including, the Colonel Tomás Canavery, a hero of the Battle of Lomas Valentinas during the Paraguayan War. His nephew was General Enrique Mosconi Canavery, who had a brief stint in the German Army serving in the 10th Battalion of Westphalia. A great-granddaughter of his sister Juana María Canavery, was married to a descendant of Luis Vernet, governor of the Islas Malvinas in 1830.

A large part of Angel Canavery's relatives served in the ranks of the army, taking part during the English invasions, the War of Independence, the Argentine and Uruguayan Civil War and the Military Expeditions against the indigenous incursions.

His paternal grandfather Mariano Canaverys, whose father (Juan Canaverys) participated in the May Revolution, was a teacher who served as lieutenant of the 1st squadron of Hussars of Pueyrredón, having an active participation in the defense of Buenos Aires during the English invasions. Outside of Argentina in North Italy and South France there are some records about members of the Canavery family associated with military campaigns, including the services rendered to the French Army during the Napoleonic period by Joseph Canavery, born in Stura, Piedmont, who served as a rifleman of the Battalion Vélites of Turin.

He was a colleague of distinguished Argentine officers with whom he participated in various military campaigns, including Carlos O'Donnell, Carlos Smith, Francisco Smith, Lorenzo Tock and Augusto Rouquaud. In 1902, he attended the funeral of Juan de Dios Rawson, a lieutenant colonel who participated in the Paraguayan War.

Canavery and his wife did not have children, but were the godfathers of baptism of María Esther Canaveri, daughter of his relatives Saturnino Canaveri and Carmen Canavery. His wife was godmother of María Cristina Mercedes Gorchs y Mosconi, baptized on 23 July 1899.

In 1906 the national government authorized retired Lieutenant Colonel Ángel Canavery permission to make a trip to Europe. He possibly traveled with his wife to Marseille or Genoa.

Ángel Mateo Canavery Castillo died on 20 July 1916 in Buenos Aires. His wife Mercedes Montero in the same city in 1930.

== Link ==
- Bautismos 1837-1859
- Matrimonios 1872-1882
