= Canavery =

Canavery may refer to:

- Ángel Canavery (1850–1916), Argentine lieutenant colonel during the Conquest of the Desert campaign
- Saturnino Canavery (1854–1939), Argentine lieutenant colonel during the Conquest of the Desert campaign
- Tomás Canavery (1839–1913), Argentine Catholic priest and military chaplain
- Zoilo Canavery (1893–1966), Uruguayan-born Argentine amateur football player

== See also ==
- Canaveri (disambiguation)
- Canaverys (disambiguation)
