= Vicente Anastasio Echevarría =

Argentinian diplomat (1768–1857)

Vicente Anastasio de Echevarría
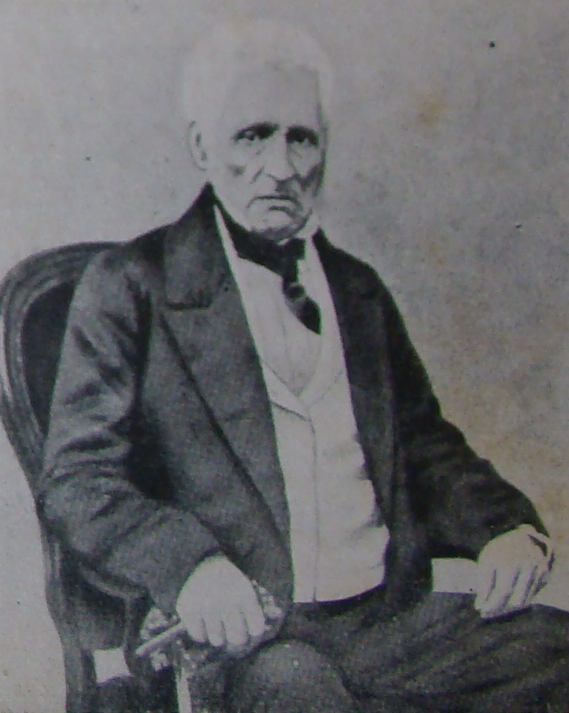

Secretary of the Assembly of the Year XIII
- In office 1813–1813

Minister of the Royal Audiencia of Buenos Aires
- In office 1810–1811

Personal details
- Born: Vicente Anastasio de Echevarría y Acevedo; January 22, 1768 Rosario, Argentina
- Died: August 20, 1857 (aged 89) Buenos Aires, Argentina
- Resting place: La Recoleta Cemetery
- Spouse: María Antonia de Echevarría y Ramos
- Occupation: politician government diplomatic laws
- Profession: attorney
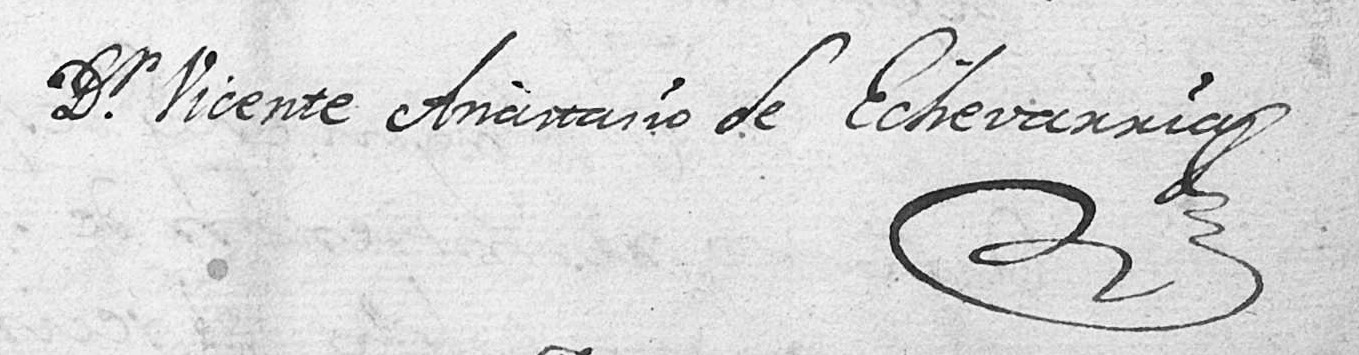
- Signature

Military service
- Allegiance: Spain – until 1810 (Argentina) United Provinces of the River Plate
- Branch/service: Milicias criollas
- Years of service: 1806–1810
- Commands: Húsares of Pueyrredón
- Battles/wars: British invasions of the Río de la Plata; May Revolution

Vicente Anastasio Echevarría (January 22, 1768 – August 20, 1857) was an Argentine lawyer and politician who served as Minister of the Real Audiencia de Buenos Aires. He had an active participation in the events that occurred during the Invasiones Inglesas and the Revolución de Mayo. He held various honorary positions, including as secretario of the Asamblea del Año XIII.

== Biography ==
He was born in Rosario, Santa Fe, the son of Fermín de Echevarría, born in Álava, and Tomasa de Acevedo, a distinguished Creole lady from San Nicolás de los Arroyos. He was married to his relative María Antonia de Echevarría, daughter of José de Echevarría and María Francisca Ramos. He studied at the College of San Carlos, and earned his law degree from University of Charcas. He took an active part in the defense of Buenos Aires during the English invasions of 1806 and 1807, and served as secretary of Santiago de Liniers during his administration as viceroy.

He was also involved in the movements of the May Revolution of 1810, taking part in that event as one of the lobbyists who voted for the removal Baltasar Hidalgo de Cisneros, as viceroy of the Río de la Plata. In 1811 he was sent in diplomatic mission to Asunción with his personal friend Manuel Belgrano, to negotiate relations between the United Provinces of the River Plate and Paraguayan government. In 1812 Echevarría was appointed as Comisario de guerra of the First Triumvirate. And in 1814 served as State councilor.

Towards the end of his life he dedicated himself to commercial activities, also serving as a lawyer for distinguished gentlemen of the time, like Juan Manuel Canaveris, whose daughter was related to one of his descendants.
