= Canaverys =

Canaverys may refer to:

- Joaquín Canaverys (1789–1840?), Argentine government official in the Cabildo.
- Juan Canaverys (1748–1822), Italian notary and functionary, or official, for the viceroyalty of Río de la Plata
- José Canaverys (1780–1837), Argentine Soldier, Notary, Prosecutor and Accountant
- Manuel Canaverys (1787–1830), Argentine army officer, Lieutenant in the Regiment of Patricians

== See also ==
- Canavery (disambiguation)
