= Faunch Hotel =

Hotel in Buenos Aires, Argentina

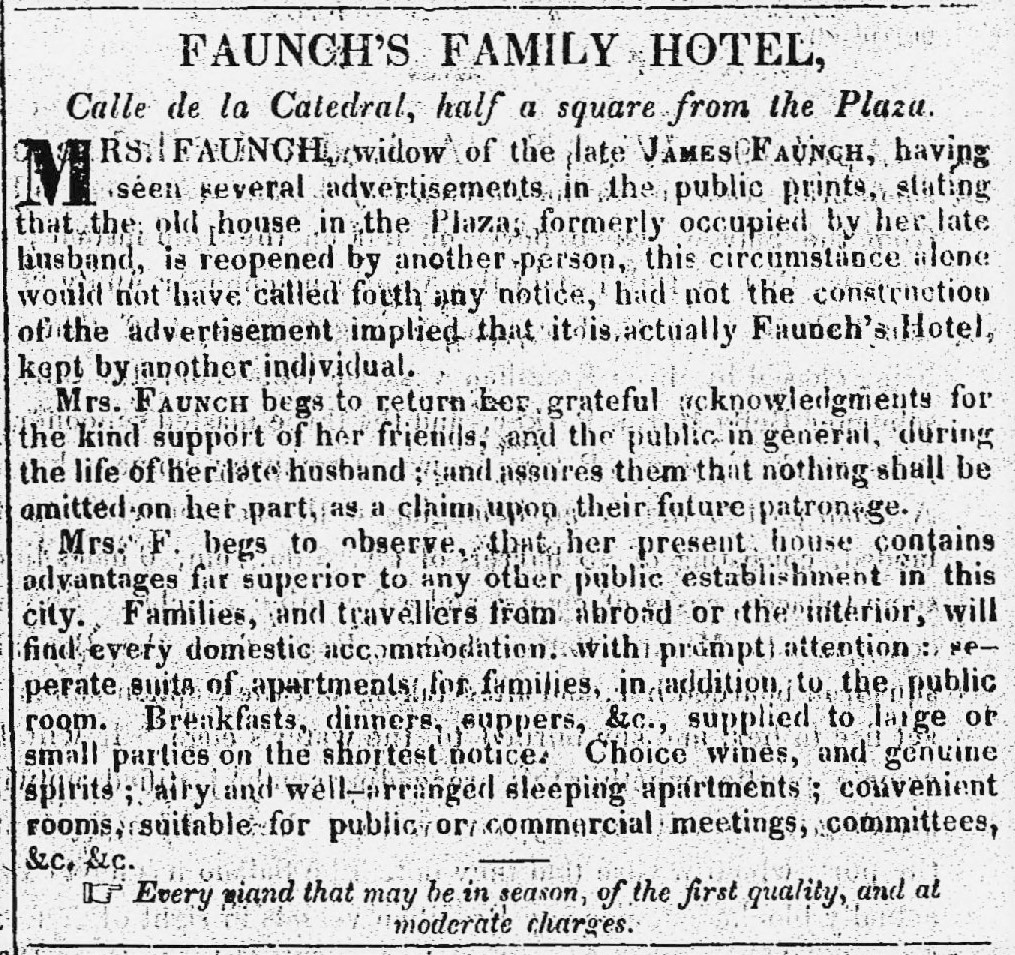
- notice of the Faunch Hotel

General information
- Location: San Nicolás, Buenos Aires, Argentina
- Inaugurated: 1817
- Closed: c. 1840

Design and construction
- Architect: Joseph Thwaites.

The Faunch Hotel was a prestigious English hotel, is considered one of the most famous in Buenos Aires during the first half of the 19th century.

== Story ==
The Faunch's was built by James Faunch and Mary Faunch, a couple of British immigrants, established in the city of Buenos Aires towards the beginning of the 19th century. The hotel was opened in 1817, located on La Plata street, (now Rivadavia) and Santo Cristo (now 25 de Mayo). Had two floors, and a capacity for eighty people.

Several famous musicians of the time performed their concerts In the Hotel de Faunch, including the French violinist Amadeo Gras. This hotel also served as a lodging for the British Consul Sir Woodbine Parish, and the Irish Admiral William Brown, considered the father of the Argentine Navy.

Another of the main hostels of British residents in Buenos Aires was the Hotel de Smith and Hotel de Keen, administered by English immigrants, and the "Fonda de Doña Clara", a famous tavern owned by the English Mary Clark, located on Calle 25 de Mayo, between Piedad and Cangallo.

Although administered by an Italian the Fonda de los Tres Reyes, was the meeting place for English and American travelers. In 1850 John Geoghegan, a native of Westmeath, installed the Hibernian Hotel on Calle de la Piedad No. 26, between the current 25 de Mayo and Leandro N. Alem.

James Faunch dies in 1827. His widow administered the hotel until 1833, year in which she decides to sell him to dining-room manager, John Quenby Beech, born in Ireland.
