= Saint Francis Xavier Church of Ramallo =

Church in Ramallo, Argentina

- Parroquia San Francisco Javier de Ramallo
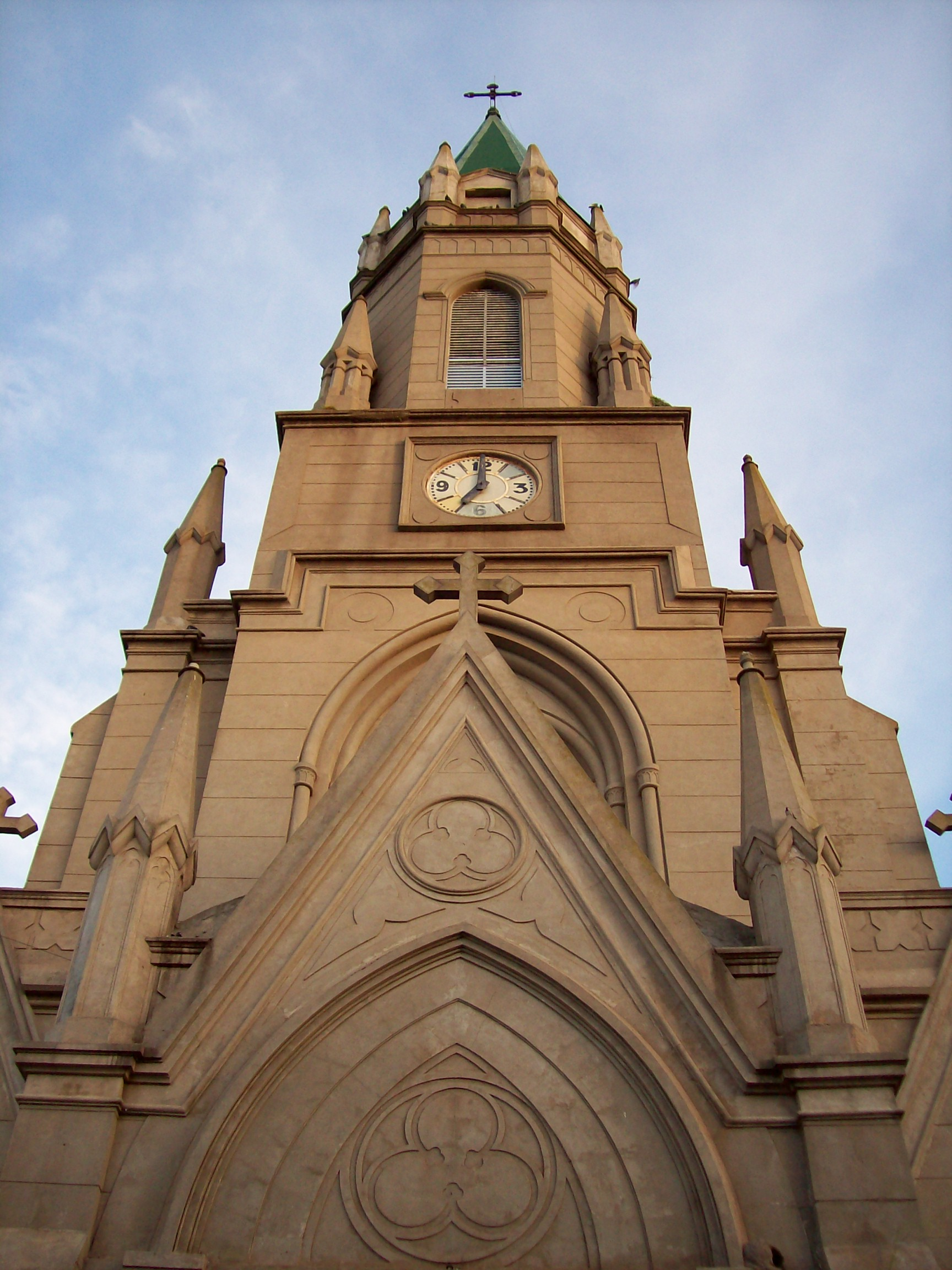
- facade of the parish of San Francisco

Religion
- Affiliation: Roman Catholic
- Diocese: Buenos Aires Province
- Rite: Catholic
- Patron: St Francis Xavier

Location
- Location: Moreno 965, Ramallo
- Municipality: Ramallo
- Territory: Argentina

Architecture
- Style: neo-gothic
- Established: 1878
- Completed: 1929

Saint Francis Xavier Church of Ramallo (in Spanish: Parroquia San Francisco Javier) is an Argentine Catholic church located in the town of Ramallo, province of Buenos Aires.

== History ==
The parish of Ramallo was inaugurated on February 18, 1878, being appointed to the post of Vicar priest Domingo Tomatis, of the order of the Salesians. Originally this church was erected to house the rural community of the area, being also the church of the Irish Catholics, who had settled in the northern towns of the province of Buenos Aires since 1840.

The current construction of the church began in 1902, and was completed in 1929. Among his priests who served in the parish are Tomás Canavery, who served as vicar general between 1881 and 1892, and Edmund Flannery (born in 1840 in County Cork, Ireland), priest who was entrusted to attend the Irish community of the parish.

== Gallery ==
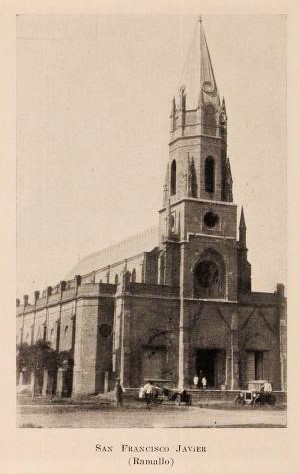
old photo of the parish church of Ramallo.

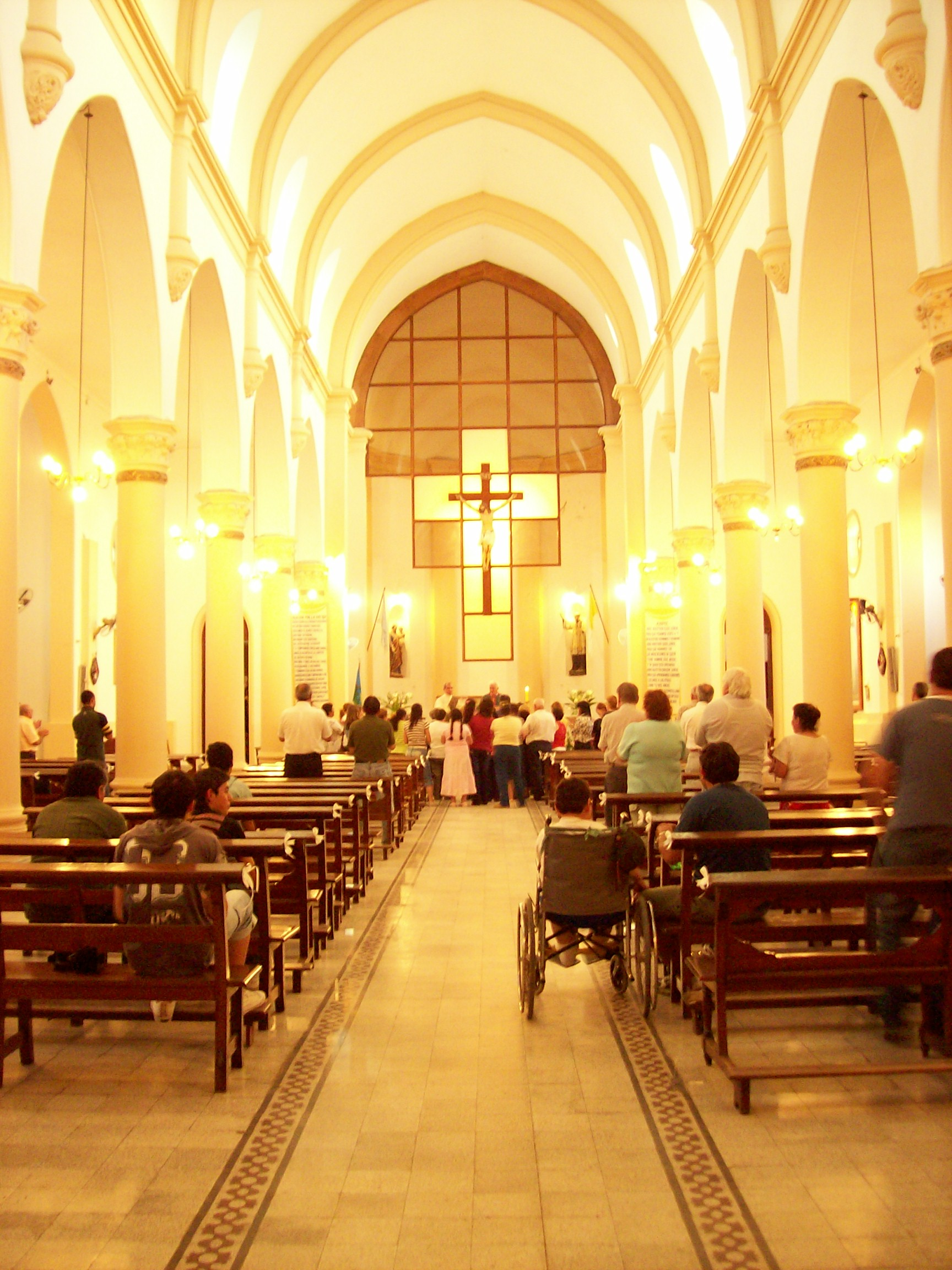
inside view of the church San Francisco Javier Parish of Ramallo.
