= Fonda de los Tres Reyes =

Restaurant information
- Established: c.1800
- Closed: April 20, 1830
- Owner: Juan Bonfillo
- Location: Buenos Aires, Argentina

Fonda de los Tres Reyes was an Inn or Tavern that worked in Buenos Aires in the late 18th century and early 19th. It was the main hotel and restaurant in the city, located in the neighborhood of San Nicolás, populated around 1810 by a considerable number of British and American immigrants.

== History ==
The establishment was owned by Juan Bonfillo, a Genoese merchant, who had arrived in the port of Buenos Aires in 1790. Bonfiglio had bought the inn in 1802 to a family of Prieto name, Its facilities were located in the street Santo Cristo (current 25 de Mayo) facing the Plaza Mayor, and in the vicinity of Fuerte de Buenos Aires.

Among his major clients were William Brown and James Florence Burke from Ireland, and some members of Lautaro Lodge.

During the first British invasion of the River Plate, La Fonda de los Tres Reyes was place of lodging of William Beresford and his officers.

La Fonda de los Tres Reyes was the most exclusive restaurant and hotel in Buenos Aires in the 1800s. This business was in front of the La fonda de Doña Clara, an inn administered by its owner, the English lady Mary Clark.

== Notable clients ==
- Hipólito Vieytes (1762–1815) Argentine politician
- Juan José Paso (1758–1833) Argentine lawyer and politician
- Nicolás Rodríguez Peña (1773–1853) Argentine politician
- Manuel Belgrano (1770–1820) Argentine statesman
- José de San Martín (1778–1850) Argentine patriot.
- Guillermo Brown (1777–1857) Irish Admiral.
