= José Alejandro Bernheim =

French journalist (1822–1893)

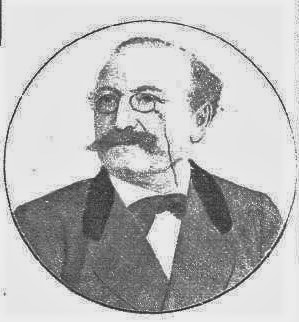

Personal details
- Born: Joseph Alexandre Bernheim; 22 January 1822 Mulhouse, France
- Died: 1 September 1893 (aged 71) Buenos Aires, Argentina
- Spouse: Sofia Justina Spangenberg
- Occupation: Journalist
- Profession: Typographer

José Alejandro Bernheim (22 January 1822 – 1 September 1893) was a French journalist of Jewish origin. He served as typographer of the Ejército Grande under the command of Justo José de Urquiza.

== Biography ==
Bernheim was born in Mulhouse, Alsace (France). After completing his elementary studies, he moved to Strasbourg where serve in the newspaper Courier du Bas-Rhin. In 1850, he arrived at the port of Montevideo and then settled in Buenos Aires where he opened a printing press on the Calle Defensa (neighborhood of San Nicolás). His business was specially dedicated to French and English language publications, and aimed at members of those communities established in Buenos Aires.

José Alejandro Bernheim founded the newspapers La República and Le Courrier de la Plata, published for the French community of Buenos Aires. In his printing office were made of the bulletins of war written by Domingo Faustino Sarmiento, a complete version of his works in tribute to the Argentine statesman.
