= Tomás Canavery =

Argentine Catholic priest and military chaplain

Father Tomás Onésimo Canavery
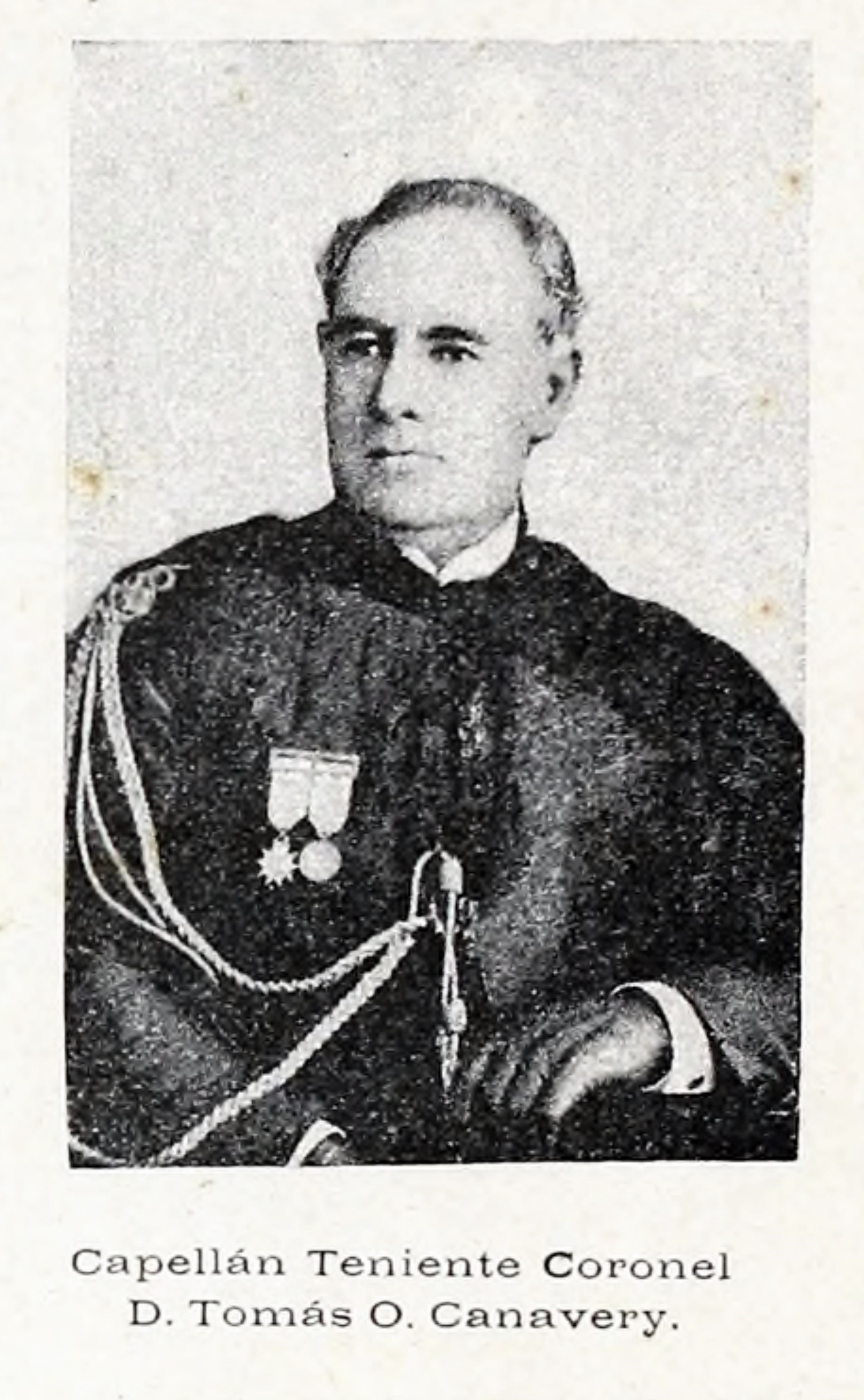

Chaplain of Villa Occidental
- In office 1870–1878
- Succeeded by: José Pablo Lynch

Vicar of the Parish Nuestra Señora del Tránsito of Ministro Rivadavia
- In office 1877–1878
- Preceded by: ?
- Succeeded by: ?

Vicar of the Our Lady of Carmen Parish of Benito Juárez
- In office 1880–1881
- Succeeded by: Antonio Espiño

Vicar of the Saint Francis Xavier Church of Ramallo
- In office 1881–1892
- Preceded by: Domingo Tomatis
- Succeeded by: Manuel Lamas

Personal details
- Born: Tomás Onésimo Canavery Castillo; February 14, 1839 Buenos Aires
- Died: September 13, 1913 (aged 74) Buenos Aires
- Resting place: La Recoleta Cemetery
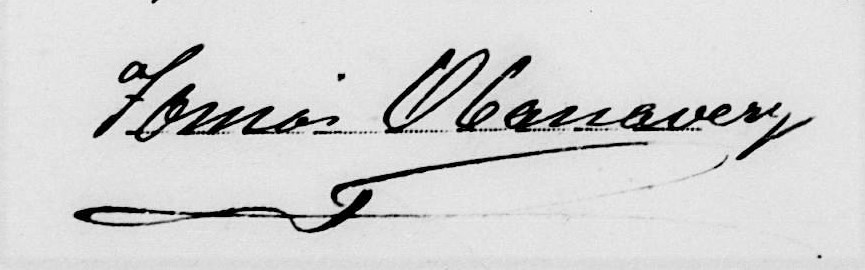
- Signature

Military service
- Allegiance: Argentine
- Branch/service: Argentine Army
- Years of service: 1852-1870
- Rank: Lieutenant colonel
- Battles/wars: Battle of Caseros; Revolution of 11 September 1852; War of the Triple Alliance

Tomás Onésimo Canavery (1839–1913) was an Argentine Catholic priest and military chaplain, who served under the command of Bartolomé Mitre during the War of the Triple Alliance. He participated in most of the military actions against the Paraguayan forces, being promoted to lieutenant colonel in the same battlefield by order of General Juan Andrés Gelly y Obes.

He had a long career as a parish priest of the Province of Buenos Aires, serving in the curacy of Almirante Brown, Arrecifes, Benito Juárez, Moreno, Ramallo and others.

== Biography ==
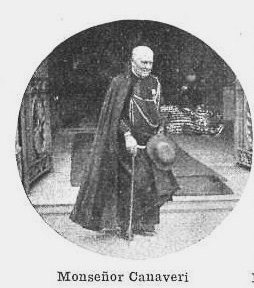
Tomás Canavery in 1908, during a tribute to the fallen of the War of Paraguay

Tomás Canavery was born in Buenos Aires, the son of Tomás Canaverys and Macedonia Castillo, belonging to a distinguished family of the city. He did his elementary studies in Buenos Aires, and was ordained as priest in the seminary of San Lorenzo.

He started his military career being almost a child. At the age of 13, he participated in the Battle of Caseros, as sub-lieutenant, and was among the defenders of the city, during the conflict of September 11, 1852, between Buenos Aires Province and the Argentine Confederation.

He left the habits for a brief period and entered the Conciliar Seminary of Buenos Aires in 1860. He served as a military chaplain during the Paraguayan War, and for his heroic behavior was promoted to Lieutenant Colonel. Canavery was present at the battles of Yatay, Battle of Tuyutí, Battle of Curupayty and Battle of Lomas Valentinas, occurred on December 27, 1868. Finished the war he was added to troops who occupied the city of Asunción. He was the first Chaplain who served in Villa Occidental, being replaced in the position by José Pablo Lynch y Cabrera.

He was the most prominent member of the Canaverys family in the Río de la Plata. He was awarded the following medals: commemorative for the taking of Uruguaiana; cordon of Tuyutí; shield of Curupayty; star of Guardia Nacional of Buenos Aires Province. And the crosses granted by the Brazilian and Uruguayan government.

He served as the Governor's Chaplain in the Gran Chaco, which also included territories of Formosa and Paraguay. In 1897 he obtained his retirement from the Argentine army by decree of the then President José Evaristo Uriburu.

In 1880, Tomás Canavery served as chaplain in the Penitenciaría Nacional of Buenos Aires, and also served as parish priest in the village of Benito Juárez. He was holder in the municipalidad of Ramallo, city where he also served as priest in the Saint Francis Xavier Church of Ramallo.

He was also dedicated to teaching. He served as preceptor of elementary school in the towns of Ramallo and Ministro Rivadavia (Greater Buenos Aires), being also the priest of the Parish Nuestra Señora del Tránsito of that locality in 1877.

Tomás Canavery took part in several national events, such as the installation of the railways in 1857. He also attended the inauguration of the Ramallo Railway Station of the Central Argentine Railway in 1886, and supported the privatization of the railways in 1890. His last public appearances were in 1908 when he attended the tributes celebrated to veterans of the Paraguayan War in the Recoleta Cemetery, and during the Centenary of the May Revolution in 1910.

A street of the district of Nuñez, Autonomous City of Buenos Aires is named in his honor. In the city of Ramallo there is a school named Escuela Nº5 Capellan Cnel. Tomás O. Canavery.

== Family ==
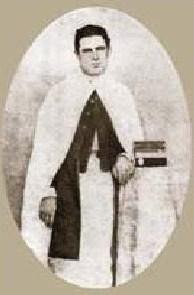
Tomás O. Canavery c.1860

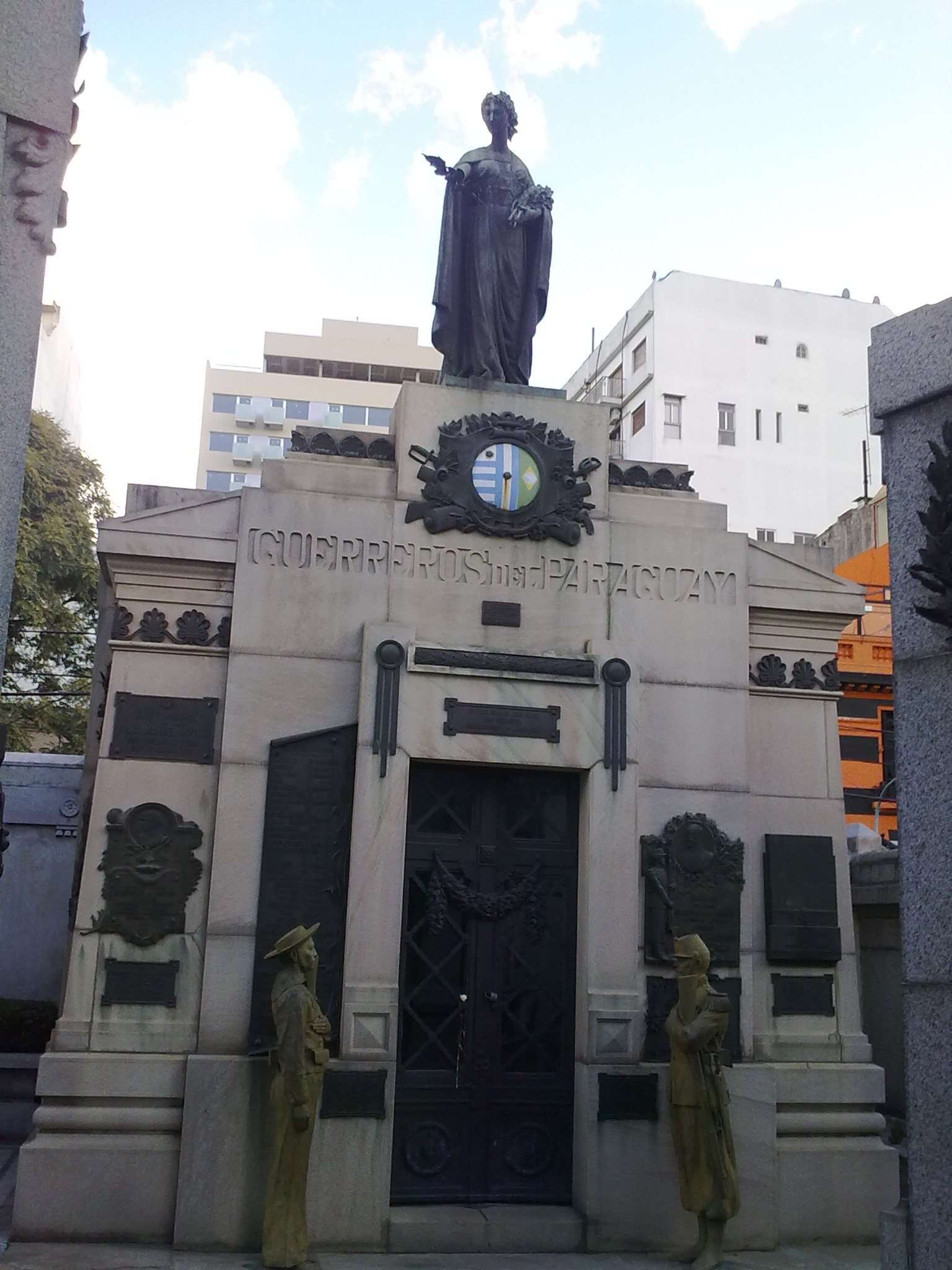
Pantheon of the warriors of Paraguay - La Recoleta Cemetery

Tomás Onésimo Canavery was baptized on September 2, 1839, in the parish of San Miguel Arcángel, son of Tomás José Canaverys and Macedonia Castillo, a Creole woman related to Juan Bautista Rondeau. His father Tomás, was baptized with that name for being born on December 29 (St Thomas's Day). He was a direct descendant of Juan Canaverys (1748-1822), an employee of the Court of Auditors of Buenos Aires during the Viceroyalty of the Río de la Plata, and one of the neighbors that attended the open cabildo of 22 of May 1810.

He had several brothers, including Ángel Canavery (1850-1916), a military man who participated in the Conquest of the Desert. His sister María Juana Canavery, was married to Enrico Mosconi, an engineer born in Milán, who had been hired by the government for the construction of Central Argentine Railway. Enrico and María Juana were the parents of Enrique Mosconi, a prestigious military and engineer, first President of the Yacimientos Petrolíferos Fiscales, the main oil company of Argentina. Another brother of his was Justino Canavery, who was registered in the census of 1855 along with several members of the Rondeau family.

His grandparents were Mariano Canaverys and Tiburcia Sosa Ravelo, belonging to a Creole family of Buenos Aires, Caparica and San Juan Province. His grandfather was tutor in Escuela de la Piedad, a primary school located in the neighborhood of San Nicolás. He and his wife also had opened a private school for boys and girls in the towns of Olivos. Like all schoolmasters of the time, Mariano was instructed by James Diego Thompson, who had arrived in Buenos Aires to apply modern techniques of education created by Joseph Lancaster.

Tomás Canavery was linked to the family of Rafael Macedo Ferreyra, a politician who was murdered by the Mazorca in 1842. He attended as a sponsor at the wedding of his parents, and at the baptism of his uncle Rafael Canavery.

Among his cousins were prominent jurists, military men and also musicians like Carlos Canaveris, a pianist and guitarist, who had participated in musical ensembles with Ernesto Ponzio, and Isabel Cecilia Canavery (1881-1945), the author of the poem El cardo azul, recorded by Carlos Gardel and José Razzano for the label Odeon Records.

Although his paternal surname is not of Irish origin, it is possible that some of his paternal ancestors were of French-Irish roots. Tomás Canavery was the priest who conducted the wedding of Juan Emiliano O'Leary (Juan O'Leary's father) and Dolores Urdapilleta, an event celebrated on February 3, 1870, in Villa Hayes. He also served as parish priest for the Irish community established in Ramallo.

He was a personal friend to Bartolomé Mitre, President of Argentina from 1862 to 1868, and Ricardo Gutiérrez, distinguished medical doctor. He also was friends with Cornelio Casablanca, a relative in law, who served as Manager of the Spanish Bank of the Rio de la Plata.

Tomás Canavery died on September 13, 1913, and his remains were deposited in the pantheon of the warriors of Paraguay in the Cementerio de la Recoleta.
