= Hussars of Pueyrredón =

- Húsares de Pueyrredón
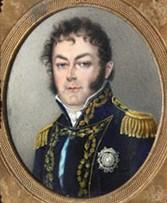
- portrait of Juan Martín de Pueyrredón
- Country: Argentina
- Allegiance: Spanish Empire - until 1810 (Argentina) United Provinces of the River Plate
- Branch: Argentine Army
- Type: Cavalry
- Engagements: Battle of Perdriel; Battle of San Pedro; May Revolution; Battle of Cotagaita; Battle of Huaqui; Battle of Salta

Hussars of Pueyrredón also known as Escuadrón de Húsares de Pueyrredón, was a unit of cavalry militia of Buenos Aires, created after the first English Invasion to the Río de la Plata. This corps of militias had an active participation during the Argentine War of Independence.

== History ==
The hussars of Pueyrredón owes its name to Juan Martín de Pueyrredón, who was in charge of recruiting volunteers during the first British invasion of the Río de la Plata. Pueyrredon belonged to a family of French and Irish descent, maternal grandson of Dionis O'Duggan, an Irish officer who served in the Spanish armies.

Members of this squadron participated in the Battle of Perdriel, against the troops of William Beresford. The Escuadrón de Húsares de Pueyrredón was officially created on August 14, 1806, it was composed of three cavalry squadrons commanded by Juan Martín Pueyrredón, Lucas Vivas (2° Escuadrón) and Pedro Ramón Núñez (3° Escuadrón). A few months later, a fourth squad was formed under Captain Diego Herrera (Escuadrón de Cazadores de la Reina).

During the second English invasion the 3rd squadron of Hussars was sent to the Banda Oriental as reinforcement of the troops of Francisco Javier de Elio against Denis Pack.

The 1st squadron was commanded by Pueyrredon and Martín Rodríguez, and among its officers was the Lieutenant Domingo French and Lt. Mariano Canaverys, the grandfather of Ángel Canavery and Tomás Canavery, lieutenant colonels of the Argentine Army.

After the May Revolution the squadron was renamed as Húsares de la Patria, Húsares de la Unión and Húsares de Buenos Aires, taking an active part in the cause of Argentine emancipation..

== Gallery ==
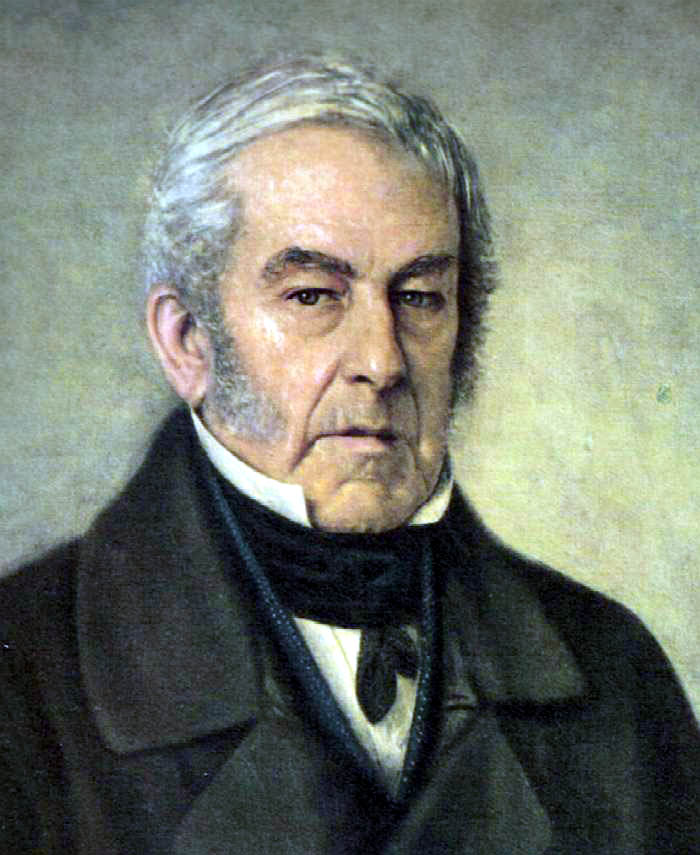
Brigadier General Juan Martín de Pueyrredón by Prilidiano Pueyrredón

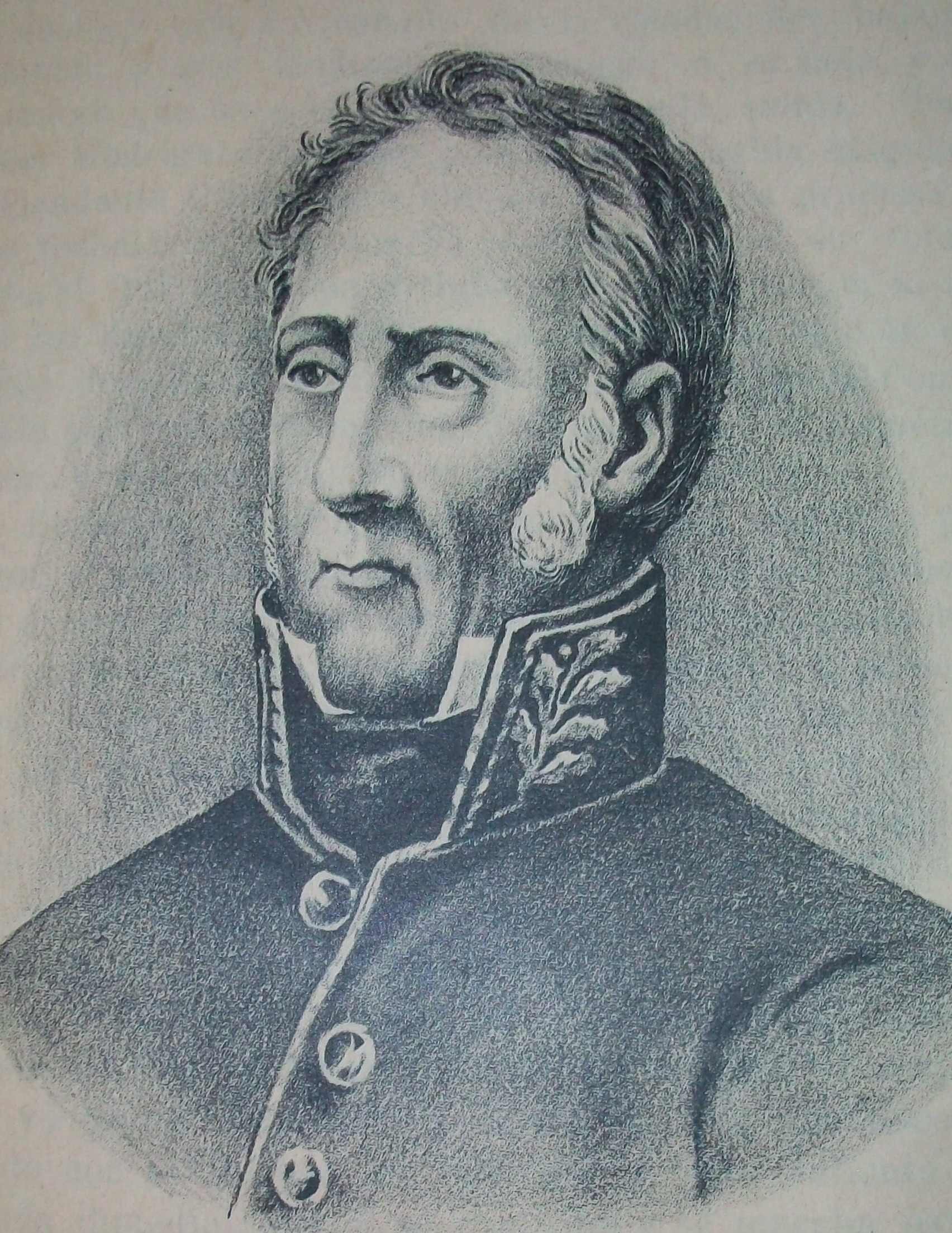
Captain Martín Rodríguez

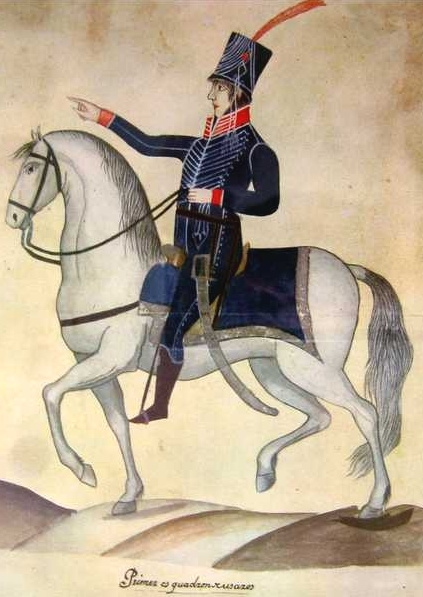
uniform of Hussars of Pueyrredon

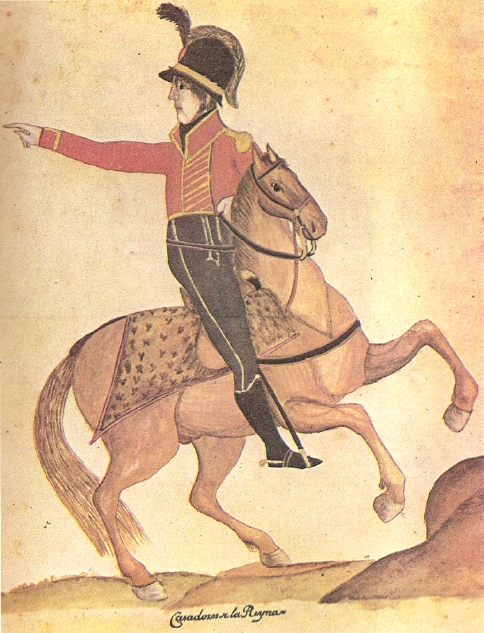
uniform of Cazadores de la Reina

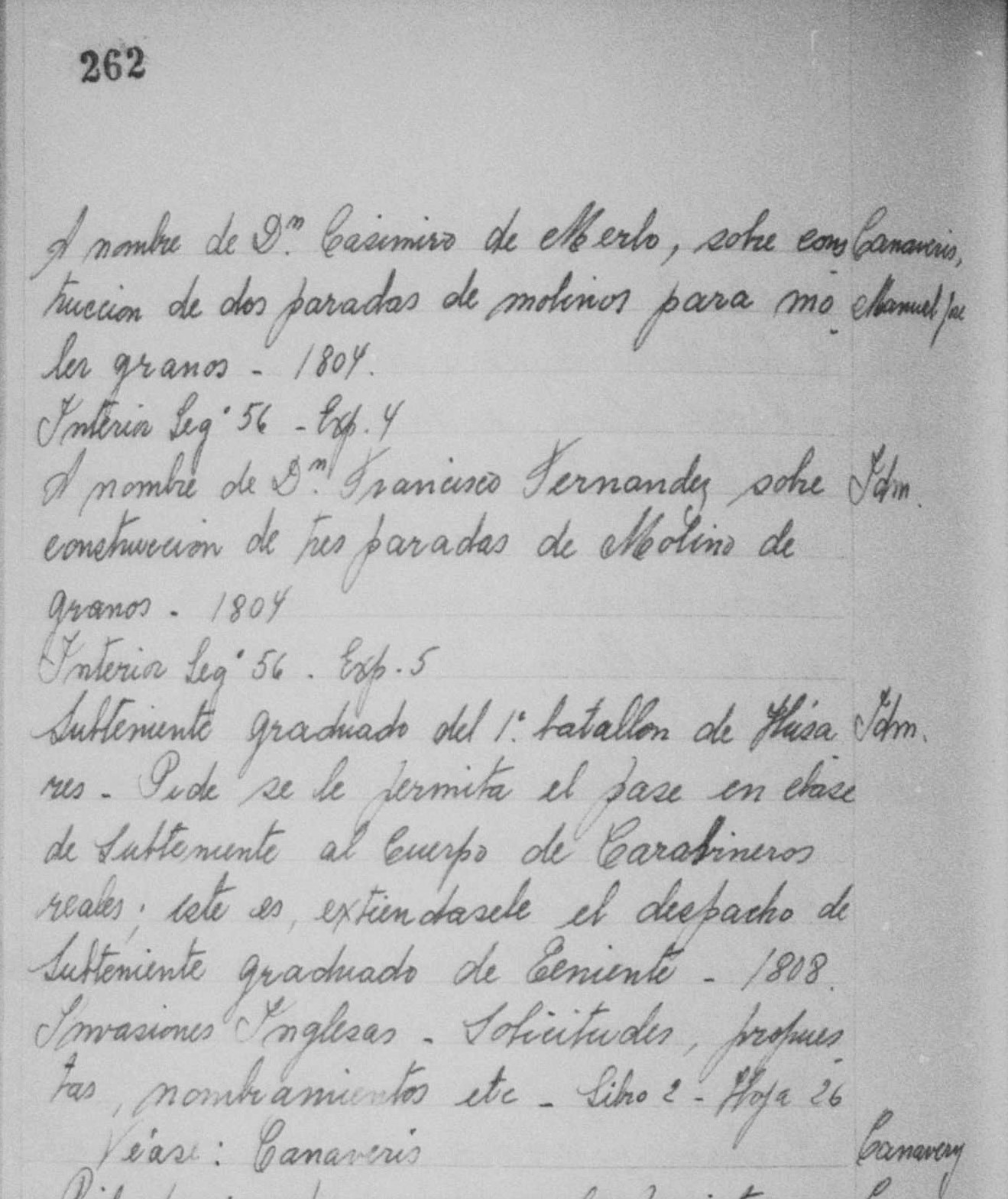
index with the records of an officer belonging to the 1° Hussar Squadron

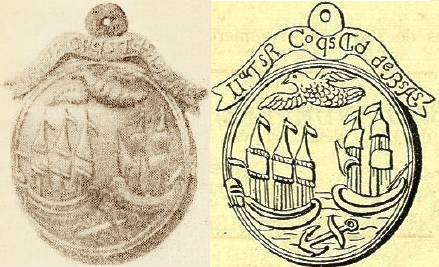
Medal of Perdriel

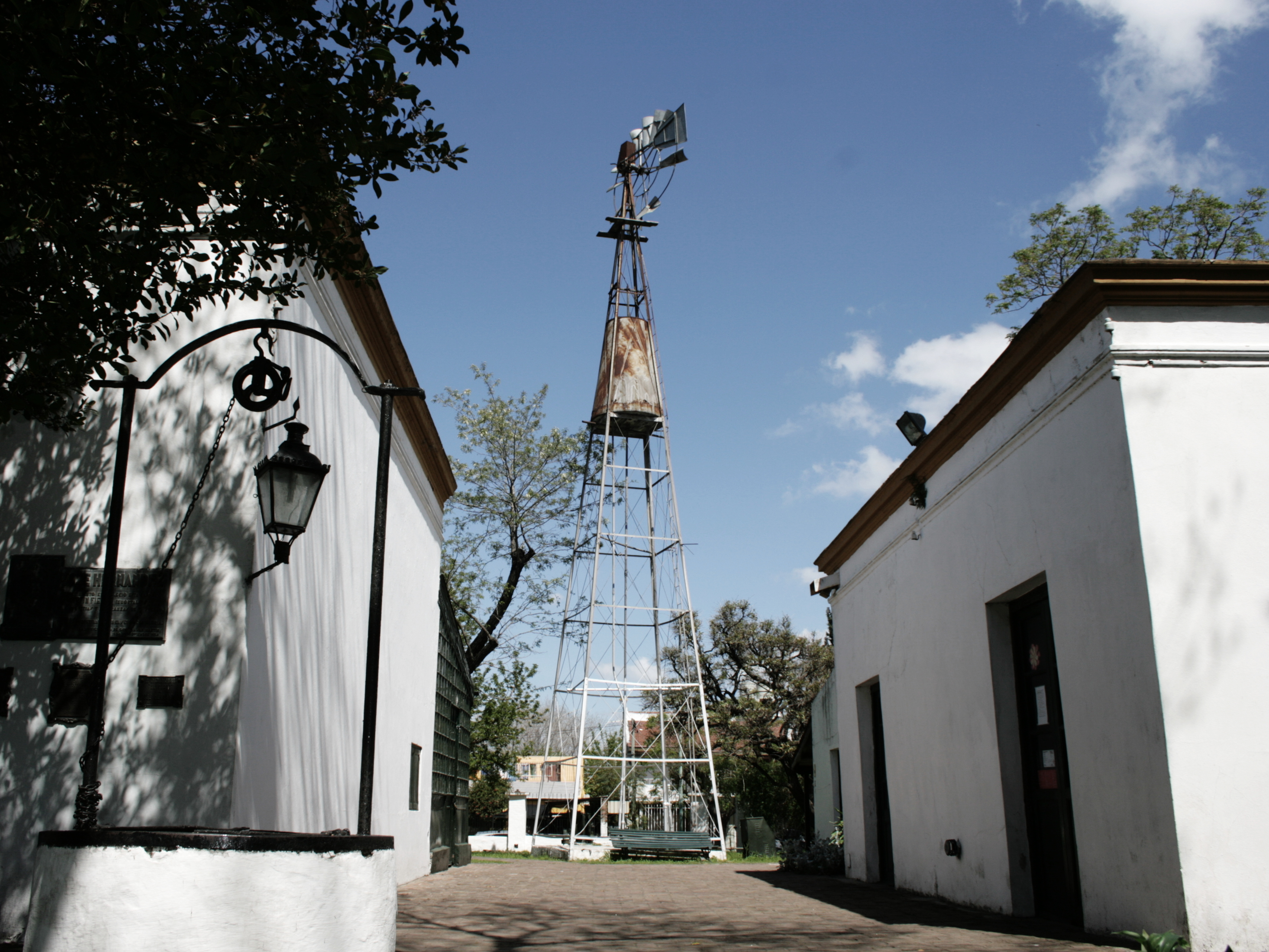
Chacra of Perdriel (place of battle)
