= Hucal =

Coordinates: 37°46′S 64°02′W

- Rural locality and village
- Interactive map of Hucal
- Country: Argentina
- Province: La Pampa Province
- Time zone: UTC−3 (ART)

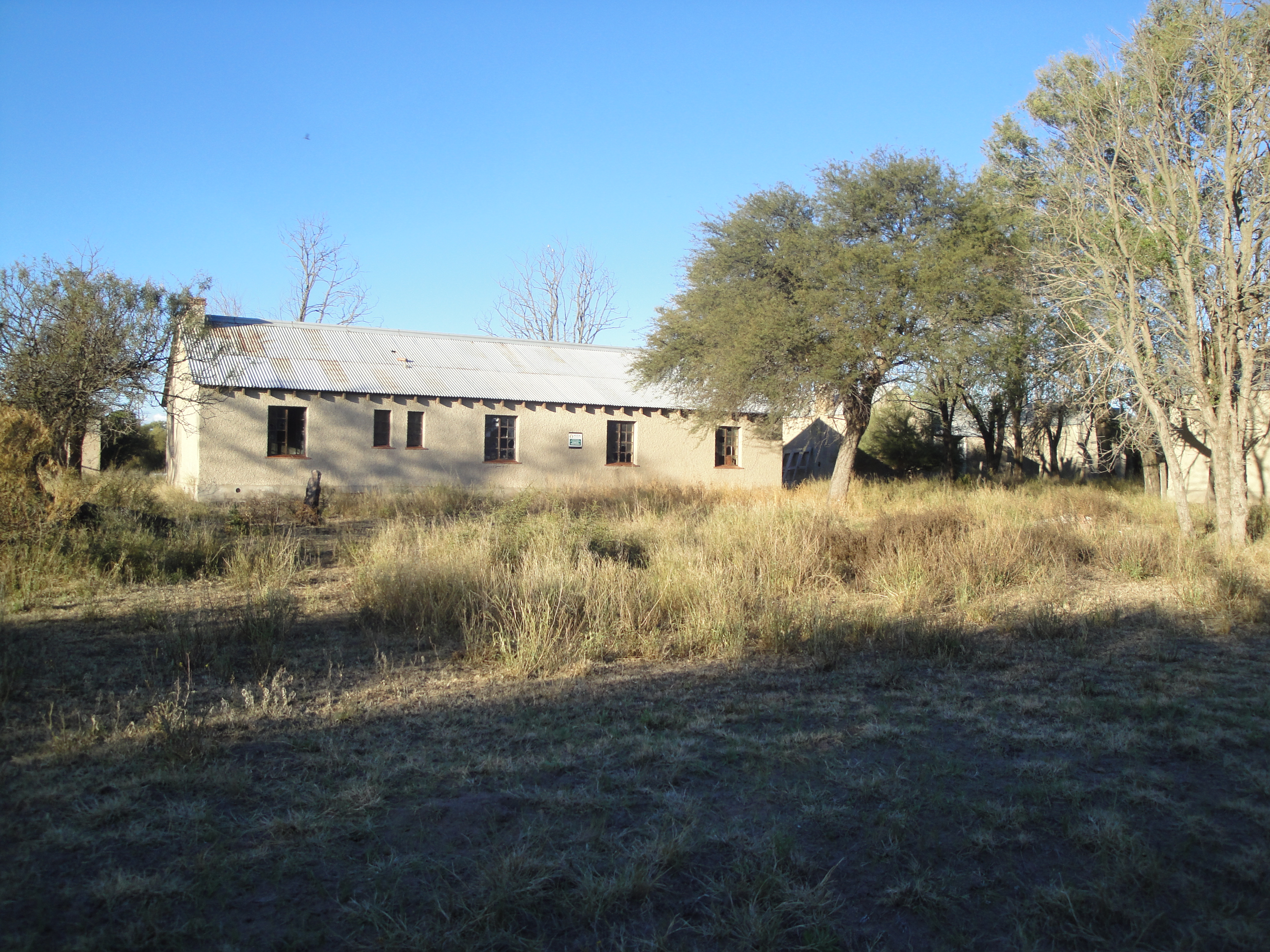

Hucal is a village and rural locality (municipality) in La Pampa Province in Argentina.
