= Club del Progreso =

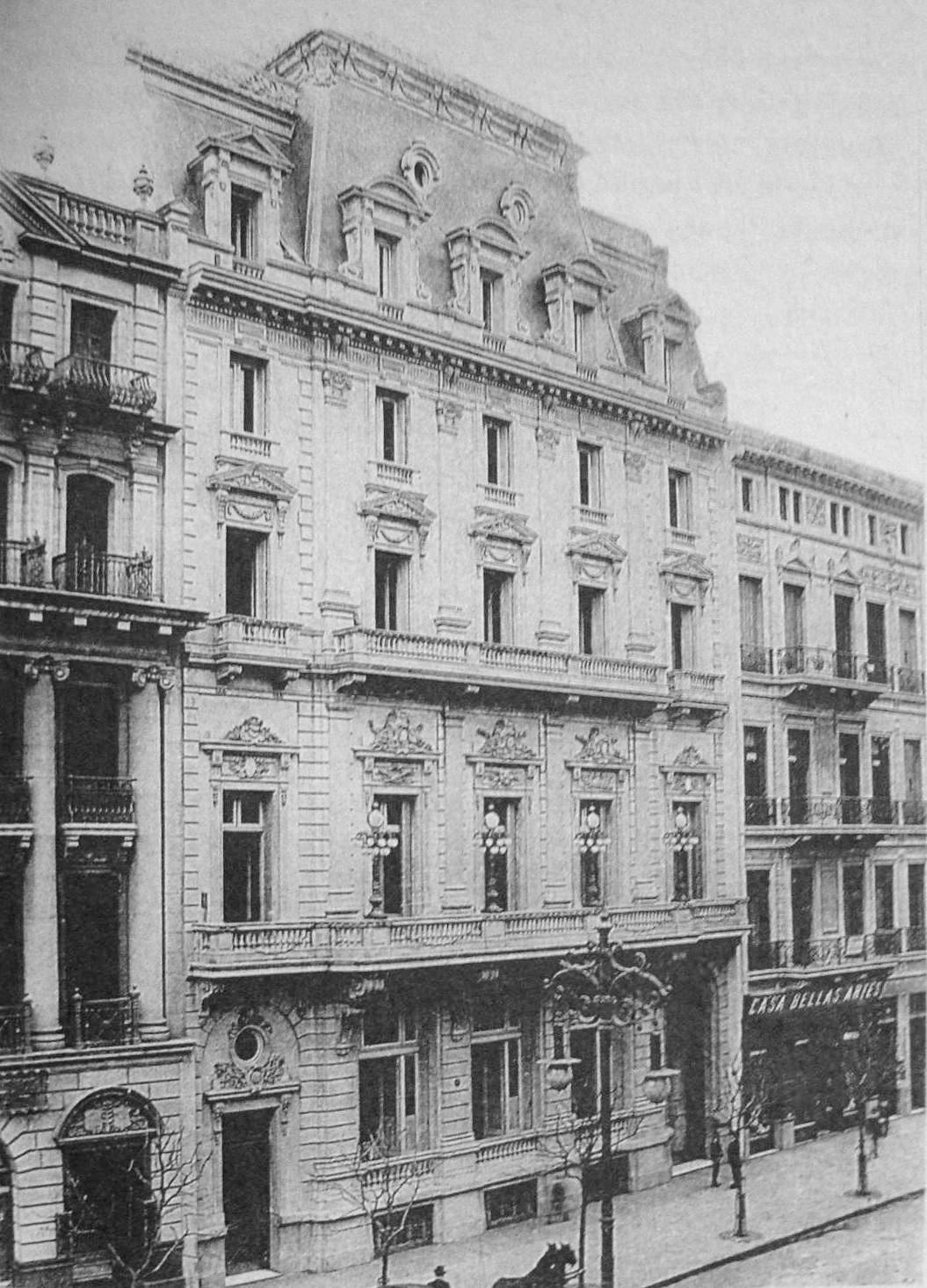
- Headquarters at Avenida de Mayo

General information
- Status: Club Restaurant
- Location: Monserrat, Buenos Aires, Sarmiento No. 1334

The Club del Progreso is an aristocratic Argentine club in Buenos Aires, founded in 1852, after the fall of Juan Manuel de Rosas. It was originally a gentlemen's club, historically located in the neighborhood of Monserrat.

== History ==
It was founded by Diego de Alvear and Rufino de Elizalde on May 1, 1852. Its first headquarters was installed in a house located at the Calle Perú 147, in the Monserrat district. Later it was installed in the Palacio Muñoa, a building made by the English engineer Edward Taylor, located a few meters from the old headquarters on Calle de la Victoria 602.

The Club del Progreso moved its headquarters again in 1900, this time in a building on Avenida de Mayo 633, retaining that headquarters until 1941. Among its partners were several aristocrats, politicians, military and Argentine presidents, including Justo José de Urquiza, Domingo Faustino Sarmiento, Bartolomé Mitre and Julio Argentino Roca.

== Gallery ==
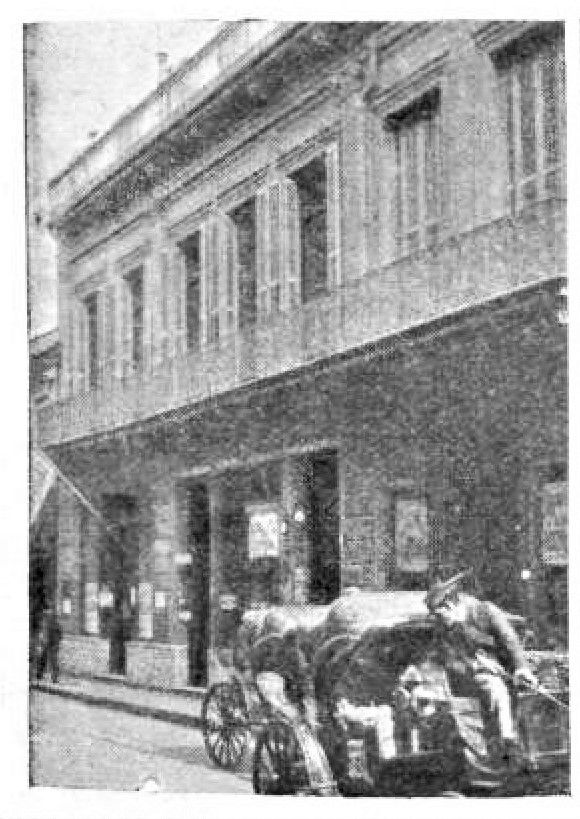
First headquarters of the Club del Progreso

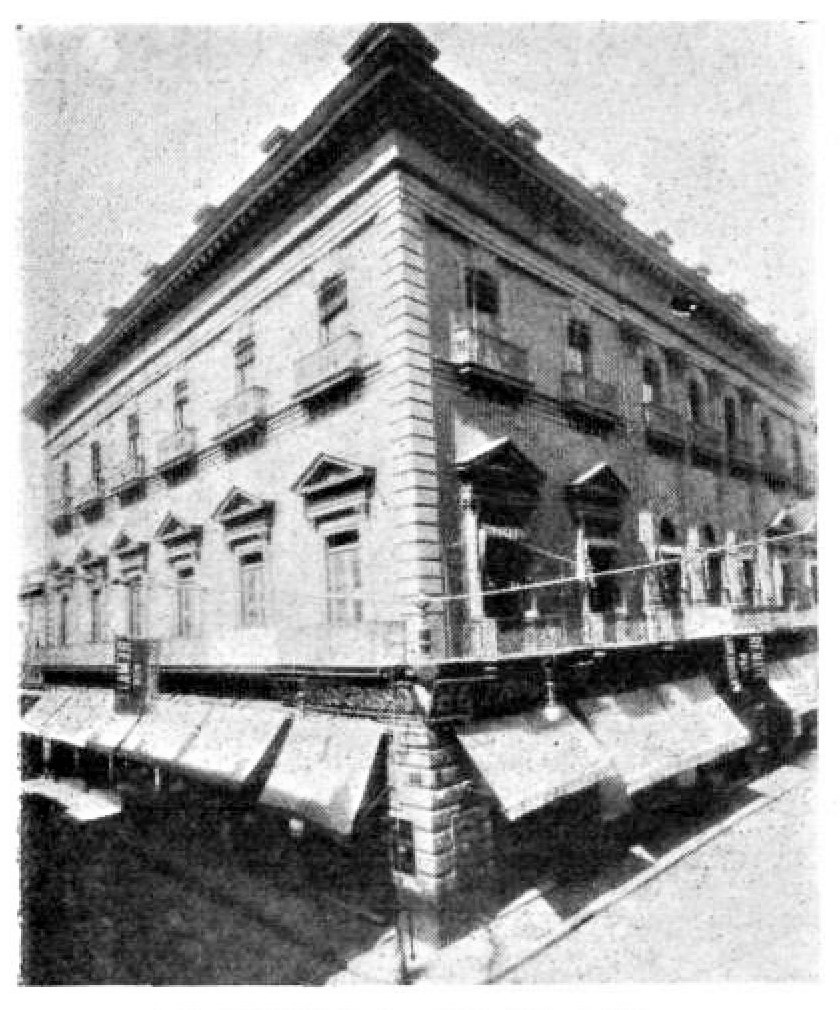
Palacio Muñoa, headquarters of the Club del Progreso until 1900

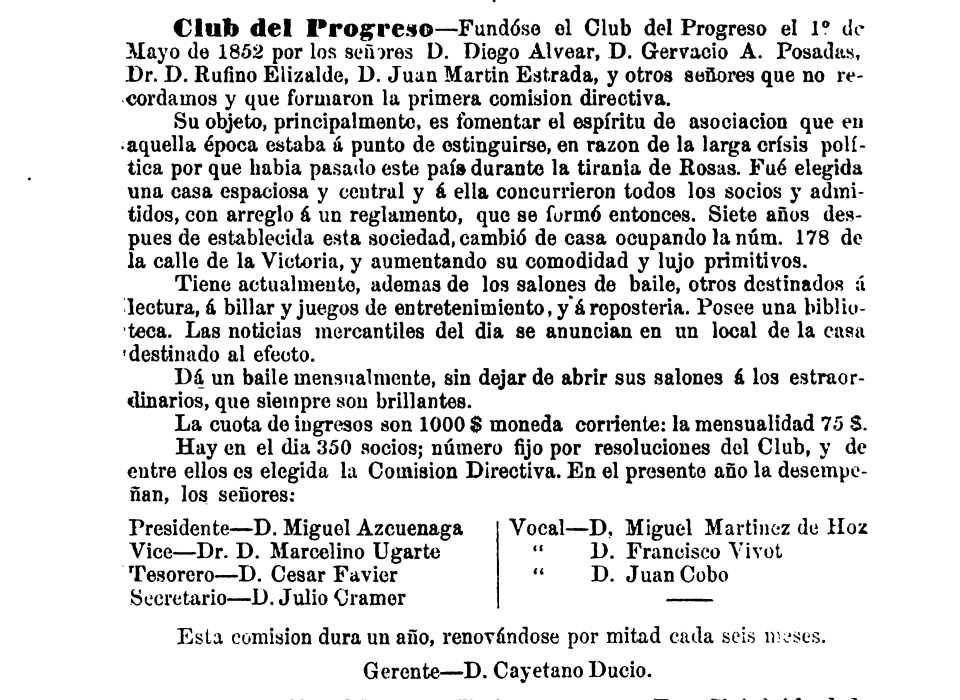
News from the Club del Progreso in Buenos Aires, 1864 Guide

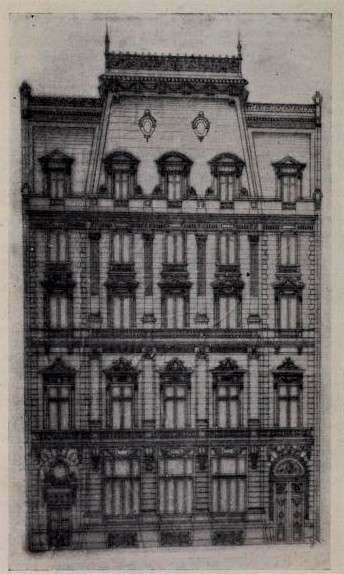
Club del Progreso headquarters in Avenida de Mayo

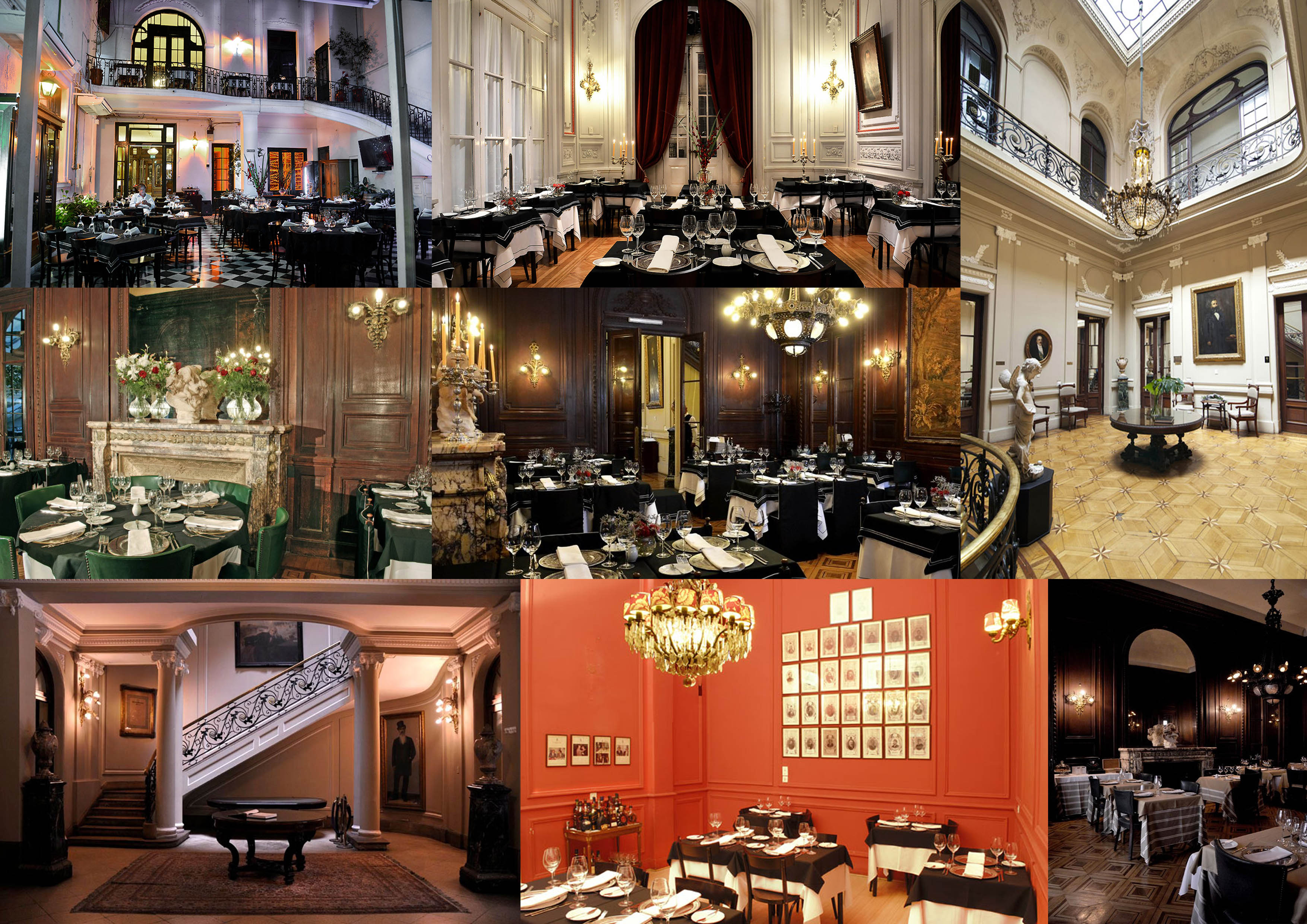
View of the halls of the current headquarters
