= Juan Bautista Rondeau =

Lieutenant Colonel Juan Bautista Rondeau

Comandante Militar in the town of Minas
- In office 1785–1790
- Preceded by: Miguel de Olavarrieta
- Succeeded by: ?

Comandante Militar in the town of Minas
- In office 1793–1794
- Preceded by: ?
- Succeeded by: ?

Personal details
- Born: Jean Baptiste Rondeau Bourgeois; 1735 La Rochelle, France
- Died: 1813 (aged 77–78) Córdoba, Argentina
- Spouse: Lorenza Pereyra
- Occupation: militia
- Profession: army

Military service
- Allegiance: Spain - until 1810 (Argentina) United Provinces of the River Plate
- Branch/service: Spanish Army
- Years of service: 1755-1810
- Rank: Lieutenant colonel
- Unit: Batallón de Voluntarios de Cataluña; Dragones de Buenos Aires; Regimiento de Voluntarios de Córdoba
- Battles/wars: Spanish–Portuguese War; British invasions of the Río de la Plata

Juan Bautista Rondeau (1735 – 1813) was an officer of the Spanish army of French origin, who served in Buenos Aires and Montevideo during the Viceroyalty of Peru and Viceroyalty of the Rio de la Plata, He took part in the Second Cevallos expedition and the British invasions of the Río de la Plata, as part of the veteran forces of the Province of Córdoba.

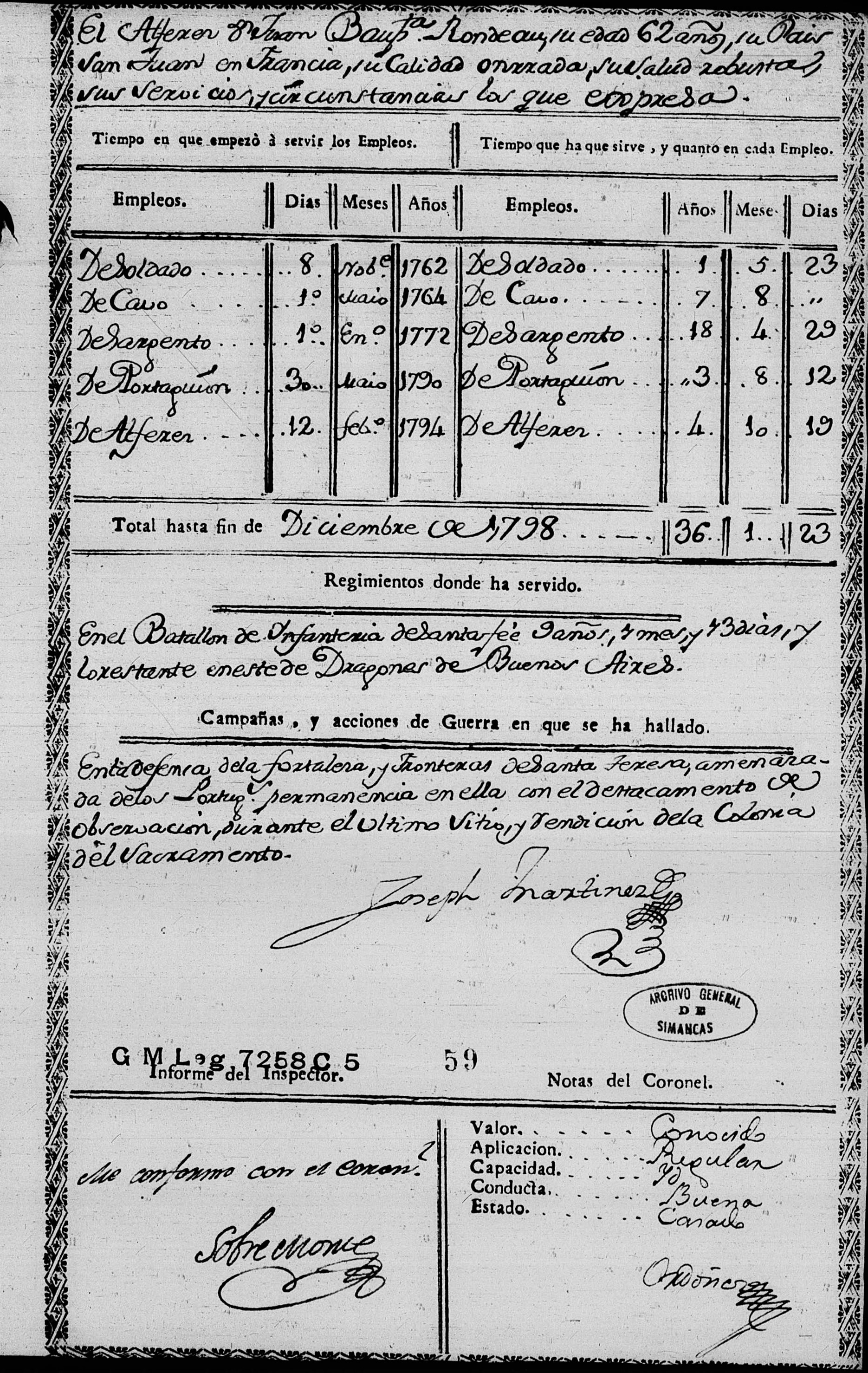
his service record until December 1798

He was born in La Rochelle, Aquitaine, the son of Pierre Rondeau and Catherine Bourgeois, belonging to a distinguished French family. He possibly arrived in the Río de la Plata as a soldier of the volunteer battalion of Catalonia in January 1762. He served for nine years in the Batallon de Infanteria of Santa Fe, serving in the Regimiento de Dragones de Buenos Aires since 1771. He took an active part in the defense of the Fortaleza de Santa Teresa, occurred during the Spanish Portuguese war.

In 1785 he was appointed as a military commander in Minas, Uruguay, a position he held until 1790. He served in the veteran corps of the Regimiento de Voluntarios de Córdoba during the English Invasions of the Río de la Plata. After the May Revolution he went on to serve under the orders of the Primera Junta, supporting the emancipatory cause until his death.

Juan Bautista Rondeau was married in Buenos Aires to Lorenza Pereira, daughter of Ricardo Pereyra and Maria Josefa Cabral, belonging to a Creole family of Portuguese roots. His son, José Rondeau y Pereyra, served as Supreme Director of the United Provinces of the Río de la Plata in 1815.
