= Indigenous women in the conquest of Paraguay =

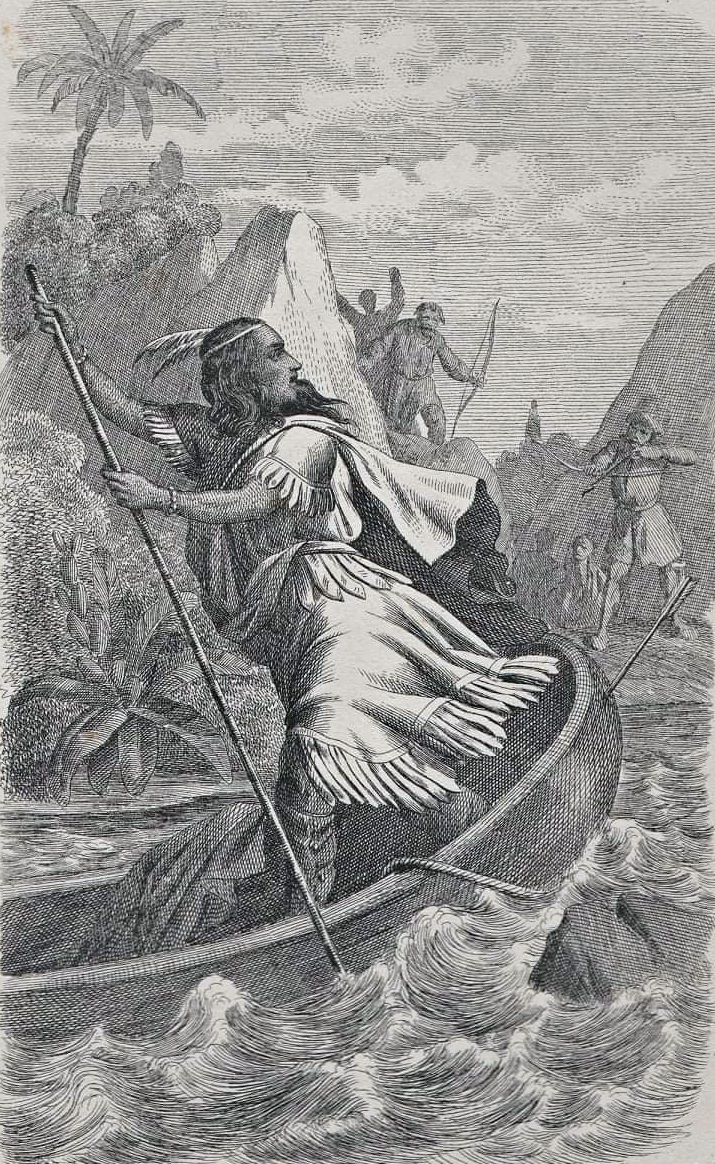
French engraving of 1877 depicting a Guaraní woman fleeing the Spanish conquistadors.

The role of indigenous women in the conquest of Paraguay was central, as the insertion of the Spanish conquistadors into the native societies of the Río de la Plata basin was based on the relationships established with them. In these matrilineal societies, women were the most prized asset of the entire community both as agricultural producers and reproducers of the labor force; through the cuñadazgo—a Guaraní institution by which caciques sealed alliances by giving women to newcomers, transforming them into brothers-in-law or sons-in-law—the first bond between the Guaraní and the Spaniards was structured. The chronicler Ulrich Schmidl described how the Cario people (a Guaraní subgroup) of the settlement of Lambaré gave six women to Captain Juan de Ayolas—the eldest eighteen years old—and two to each soldier of his troop as a sign of peace, so that they would "take care of us, cook, wash and attend to other things".

The abandonment of Buenos Aires (which would not be refounded until 1580) and the concentration of the Spanish colonization in Asunción from 1541 onwards marked a turning point: growing demand overwhelmed the cuñadazgo and gave way to the rancheadas, mass and violent deportations of Guaraní women that transformed them into objects of buying and selling, common currency in commercial transactions and merchandise exported to the Portuguese port of São Vicente. The licentious life between colonists and indigenous women was such that the famous nickname "paradise of Muhammad" (Spanish: Paraíso de Mahoma)—in reference to polygamy in Islam—arose to describe the city, coined in a 1545 letter of denunciation by the priest Francisco González de Paniagua and since then turned into an enduring literary trope. An emblematic case of resistance was that of India Juliana, a Cario woman who between 1539 and 1542 poisoned her Spanish master and was executed by order of Álvar Núñez Cabeza de Vaca, and who is today championed by Paraguayan feminism.

The mestizaje that emerged from these unions plays a central role in the traditional historiography of Paraguay, which locates in it the origins of the nation and presents it as a harmonious and consensual process. However, modern scholars argue that the process fundamentally involved a relationship of sexual exploitation and economic exploitation, rather than reciprocal exchange.

== History ==
=== 1537–1541: First pacts between the Guaraní and the Spaniards ===
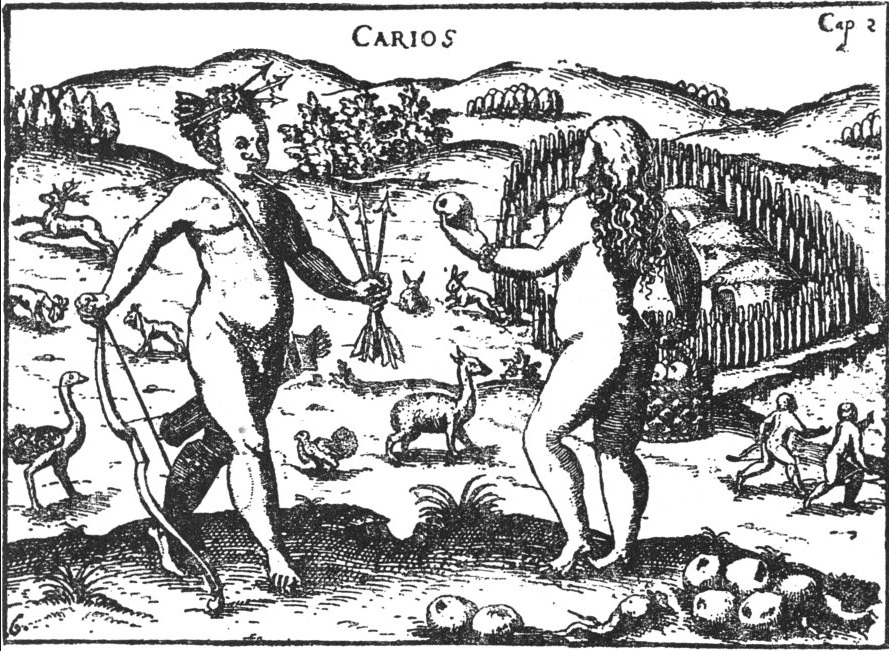
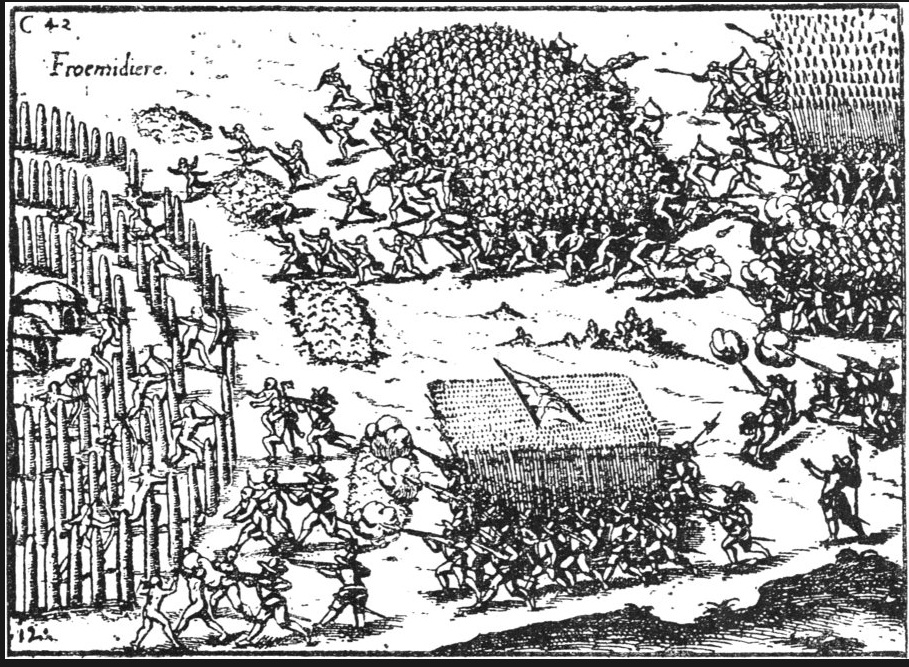
Two 1599 engravings from Ulrich Schmidl's chronicles of his travels in the Río de la Plata basin between 1534 and 1554, depicting the Cario people (above) and a clash between them and the Spanish conquistadors (below).

The Guaraní are the inhabitants of the Eastern Region of Paraguay, the Central-West Region of Brazil, the Argentine Northeast and scattered settlements in parts of the Paraguayan Chaco and Bolivian Chaco. Since they had no writing system, the only way to approach the characteristics of their pre-colonial life is through archaeology. The pre-Columbian Guaraní were a semi-nomadic people who combined gathering and hunting with agriculture, migrating whenever they exhausted the resources of a site. Their social organization was based on the guaras, territorial groupings in which members lived in open community. Also called provinces by the Spaniards, the guaras were well-defined regions with cultivated areas and hunting grounds that could only be used by community members. Several scholars indicate that around 1500, six guaras inhabited what is now the Eastern Region of Paraguay: the Carios, the Tobatí, the Guambaré, the Itati-Guaraní, the Mba'everá and the Paraná-Guaraní. For their part, the Jesuits identified fourteen major groups at the time of their arrival: Carios, Tobatines, Guarambarenses, Itatines, Mbarakayúenses, Mondayenses, Paranáes, Ygañáenses, Yguazúenses, Uruguayenses, Tapes, Mbiazás, Guairáes and Chandules. The Cario people inhabited the area between the Manduvirá, Tebicuary and Paraguay rivers, with particular importance given to the zones of the Ypacaraí Lake, the area of Quiindy and Acahay. To the northwest—in the Chaco region—they bordered other nomadic and warlike ethnic groups, including the Guaycurúes.

The Carios were the first Guaraní group to come into contact with the Spanish conquistadors. The first Spanish expeditions to establish settlements in the Río de la Plata basin arose from the mistaken belief that the region was rich in minerals, especially gold and silver. The suspicion that the Río de la Plata concealed an undiscovered treasure grew after the Spaniards obtained great wealth from the capture of Atahualpa, and from the accounts of Sebastian Cabot, an explorer who traveled to the region and encountered survivors of the previous expedition of Juan Díaz de Solís, who "confirmed" that there were large deposits of gold and silver there. Spanish attempts to settle in the Plata basin began in the 1530s, starting with the construction in 1536 of the fort of Santa María del Buen Aire (or Buenos Aires) on the banks of the Río de la Plata, founded by Pedro de Mendoza, the first adelantado of the region. A year later, on 15 August 1537, the conquistador Juan de Salazar y Espinosa—a member of Mendoza's expedition—founded the fort of Nuestra Señora de la Asunción on the banks of the Paraguay River, in Cario territory.

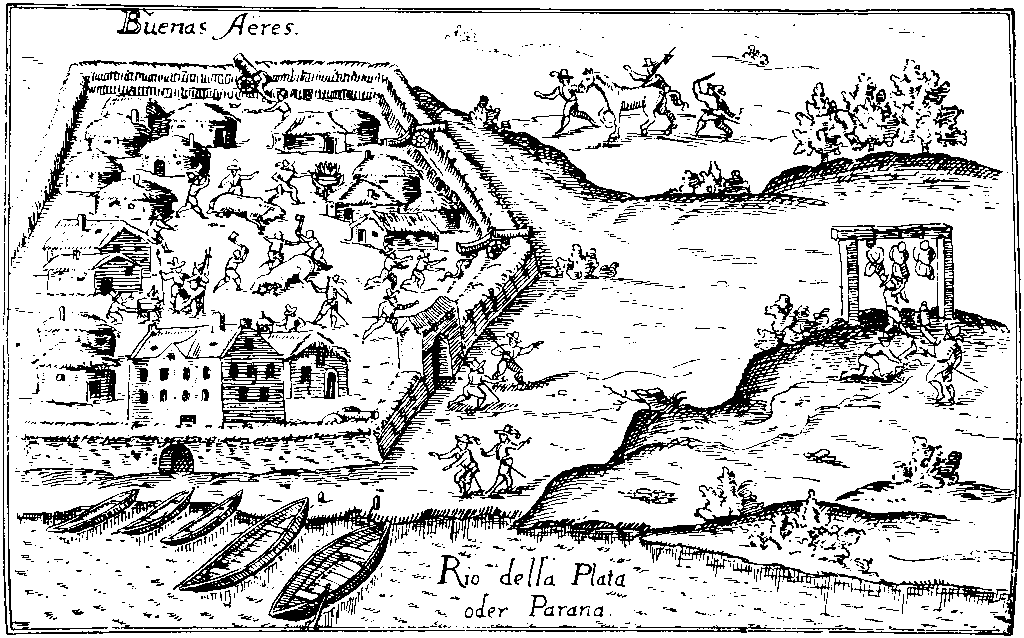
A 1599 engraving from Schmidl's chronicles depicting the recently founded Buenos Aires around 1536.

Despite an initially conflictive encounter, the Spaniards—with their firearms—managed to subdue some of the main caciques, later establishing an alliance with the remaining caciques around Asunción. Mendoza sent the explorers Juan de Ayolas and Domingo Martínez de Irala to sail upriver along the Paraná in search of resources, while he himself settled in Buenos Aires. In 1537, having no news of Ayolas or Irala, Mendoza decided to return to Spain, naming Ayolas as adelantado and Francisco Ruiz Galán as governor of Buenos Aires before his departure. Irala was at a natural harbor known as La Candelaria—a short distance from where Fort Borbon stands today—awaiting Ayolas, who was seeking a route to Peru. As Ayolas never returned from the expedition, Irala returned to Asunción in 1538, where he was elected by his companions to take command in Ayolas's absence.

The Cario people established a pact of interests with the conquistadors, providing them with food and warriors in exchange for protection against enemy peoples such as the Payaguá. The Cario caciques sealed these pacts through the giving of women. The explorer Ulrich Schmidl—who traveled through the Plata basin between 1534 and 1554—recounts in his 1599 chronicles that the Carios of the settlement of Lambaré (possibly the same site where Asunción was founded) sealed peace with Ayolas through the giving of women, writing in "Chapter XXI":

After this, we came to the town, but the Indians who were there held out as best they could and defended themselves very valiantly for two days. When the Indians saw they could no longer hold out and feared for their women and children, for they had them at their side in the town, they came, these aforesaid Carios, and asked our captain general Juan Ayolas to receive them in pardon; that they would do everything that we wanted. They also brought and gave our captain Juan Ayolas six women, the eldest being eighteen years old; they also made him a gift of about nine deer and other game. They further asked us to stay with them and gave to each man of war or soldier two women to take care of us, cook, wash and attend to other things beyond what one at that time had needed. They also gave us sustenance of food of which we were in need on that occasion. With this, peace was made with the Carios.

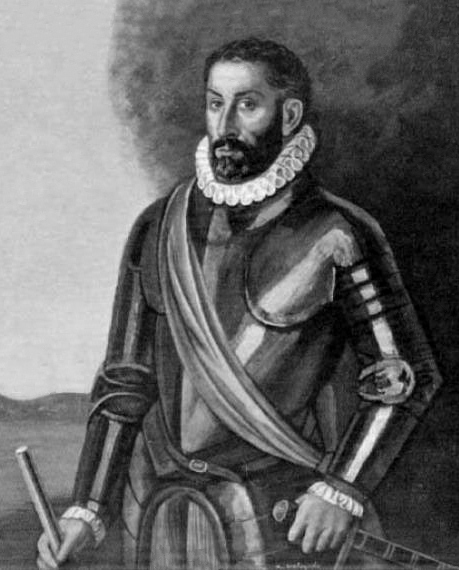
Portrait of Domingo Martínez de Irala, who governed Paraguay for much of the 1540s and 1550s.

Between 1537 and 1541, the giving of women to the conquistadors took place within the framework of the cuñadazgo, a concept used by Guaraní leaders to create pacts of peace and mutual benefit, since it transformed the recipient into a brother-in-law or son-in-law. The Guaraní were organized in small family-type communities called teii, which were matrilineal in character, given that descent belonged to the maternal lineage and both children and partners resided in the maternal community, with the mother's brother being the highest family authority. Through the cuñadazgo—another fundamental aspect of Guaraní culture—women linked different descent groups, thereby generating bonds of reciprocity and strategic alliances between the teii. As researcher Macarena Perusset explains:

"The Guaraní woman played a fundamental social role since the potential of the teii depended on the abundance within it of women of reproductive age, who assured, on one hand, the community's continuity through descent, and on the other, the adhesion to it of men from other teii with whom they guaranteed future bonds of alliance. In this type of matrilineal society the husband acquired the right to the woman's domestic services, which included the cultivation of food products. Among the Guaraní, kinship involved a series of obligations and rights essential for group cohesion: every man who received a woman as a wife had to compensate the giving lineage by cooperating in various productive tasks with his father-in-law or brother-in-law, as well as participating with them in war and hunting parties. This compensation was indispensable, since women, as agricultural producers and reproducers of the labor force, were the most prized asset of the entire community."

Indeed, given that the Spaniards' treatment of the Guaraní was one of domination rather than reciprocity, their initial pacts were soon followed by indigenous uprisings, with at least three documented incidents of violence in 1538–1539, 1542–1543, and 1545–1546.

=== 1541–1554: The rise of the rancheadas and the "paradise of Muhammad" ===
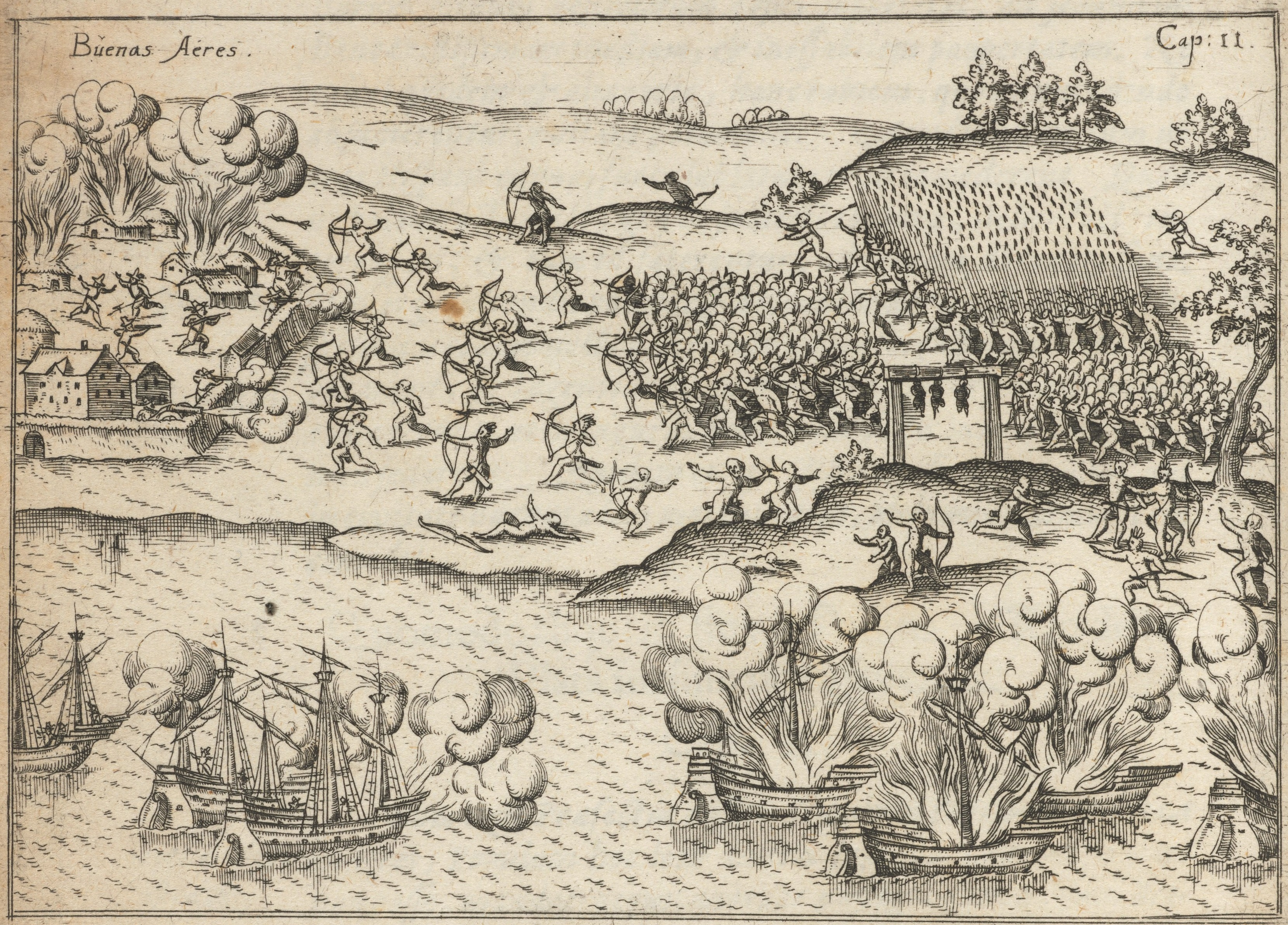
A 1599 engraving from Schmidl's chronicles depicting the destruction of Buenos Aires in 1541, after which its inhabitants settled in Asunción.

In July 1541, Irala ordered the evacuation of the port of Buenos Aires and converted the fort and port of Asunción into the center of the Spanish colonization of the Río de la Plata region. The first mention of indigenous women in the colonial documents dates from that year, in letters the governor left for the next expeditions coming from Spain, explaining his decision to depopulate Buenos Aires and move the center of operations to Asunción. One of them reads: "in Paraguay [...] there is founded [...] a town in which there will be [...] 400 men [...] as vassals of His Majesty the Guarany Indians that is the Carios [...] who serve the Christians [...] along with their women in all things necessary for service and I command for the better service of the Christians 300 women to serve them in their houses and in the fields." This passage shows that the presence of 300 Guaraní women in the new settlement was the decisive argument for moving the central city from Buenos Aires to Asunción. It also indicates that the tasks carried out by the indigenous women in Asunción were domestic and agricultural labor. As researcher Guillaume Candela notes, the Spaniards "after having suffered famine and disastrous living conditions in Buenos Aires, were very likely pleased at the idea of having servants and lovers. The woman in this context appears as a considerable improvement in the conquerors' lives. (...) Basically, the Indian woman is presented as the most important element in this society under construction, since the entire supply circuit of these colonists was in the hands of these women."

In Paraguay, Indian women are trophies of the wheel, dice, or cards, the booty of expeditions into the jungle, the motives for duels and murders. Although there are many of them, the ugliest is worth as much as a side of bacon or a horse. The conquistadors of Indies and Indians go to Mass followed by flocks of women. In this land sterile of gold and silver, some have eighty or a hundred, who by day grind sugarcane and by night spin thread and let themselves be loved, to provide their masters with honey, clothing, children: They help toward forgetting the dream of wealth that reality denied and the distant girlfriends who grow old waiting in Spain.

— Eduardo Galeano, Memory of Fire, 1982.

The depopulation of Buenos Aires isolated Asunción from every civilized center, which led to a relaxation of sexual morality in the city. According to historian Fabián Chamorro, by the time the inhabitants of Buenos Aires arrived in Asunción, the settlement already had around 2,000 mestizos as a result of the relationships between Spaniards and Guaraní women. The abandonment of Buenos Aires and the conversion of Asunción into a city in 1541 had a strong impact on Hispanic-indigenous relations. From that moment on, the supply of women linked to the regional caciques could not satisfy the demands of the growing Spanish population, causing the disappearance of the cuñadazgo and giving way to the rancheadas. Unlike the cuñadazgo, the rancheadas were violent mass deportations of Guaraní women, bypassing the authority of the cacique. The rancheadas were "techniques conceived and put into practice by the conquistadors and more specifically by the lenguas [interpreters] who could converse with the indigenous women." In a 1556 letter addressed to the Crown, the cleric Martín González denounced the practice:

"these interpreters [...] would go secretly and hide in the reed beds or rushes that were near the water sources where the old women had to go for water, and when they arrived [...] they made them say how many young Indian women there were in the house, and as they named them one by one they would write them down along with their names; afterwards they would go to the house and take hold of the cacique and begin to read and name each one by her name and whose daughter she was, and seeing the cacique that they were naming them and asking for them in the captain's name, one by one, two by two, they made them bring them all out, and in this way they would bring so many."

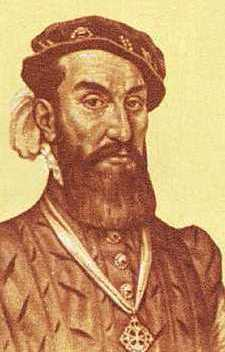
Portrait of Álvar Núñez Cabeza de Vaca, who replaced Irala in command of Paraguay between 1542 and 1544.

Besides being presented as sexual objects and instruments of labor, Guaraní women also functioned as markers of socioeconomic power, both for indigenous people and for the conquistadors. An example of this is a 1545 indigenous interrogation in which a correlation is drawn between women and power: "asking the Agace Indians why they gave their women to the Cario Indians, they responded that it was because the Cario Indians said they were the strong ones and that they should give them their women, because otherwise they would kill them." In the interrogation of the lenguas or interpreters conducted in 1543, it was established that these officials also accumulated women as a symbol of power: the interpreter Juan Pérez declared he possessed "22 Indian women" and Francisco Rodríguez "12 Indian women." The process of the rancheadas enabled the rapid transformation of indigenous women into objects of buying and selling in the slave market, both internal and external to Asunción. The illegal trafficking of indigenous women spread to such an extent that Guaraní women came to be used as common currency, the object of more or less complex transactions, like any other commodity that could be acquired.

In their search for any system that would allow enrichment, the conquistadors expanded the trade in indigenous women beyond Asunción, creating commercial networks for the sale of free or enslaved women toward the neighboring Portuguese territory of the Atlantic coast. In particular, the city became a concentration camp for enslaved women to feed the slave market of the Portuguese port of São Vicente on the coast of Brazil. The conquistador Diego Téllez de Escobar denounced in 1556 that Governor Irala himself had allowed several Portuguese to take indigenous men and women from the land to Brazil as slaves, with even the royal officials collecting taxes on those sales as if they were African slaves. The first conquistador Antonio de la Trinidad was more precise: he identified the Portuguese traders who came to Asunción to obtain slaves—among them, one Farina and Diego Díaz, from São Vicente—noting that on one such trip they took about thirty Indian women sold as slaves, and that three or four more Spaniards, seeing that it was permitted, also left "each one with their half dozen."

In a 1545 letter, Pero Hernández notes that "Domingo de Irala sold to Tristán de Vallartas (...) a free Cario Indian woman for a scarlet cloak and a velvet jacket [...] he sold an Indian man and an Indian woman of the Agace people for a scarlet cloak and a quilt to a friar of the Order of Mercy." The Franciscan friar Bernardo de Armenta denounced in a letter of 10 October 1544 that the colonists were taking indigenous women from their communities to serve them and then selling them to each other "at very excessive prices" as if they were slaves, when they were in fact free vassals of the Spanish Crown. For his part, in the account he presented at the Court in December 1545, Álvar Núñez Cabeza de Vaca himself denounced that the Franciscan friars Armenta and Lebrón kept within their houses and monastery more than thirty indigenous women between twelve and twenty years old "as enclosed as if they were their wives," going so far as to chain, flog, and threaten men out of jealousy toward those women.

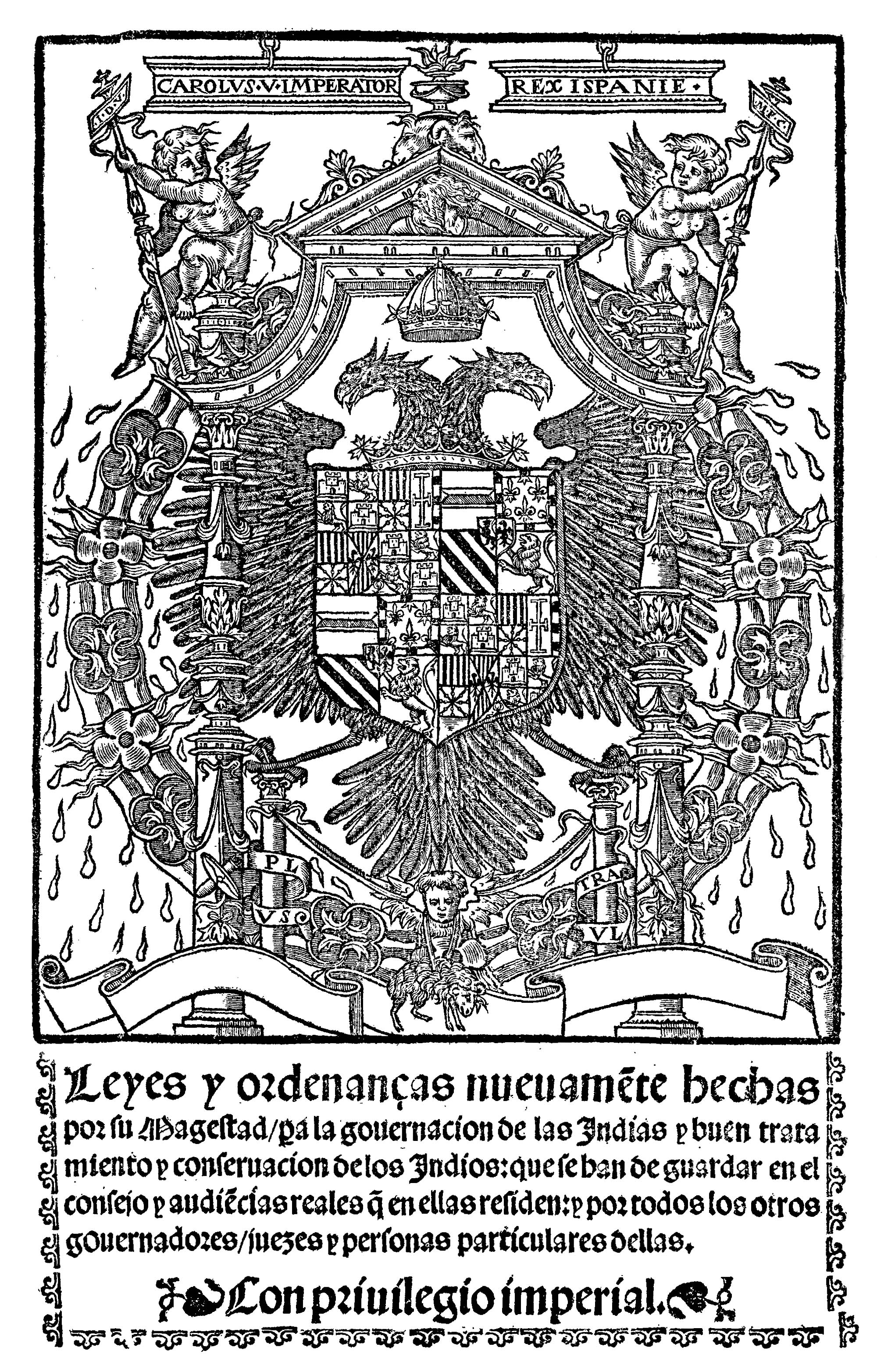
Cover of the New Laws (1542), enacted to protect indigenous peoples from exploitation, although their enforcement was systematically ignored in Paraguay.

In March 1542, Álvar Núñez Cabeza de Vaca arrived in Asunción as the second adelantado of the region, taking power from Irala and declaring himself protector of the indigenous peoples. Before being deposed and sent to Spain as a prisoner in 1544—accused by the colonists of being too "permissive with the natives"—he issued several provisions to curb the abuses against Guaraní women. On 5 April 1542, Cabeza de Vaca prohibited the bartering of indigenous women for pieces or objects of metal, imposing penalties such as economic fines, exile, or forced labor on brigantines. Before being imprisoned, he issued a new decree on 19 March 1544 that explicitly prohibited any person from "taking" Guaraní women from their villages for service, or from ransoming free or enslaved Guaraní women, under the same penalties.

In 1542, the New Laws were promulgated from Barcelona, which prohibited any change in the status of indigenous people. However, the conquistadors and settlers of Asunción continued to act without respecting the new legislation, as denounced by the priest Francisco González de Paniagua in a letter written on 3 March 1545:

"There has been used since the imprisonment of the governor among the Christians of this land a trade and commerce under great deception very much to the offense of God our Lord, harm and damage to the conscience of His Majesty and against his royal provisions, and this is to sell the free and native Indian women of this land as if they were slaves come from Guinea in this fashion: I sell a house and a field that may be worth at public auction 20 ducats and no more and I say to the person to whom I sell it: I have to give you this house and field and you must make me an obligation of 40 ducats in which only the house and field were involved, and because these 2 pieces are not worth so much by a great amount, that as agreed between you and me [...] I will give you 1 Guaraní Indian woman from this land [...] who you know is free and cannot be sold [...] Another somewhat more licit one and in this out of necessity of the land, in which they had remedied themselves of service and firewood, in this land they were stripped of some garment: I have a cloak and another has an Indian woman, and the cloak was exchanged for the Indian woman out of the necessity that one has for the cloak and the other for the Indian woman, under the pretext of not selling the Indian woman but her service, passing from one to the other with the same freedom she had before / it has also been practiced to give and exchange a branded slave for a free Indian woman / and in this case not only laypeople have erred but even religious."

In this letter, Paniagua equates free indigenous women with African slaves, particularly from Guinea, the preeminent origin of African slaves deported to the Americas. The historical documentation of Paraguay includes few references to African slaves, indicating instead a significant presence of indigenous people enslaved in wars. The famous epithet "paradise of Muhammad" has its origin in Paniagua's letter, where he denounces the licentious life of the conquistadors with the indigenous women and states: "The Christians here have a vice of women; he who has eight has so because he cannot have sixteen, and the very poor man has three or five, and the majority twenty, thirty, and forty. And the Indians are not called anything but brothers-in-law and fathers-in-law with such shamelessness and little fear of God as there is in being concubined with the Indian women, that there is no Quran of Muhammad that would permit such shamelessness..."; adding furthermore that "it even seems to me that they use more freedoms, since the other does not extend beyond seven women, and here some have seventy." From then on, the expression "paradise of Muhammad" has become an enduring literary trope to refer to Asunción's sexual scandals. Already around 1580, Father Pedro de Ribadeneira noted in a letter sent to Spain that the common folk of Asunción used the phrase "paradise of Muhammad" to refer to the city.

A modern depiction of India Juliana, a Cario woman executed in Asunción around 1542 for killing her Spanish master and urging other indigenous women to do the same.

As a result of this fusion of ethnicities, a new population of mestizos arose in Paraguay, also known as mancebos de la tierra ("sons of the land"). The Spaniard Alonso Riquelme de Guzmán rejoiced in this in a letter he sent to his father from Asunción in 1545: "they serve us as slaves and give us their daughters to serve us in the house and in the field, from whom and from us there are more than four hundred mestizos, male and female; so that your grace may see whether we are good settlers as much as conquistadors." Irala has been called the "father of mestizaje," being the one who contributed the policy of consolidating mestizaje in the colony. In his 1556 testament, the governor acknowledged nine sons and daughters he had with seven different indigenous women, writing:

"I say and declare and confess that I have and God has given me in this province certain daughters and sons who are: Diego Martínez de Yrala and Antonio de Irala, and Doña Ginebra Martínez de Yrala, my children and of María, my servant, daughter of Pedro de Mendoza, a principal Indian of this land; and doña Marina de Yrala, daughter of Juana my servant; and Doña Isabel de Yrala, daughter of Águeda, my servant; and doña Úrsula de Yrala, daughter of Leonor, my servant; and Martín Pérez de Yrala, son of Escolástica, my servant; and Ana de Yrala, daughter of Marina, my servant; and María, daughter of Beatriz, servant of Diego de Villalpando. And being as I hold and declare them as my sons and daughters, and as such I have married them according to the law and with blessing, as the Holy Mother Church commands..."

An emblematic case of resistance to the colonial regime of sexual slavery was that of India Juliana, a Cario woman who between 1539 and 1542 poisoned her Spanish master or husband, Ñuño de Cabrera, with herbs, and was set free despite having confessed to the crime. Her story was introduced by Cabeza de Vaca in an account he presented as judicial evidence to the Council of the Indies in December 1545. The case of Juliana is also described—although without mentioning her name—in a chronicle written by Pero Hernández on 28 January 1545. Cabeza de Vaca recounts that upon arriving in Asunción, he learned of the crime and impunity of Juliana, who even boasted of her actions to her companions. In response, he ordered her execution by dismemberment, as punishment for the crime and as a warning to the other indigenous women not to do the same. In 2020, political scientist Gabriela Schvartzman observed that "Alvar Núñez's account of the India Juliana case has a double moral: the first, to expose the chaos that Irala's policies had generated in the colony, above all regarding the promiscuous life that the Spaniards led with the indigenous women and to sanction these behaviors, demonstrating his moral superiority and civilizing capacity. (...) The second moral has to do with women's defiance of the imposed colonial sexual system. In the full context of rancheadas and indigenous uprisings, it was not at all good for women to imitate Juliana's actions, who was capable of killing her husband to free herself from his yoke and urging other women to do the same." Juliana's rebellion is considered one of the first recorded indigenous insurgencies of the era, and her figure is championed by feminist activists and scholars in Paraguay.

=== 1555–1573: After Irala's death ===
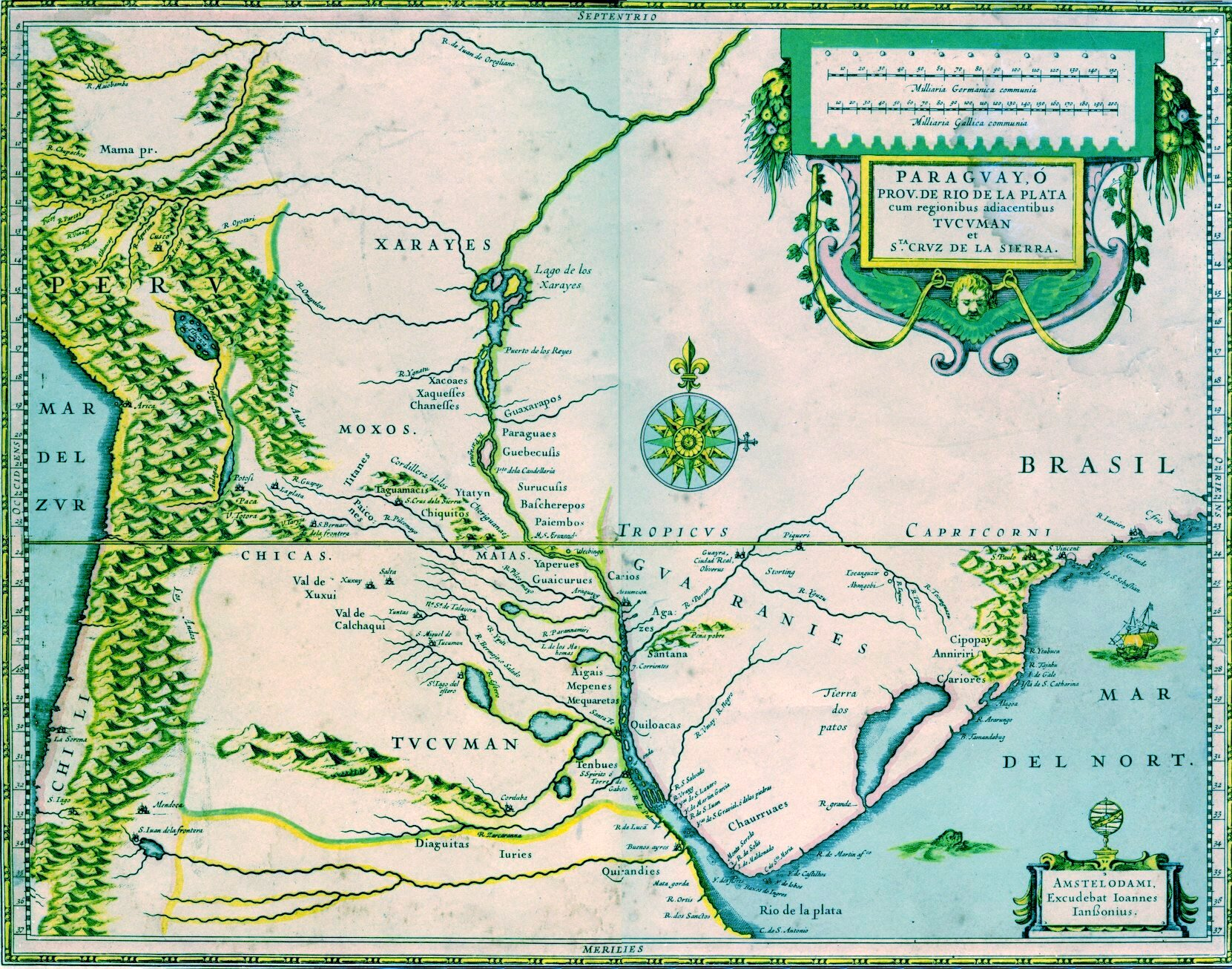
Map of Paraguay, the Río de la Plata basin, and surrounding regions by Jodocus Hondius. c. 1600.

In 1556, Governor Domingo Martínez de Irala died and, before his death, established the encomienda system in the Province of Paraguay, a measure by which the incorporation of indigenous labor into the Spanish colonial administrative system was formalized, nominally putting an end to the rancheadas as a widespread practice. However, the living conditions of indigenous women did not improve significantly with this institutional change, as abusive practices continued outside the existing legislation.

That same year, the first bishop of Paraguay arrived in Asunción, the Franciscan friar Pedro Fernández de la Torre, who for most of his tenure chose to adopt a strategy of rapprochement with the civil authorities and the cabildo, without developing an active policy of protection for the natives. Also in 1556, the cleric Martín González began sending the Spanish Crown a series of letters systematically denouncing the abuses of the colonists against the Indians of the Province, in particular the theft and deportation of indigenous women; in these missives, González was the first to use the term rancheadas to designate the process that had been developing since the beginning of the previous decade.

In 1558, González called on the authorities of the cabildo of Asunción to publish the New Laws, promulgated in Barcelona in 1542, noting that sixteen years after their promulgation these protective ordinances for indigenous people had still not been published or applied in the province. The following year, in a January 1559 letter addressed to Governor Francisco de Vergara, González estimated that violence against indigenous people was widespread: "if I had to name all the people who mistreat them in various ways I could name more than half of the Spaniards in the land."

The legal condition of indigenous women in Asunción's society was illustrated in a 1574 judicial proceeding in which two Cario women, María and Costanza, acted as eyewitnesses in a criminal complaint. However, the judge dismissed their testimonies on the grounds that they were "persons discarded in law" for being servants of the accused, demonstrating that free indigenous women were still excluded from the full protection of Spanish legislation four decades after the founding of the city.

Toward the end of his tenure, in 1573, Fernández de la Torre sent a letter requesting that all indigenous women illegally detained be sought out and returned to their families, expressly citing the case of women held in irons in the houses of Asunción's residents, including a woman or daughter of a principal of the Timbú who was imprisoned in a neighbor's home. The following year, in 1574, González himself described in a new letter to the Crown that Spaniards were going out "onto the roads to take from them the beautiful women they were bringing and their daughters and the beds in which they slept and the blankets with which they covered themselves," even when those women openly professed the Christian faith.

In 1556, González stated that "50,000 women" had been kidnapped over a period of 11 years, while in 1575 he reported for the same period the pillaging of more than "100,000 women and daughters." In that same 1575 letter, by then at the Court in Madrid, González described in detail the physical mistreatment suffered by the women: they were burned with firebrands with their hands and feet bound, had burning irons inserted into them, were flogged and beaten, subjected to exhausting workdays of grinding cane "all day," and if any of them rested, they received blows. These figures, common in the hyperbole of colonial documentation, were intended to impress the Indies authorities following the example of Bartolomé de las Casas and to obtain new protective legislation. Also in that letter, González recorded that the situation had deteriorated to such an extent that when an ecclesiastical judge visited the city, "the fines of chamber and treasury and other costs they collect in Indian women."

== Historical legacy ==
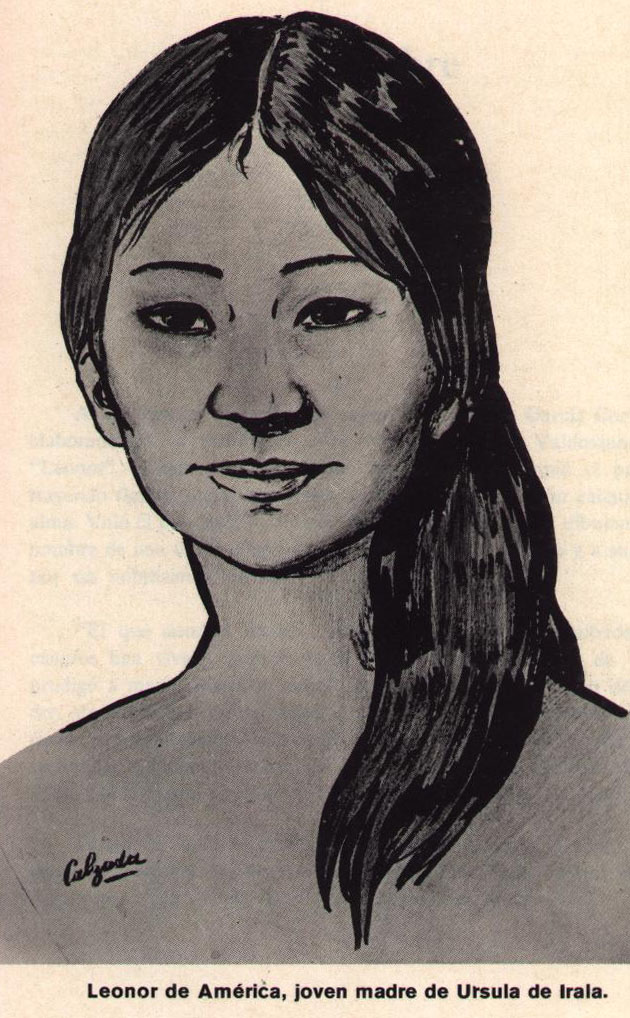
Modern portrait of Leonor, Irala's servant, whose union with him produced Úrsula Irala, one of the first mestizas of Paraguay.

The mestizaje between the Spanish conquistadors and Guaraní women plays a central role in the traditional historiography of Paraguay, which locates in it the origins of the nation, characterizing the Spanish conquest of the region as a harmonious and idealized process in which the Guaraní voluntarily submitted to Hispanic culture and laws. This vision was promoted by the nationalist authors of the early 20th century known as the "generation of 900". Mestizaje is a central characteristic of Paraguayan identity, mentioned in all historical, sociological, and anthropological studies on the subject. However, modern scholars propose a more nuanced analysis of the relations between Spanish men and Cario women. Writing for ABC Color in 2006, historian Ignacio Telesca stated that "there is no need to insist that the famous mancebos de la tierra were not the fruit of relationships of reciprocal exchange, but fundamentally of a forced sexual relationship. The indigenous woman was not only sexually exploited but also economically. Racial and economic violent mestizaje." In that same vein, historian Bárbara Potthast has emphasized that indigenous women "were the most important agents of the sociocultural development of early colonial Paraguayan society," being those who educated the mestizo children and transmitted Guaraní culture, although their recognition in the nationalist discourse has been paradoxical and limited.

On the other hand, several scholars have focused on the Guaraní version of the history of mestizaje and indigenous resistance during the conquest, focusing on narratives transmitted orally. According to the most widespread version, there were two great Guaraní leaders when the Spaniards arrived in Paraguay: Guairá and Paragua. Guairá resisted the conquest, with the present-day Guaraní being descendants of this cacique, while Paragua made a pact with the Spaniards and gave them his women, from which union the first Paraguayans were born, from whom present-day Paraguayans descend. The presence of this account among the Mbayás, who consider themselves descendants of Guairá, has been documented on several occasions. The earliest known version of this story dates from 1956 and was narrated to anthropologist León Cadogan by cacique Pablo Vera of Yro'ysã, Paso Yobái, Guairá Department. Cadogan documented the oral account of caciques Guairá and Paragua on at least three more occasions. Other anthropologists who have recorded this story include Miguel Chase-Sardi, Enrique Amarilla, Guillermo Wilde (though without mentioning whether he heard it from the Guaraní), Ivori José Garlet and Valeria de Assis, Celeste Ciccarone, Giulia Gangemi, Bartomeu Meliá, and Marcelo Bogado, among others. According to the latter:

The stories that the Guaraní tell themselves about Cacique Paragua and Cacique Guairá can be understood less as accounts of historical events that actually happened and more as cases of subaltern memories, which offer them an alternative interpretation of the official history told by those who oppressed them (and continue to do so). (...) In the Guaraní's memory and oral history, the story of Cacique Paragua and Cacique Guairá is found as an account that affirms the group's identity, gives them a sense of belonging, while opposing them to those who according to the account are the descendants of Cacique Paragua, who submitted to the Spaniards, and who therefore would have no kinship ties with them. Regardless of whether the story of Cacique Paragua and Cacique Guairá (in any of its versions) is true or false, what is important is that through it the Guaraní managed to symbolically avoid their incorporation into the Paraguayan nation, which saw in mestizaje its mythical origin.

== See also ==
- Genocide of indigenous peoples in Paraguay
- Indigenous peoples of Paraguay
- History of women
- History of Paraguay (to 1811)
- History of violence against women

== Bibliography ==
- El Jaber, Loreley (2011). Un país malsano: la conquista del espacio en las crónicas del Río de la Plata: siglos XVI y XVII (in Spanish) (1st ed.). Rosario: Beatriz Viterbo Editora, National University of Rosario. ISBN 978-950-845-263-4 – via Academia.edu.
- Godoy, Marilyn (1995). La conquista amorosa en tiempos de Irala (PDF). La mujer paraguaya en el Bicentenario (in Spanish). Asunción: Base Investigaciones Sociales (BASE-IS). ISBN 978-999-530-341-9 – via CLACSO.
- Schmidl, Ulrich (1903) [1599]. Mitre, Bartolomé (ed.). Viaje al Río de la Plata (1534–1554) (in Spanish). Translated by Lafone Quevedo, Samuel Alejandro. Buenos Aires: Cabaut y Cía., Editores – via Biblioteca Virtual Miguel de Cervantes.
