= Komako Kimura =

Japanese suffragist

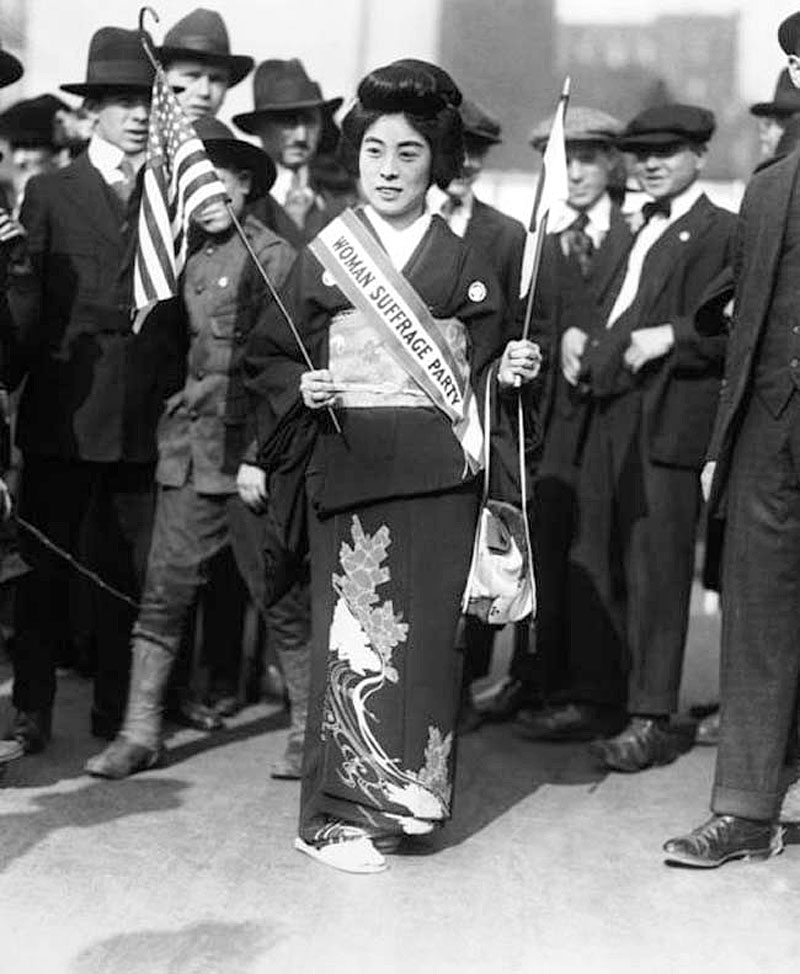
Kimura Komako, in New York in 1917.

Komako Kimura (木村 駒子, Kimura Komako; 1887–1980), also seen as Komaku Kimura or Komago Kimura in American newspapers, was a Japanese suffragist, actress, dancer, theater manager, and magazine editor before World War II. Her work, both literary and theatrical, shaped the women's rights and women's suffrage movement in Japan.

== Early life ==
Komako Kimura was born in Tokyo on July 29, 1887 as the youngest of three sisters. She was educated in the arts from a young age, and started to learn Nihon buyō at three years old and kabuki at five. Her father, who was the chief clerk of a fire-fighting pump dealer, lost all of his money to an extortionate moneylender, forcing him to move to Taiwan to find work and leave the family behind when she was eight years old. Komako used her training in dance and theater to support her family by joining a touring theater in Kumamoto. In her early life, she went to a school founded by Junko Takezaki, where girls were not only encouraged to learn and become good, traditional Japanese wives and mothers, but also how to "be personalities." She was inspired by male thinkers like Goethe, Byron, Maeterlinck, Wilde, and Emerson, after studying them in school. She was also greatly influenced by the ideas of Ellen Key, a Swedish feminist.

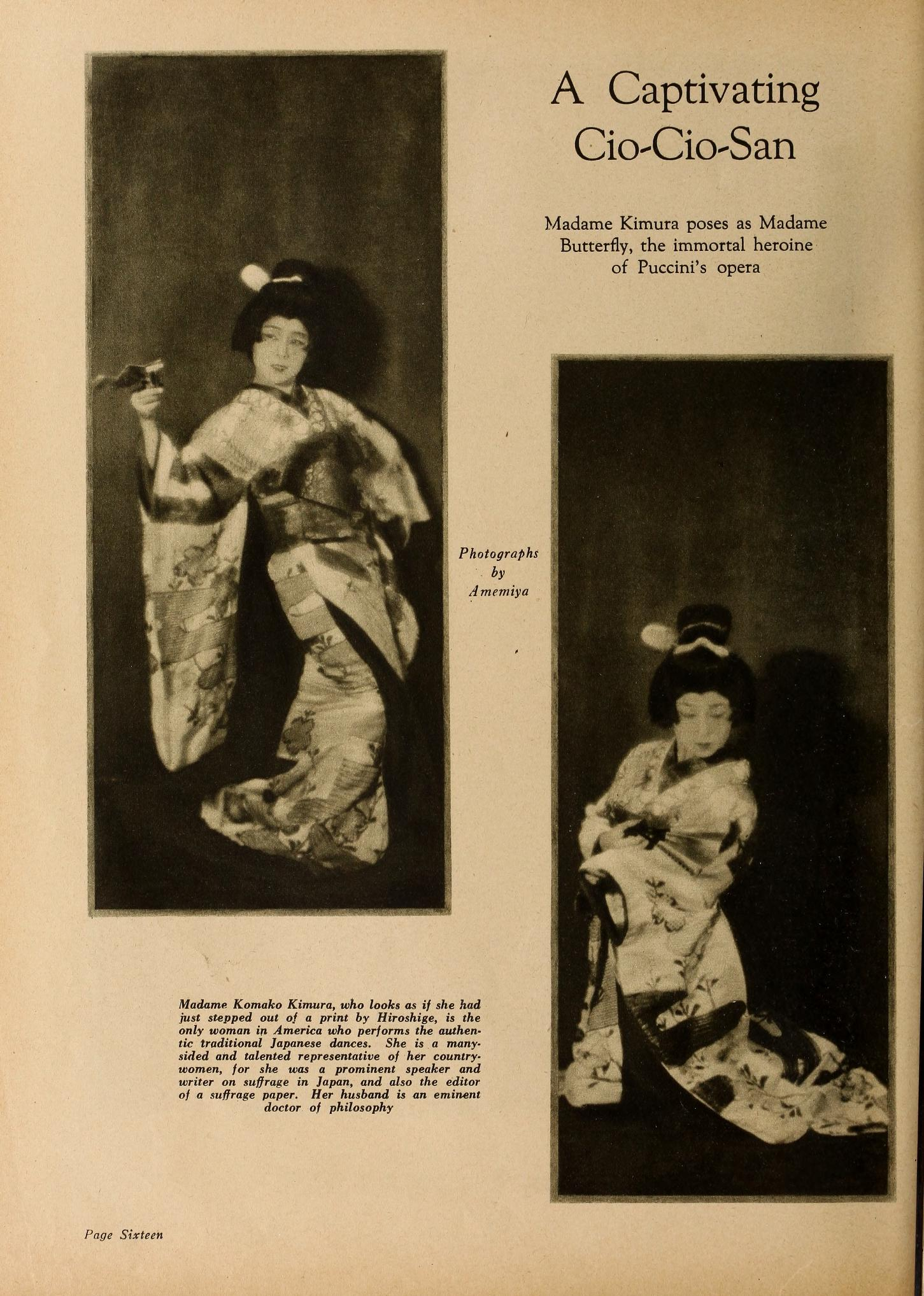
Komako Kimura in Shadowland, 1923

== Career ==
Komako Kimura was controversial in her time for her defiant actions both in her theatrical life and in her work to advance the women’s suffrage movement.

=== Early career ===
Komako Kimura and Kimura Hideo had a child out of wedlock 1908. Komako was ostracized because of this, making it difficult for her to hold down a job. Although she was not a socialist herself, she wanted more openness of thought and art in Japan, so she had been writing for the socialist journal Kumamoto hyóron. However, they did not deign to print her name on articles after January 1908, when her unmarried motherhood became known. Similarly, she was accepted into the Imperial Actresses Training School, but was kicked out once it was made known that she was unmarried and had a child.

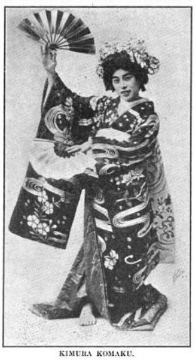
Komako Kimura in Japanese clothing

=== Theater ===
She was the manager of two theaters in Tokyo, the Kimura Komako theater, and the Tokiwaza. She herself performed in 500 plays throughout her lifetime, as Shakespearean heroines and more, like “La Tosca, Monna Vanna, [and] Camille”.

She loved the stage because it was one of the only ways women could flourish in a male-dominated society, as “only the women of the stage have an opportunity to talk to men of affairs,” a designation not even granted to their wives. She was not seen as inferior onstage and after performances. She could speak to and associate to powerful men, who would in turn listen to and be influenced by her opinions.

=== The True New Women's Association ===
Komako Kimura created the movement entitled “The True New Women’s Association” (in Japanese Shin-shinfujinkai) in 1912 with two other women, Nishikawa Fumiko (1882-1960) and Miyazaki Mitsuko, despite their apparently disparate personalities. Together, they created a lecture series and magazine, both entitled “The New True Women” (in Japanese, Shinshinfujin). The first speech that Komako gave occurred in 1913, and was entitled “Love and Self-Realization for Women”. She aimed to circulate “The New True Woman” magazine in America, Japan, and Europe. In her first publication of the magazine, Komako described how she did not just want to change the law and give men and women equal rights on paper. Her goal was to educate women to be strong willed and thoughtful feminists who are provided with an education equal to that of men, and no longer have to refer to the men in their lives to make decisions for themselves.

By the time she visited America in 1917, she had been working toward achieving suffrage in Japan for about five years, to no avail. There were issues about funding, government opposition, and a lack of Japanese precedent concerning the women’s rights movement that prevented Komako from making more progress.

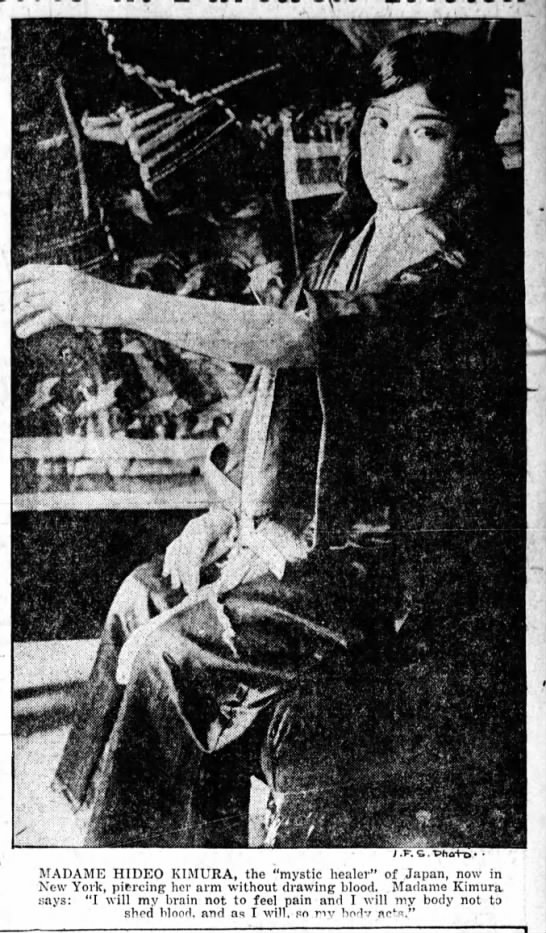
Komako Kimura practicing acupuncture

She was in America to gain inspiration from American women, whom she admired due to the fact that they could use their clothing and makeup to express themselves as individuals. She criticized Japanese society for forcing conformity onto women by making them take an hour to do their hair and clothes, then be unable to move unencumbered throughout the day, due to the restrictive nature of traditional Japanese clothing. During her visit, she met with the first female member of Congress, Jeannette Rankin, as well as President Woodrow Wilson. Also, she famously marched in the October 27, 1917 suffrage march in New York.

=== Controversy and Trial ===
“The New True Woman” magazine lasted until January 1918, before it was suppressed by the Japanese government. The magazine was well known for its radical topics for the time, as it criticized marriage and was the first Japanese publication to frankly talk about the use of birth control.

This suppression also extended to her public lectures, and she was no longer permitted to hold meetings in public areas. In response to the Japanese government’s actions, Komako wrote and acted as the lead in a play entitled “Ignorance.” As expected, the Japanese government was not happy with this action, and advised her to return to playing meek women, else be censured by the closing of her theaters. Instead of doing as the government willed, she defied its cease and desist and made all of the performances at her theater free. In response, the government arrested her. When she was put on trial, she acted as her own defense, and did so so well that instead of hindering her cause, the government unwittingly promoted it, as her message was spread via the trial, making her fight for women’s rights and suffrage known throughout the country.

=== America and Beyond ===
The Kimuras moved to America some time after the trial, and spent eight years living there. During this time, Komako continued to advance her career in acting, as well as advocate for women's suffrage. Most notably, she performed at Carnegie Hall and on Broadway.

They returned to America in 1925, and she wrote several books about meditation and breathing techniques including A Textbook on the Art of Dancing and The Art of Kannon.

== Personal life ==
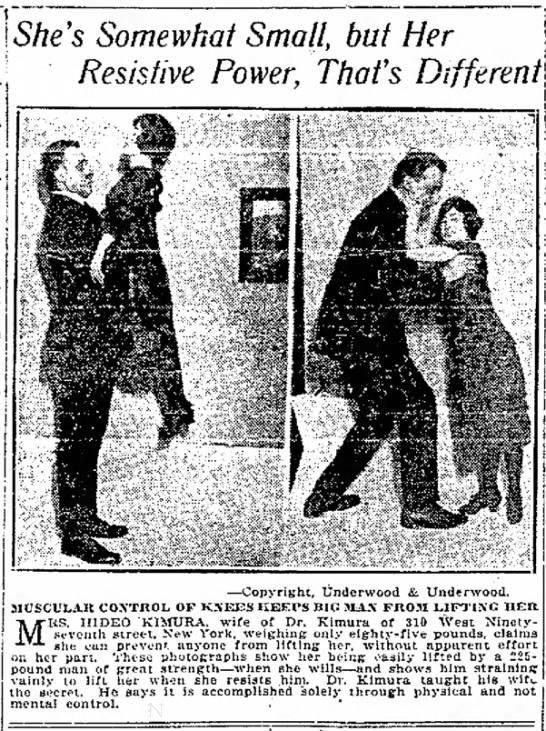
Komako and Hideo Kimura

Komako was nearly married off to a man who offered her parents money to make her his concubine, but she ran away before the marriage occurred. Some sources state that she ran away on her wedding day, but it is unclear if that was sensationalized conjecture for the newspapers. She went on to hold a variety of jobs, from being the first telephone operator in Kumamoto to being a teacher while she was supported by her friend Kimura Bansaku, who became wealthy by making soy sauce. She may have also apprenticed as a geisha in Nagoya for three years during this time. However, she still wanted the exciting and high-profile life of an actress. She fell in love with Bansaku's nephew, a divorcé by the name of Kimura Hideo, who had majored in Religious Studies at UC Berkeley, and then worked in medicine, utilizing strategies such as hypnosis to heal. They had an illegitimate son together in February 1908, who they named Shouji. According to Komako, his name meant "life and death," because "that sums up the story of a human being".

The family moved to Tokyo in May 1909, where they were legally married and had another child by the fall of 1911. Komako took acting classes there, but stopped when her one-year-old daughter died in 1912. The Kimuras moved to New York some time after the 1917 suffrage march, and demonstrated Japanese physical disciplines and conducted religious ceremonies.

== Legacy ==
Komako Kimura's writing, speeches, and performances were integral to the Japanese suffrage movement, which culminated in the 1945 change of election law that allowed Japanese women to vote.

Additionally, her wishes for women to be equal to men being tempered by the gender roles of her era are still discussed in feminist texts and ideas to this day.

An image of Komako Kimura, plus an explanation of her significance, appeared on one of the women's history post cards produced by the Helene Victoria Press set up by Nancy Poore and Jocelyn Cohen in 1973.
