= Nancy Poore =

American editor, writer, and publisher

Nancy Poore (1939–2025) was an American editor, writer, publisher, artist, printer and activist. With Jocelyn H. Cohen, she co-founded the Helaine Victoria Press, notable for its inclusive unearthing of stories and photographs of forgotten heroines and women's movements from around the world and for reproducing these in small, inexpensive formats that could be used, displayed and seen by many. Poore thus contributed to the gradual expansion of knowledge of women's history and the resurrection from obscurity of many individual women and women's organisations.

== Early life and education ==
Poore was born on October 5, 1939, in Chicago, an only child, daughter of Taylor Poore (a graphic designer and artist) and Madge (Shearer) Poore. Her father was friends with artists including Edgar Miller and Sol Kogen. In 1961, she gained a bachelor's degree at Scripps College, Claremont, California. As an undergraduate, Poore studied at the Sorbonne. In 1991, she gained her master's degree in English from Northwestern University. Poore lived in California in the late 1960s and early 1970s and became interested in social justice and, specifically, in feminist causes.

== Activism ==
In 1973, Poore and Jocelyn H Cohen co-founded the Helaine Victoria Press a not-for-profit organisation they set up in Santa Monica, California. The publishing company and press was established to research and print images and stories about unsung heroines, using a vintage letter press. The press, continued this work on women's history for over 17 years, closing down in 1991. The focus of the work was on individuals and movements in women's history, an untapped field necessitating the unearthing of forgotten stories and rare photographs. This was thus a precursor to the Wikipedia Women in Red project. The press's published products, mostly postcards, were small and inexpensive and included women from all racial and socioeconomic groups and the temperance, suffrage and labor movements. The pictures were framed in colored borders appropriate to the era and subject. Informative captions offered details about the lives of the women pictured. The postcards were never intended simply to be interesting images but also to inform. For example, the caption on the back of the Komako Kimura postcard pictured to the right was: "Kimura Komako, shown on a visit to New York in 1917–18. A leading Japanese actress/dancer, Mme. Kimura came to the U.S. mainly to study the methods of American woman suffragists. She organized the first (1913) Japanese suffrage meeting, magazine and society—both called Shin Shin Fujin (New True Woman). It was a courageous, even shocking step, criticized but not given much real public notice. Yet it paved the way for the more famous Akiko Hiratsuka and her colleagues, who stunned the nation in 1920 by petitioning to end an ancient law against women’s participation in political gatherings. They won that round and, in 1946, the franchise. On April 10, 13 million Japanese women voted for the first time in more than 25 centuries as a nation."

The postcards were sold at bookstores, festivals and coffeehouses. The cards, once written on by users and posted, were given circulation and seen by mail carriers and recipients and were often displayed on bulletin boards or refrigerators thus enlarging the collective memory store and consciousness of notable women.

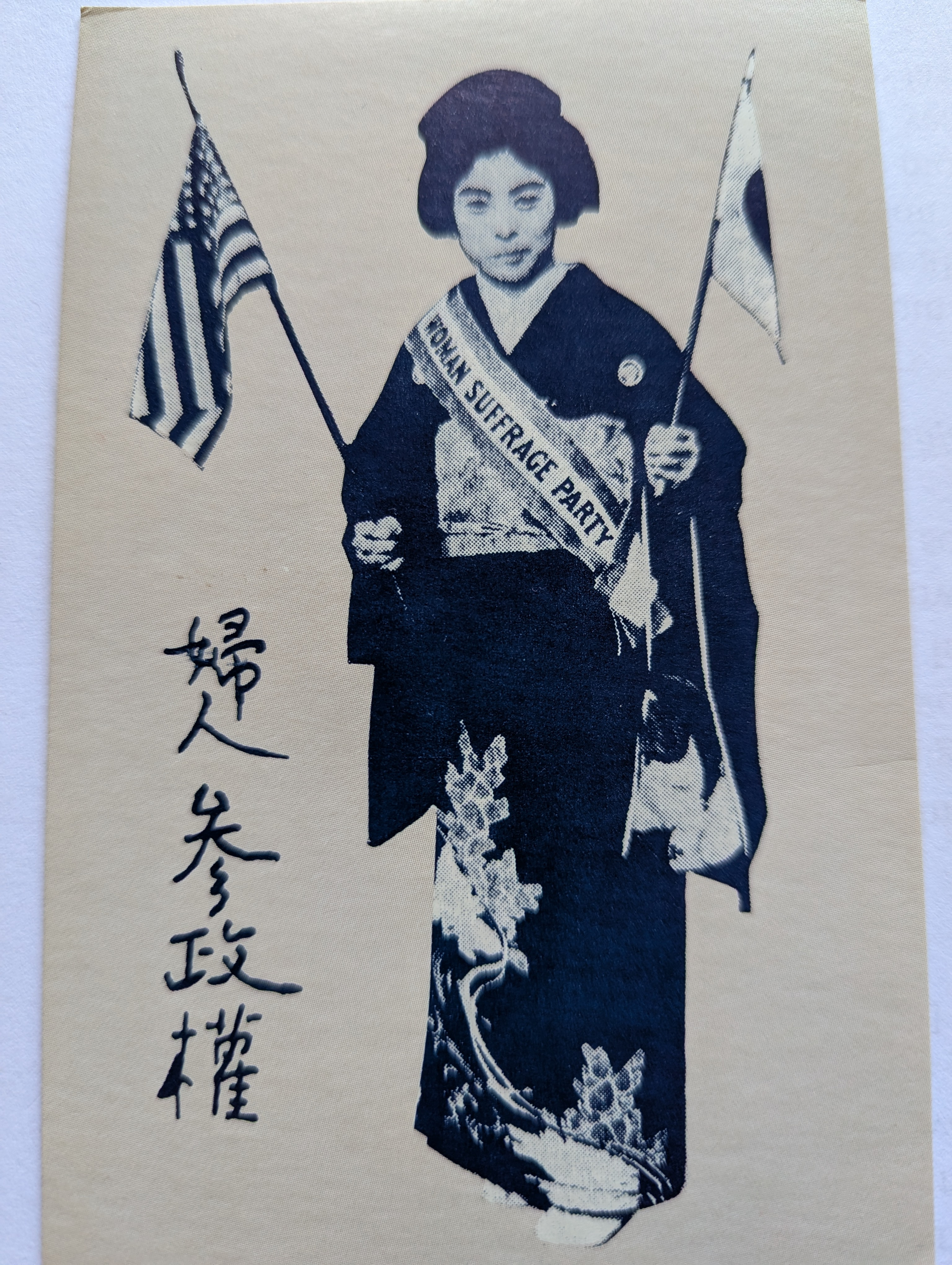
Postcard printed by Helaine Victoria Press showing Kimura Komako on a visit to New York 1917–18.

After Poore and Cohen separated, Poore returned to Chicago where she ran her own editorial, writing, research and design services business for many years as well as working in the journalism department of Northwestern University. In Chicago, Poore had a long time relationship/marriage with Chris Johnson, one of the co-founders of the feminist Metis Press and whom Poore and Cohen had met during their participation in the Women in Print conferences, including the ones in Chicago in 1976 and 1982. Poore volunteered with the Chicago Women's Graphics Collective and became a member of the Metis Press Collective, the Feminist Writers Guild; Black Maria, a Journal of Feminist Literature; and of Feminists in Alternative Business.

== Legacy ==
The work of Poore and Cohen has been written up in a book entitled 'Women Making History: The Revolutionary Feminist Postcard Art of Helaine Victoria Press' by Cohen and her co-author Julia M. Allen. The open access book is available to read on line and contains video and audio files. The postcards and posters produced by the press are also archived at the Sophia Smith Collection of Women's History at Smith College, Schlesinger Library-Radcliffe Institute for Advanced Study and at the Gerber-Hart Library and Archives as well as in other libraries. They include, for example, the postcards portraying Kimura Komako and Irene Herlocker-Meyer. The press set up by Poore and Cohen did more with the postcards than provide a convenient writing surface. It generated feminist memory.

Poore died on July 27, 2025 in Elgin, Illinois. She is survived by her cousins Lois (Patrick) Berg, Celia (Mark) Foster and Marilyn (Don) Thompson, and nephews Ben and Edwin Hunt.
