= History of Paraguay (to 1811) =

Long before Spanish conquistadors discovered Paraguay for King Charles V in 1524, semi-nomadic Chaco Indian tribes populated Paraguay's rugged landscape. Although few relics or physical landmarks remain from these tribes, the fact that nearly 90 percent of Paraguayans still understand the indigenous Guarani language is testament to Paraguay's Indian lineage, even as Spanish influence was accepted and embraced, in other aspects of society. The Spanish founded Asunción in 1537. Paraguay's colonial experience differed from that of neighboring countries, because it did not have gold and other minerals that the Spanish were seeking. Because of its lack of minerals and remoteness, Paraguay remained underpopulated and economically underdeveloped. Early governor Domingo Martínez de Irala took an Indian wife, and a series of Indian concubines, and advised other settlers to do so. Intermarriage fused Indian culture with that of the Europeans, creating a mestizo class that dominates Paraguay today.

Although European fortune seekers headed elsewhere in South America, Jesuits descended on Paraguay, and over generations, transformed the lives of the Guaraní people in eastern Paraguay. By the beginning of the 18th century, about 100,000 of the once polytheistic Indians had converted to Christianity and were residents of Jesuit missions and on surrounding land. This theocratic society endured until 1767, when Spanish authorities expelled Jesuits from Paraguay, fearing that the massive wealth and land accumulated by the Jesuits had made the mission communes (reducciones) an "empire within an empire." In the vacuum left by the Jesuit ouster, the Indians experienced for the first time direct contact with Spanish officials. However, the administrative and military tactics of imperial control proved far less successful and palatable than those of the Jesuits. Tensions between the natives and the Europeans grew steadily during the last years of the 18th century.

== Early explorers and conquistadors ==
The recorded history of Paraguay began indirectly in 1516 with the failed expedition of Juan Díaz de Solís to the Río de la Plata estuary, which divides Argentina and Uruguay. After Solís's death at the hands of Indians, the expedition renamed the estuary Río de Solís and sailed back to Spain. On the home voyage, one of the vessels was wrecked off Santa Catarina Island near the Brazilian coast. Among the survivors was Aleixo Garcia, a Portuguese adventurer who over a period of several years acquired a working knowledge of Guaraní. Garcia was intrigued by reports of "the White King" who, it was said, lived far to the west and governed cities of incomparable wealth and splendor, a reference to the Inca Empire. In 1524, Garcia mustered men and supplies for a trip to the interior and left Santa Catarina with several European companions with the intention of joining or organizing a raid on the dominions of the white king.

Marching westward, Garcia's group discovered Iguazú Falls, crossed the Río Paraná, and arrived at the site of Asunción thirteen years before it was founded. The Guaraní assembled an army of 2,000 warriors to carry out the invasion and set out across the Chaco, a harsh semidesert. In the Chaco, they faced drought, floods, and the warlike and nomadic Guaycuru peoples. Garcia became the first European to cross the Chaco and penetrated the outer defenses of the Inca Empire to the foothills of the Andes Mountains in present-day Bolivia, eight years in advance of Francisco Pizarro. Garcia and the army engaged in plundering and amassed a considerable hoard of silver. Counter-attacks by the army of the reigning Inca, Huayna Cápac, forced the Guaraní and Garcia to withdraw. Indian allies later murdered Garcia and the other Europeans, but news of the raid on the Incas reached the Spanish explorers on the coast and attracted Sebastian Cabot to the Río Paraguay two years later.

The son of the Genoese explorer John Cabot (who had led the first European expedition to North America), Sebastian Cabot was sailing to the Orient in 1526 when he heard of Garcia's exploits. Cabot thought the Río de la Plata might provide easier passage to the Pacific and the Orient than the stormy Straits of Magellan where he was bound, and, eager to win the riches of Peru, he became the first European to explore that estuary.

Leaving a small force on the northern shore of the broad estuary, Cabot proceeded up the Río Paraná uneventfully for about 160 kilometers and founded a settlement he named Sancti Spiritu. He continued upstream for another 800 kilometers, past the junction with the Río Paraguay. When navigation became difficult, Cabot turned back, but only after obtaining some silver objects that the Indians said came from a land far to the west. Cabot retraced his route on the Río Paraná and entered the Río Paraguay. Sailing upriver, Cabot and his men traded freely with the Guaraní tribes until a strong force of Agaces Indians attacked them. About forty kilometers below the site of Asunción, Cabot encountered a tribe of Guaraní in possession of silver objects, perhaps some of the spoils of Garcia's treasure. Hoping he had found the route to the riches of Peru, Cabot renamed the river Río de la Plata, although today the name applies only to the estuary as far inland as the city of Buenos Aires.

Cabot returned to Spain in 1530 and informed Emperor Charles V (1519–56) about his discoveries. Charles gave permission to Don Pedro de Mendoza to mount an expedition to the Plata basin. The emperor also named Mendoza governor of Río de la Plata and granted him the right to name his successor. But Mendoza, a sickly, disturbed man, proved to be utterly unsuitable as a leader, and his cruelty nearly undermined the expedition. Choosing what was possibly the continent's worst site for the first Spanish settlement in South America, in February 1536 Mendoza built a fort at a poor anchorage on the southern side of the Plata estuary on an inhospitable, windswept, dead-level plain where not a tree or shrub grew. Dusty in the dry season, a quagmire in the rains, the place was inhabited by the fierce Querandí tribe that resented having the Spaniards as neighbors. The new outpost was named Buenos Aires (Nuestra Señora del Buen Ayre), although it was hardly a place one would visit for the "good air."

Mendoza soon provoked the Querandís into declaring war on the Europeans. Thousands of them and their Timbú and Charrúa allies besieged the miserable company of half-starved soldiers and adventurers. The Spaniards were soon reduced to eating rats and the flesh of their deceased comrades.

Meanwhile, Juan de Ayolas, who was Mendoza's second-in-command and who had been sent upstream to reconnoitre, returned with a welcome load of corn and news that Cabot's fort at Sancti Spiritu had been abandoned. Mendoza promptly dispatched Ayolas to explore a possible route to Peru. Accompanied by Domingo Martínez de Irala, Ayolas again sailed upstream until he reached a small bay on the Río Paraguay, which he named Candelaria, the present-day Fuerte Olimpo. Appointing Irala his lieutenant, Ayolas ventured into the Chaco and was never seen again.

After Mendoza returned unexpectedly to Spain, two other members of the expedition--Juan de Salazar de Espinosa and Gonzalo de Mendoza—explored the Río Paraguay and met up with Irala. Leaving him after a short time, Salazar and Gonzalo de Mendoza descended the river, stopping at a fine anchorage. They commenced building a fort on August 15, 1537, the date of the Feast of the Assumption, and called it Asunción (Nuestra Señora Santa María de la Asunción). Within 20 years, the settlement had a population of about 1,500. Transcontinental shipments of silver passed through Asunción on their way from Peru to Europe. Asunción subsequently became the nucleus of a Spanish province that encompassed a large portion of southern South America, so large, in fact, that it was dubbed "La Provincia Gigante de Indias." Asunción also was the base from which this part of South America was colonized. Spaniards moved northwestward across the Chaco to found Santa Cruz in Bolivia; eastward to occupy the rest of present-day Paraguay; and southward along the river to refound Buenos Aires, which its defenders had abandoned in 1541 to move to Asunción.

== The young colony ==
Uncertainties over the departure of Pedro de Mendoza led Charles V to promulgate a cédula (decree) that was unique in colonial Latin America. The cédula granted colonists the right to elect the governor of Río de la Plata Province either if Mendoza had failed to designate a successor or if a successor had died. Two years later, the colonists elected Irala as governor. His domain included all of present-day Paraguay, Argentina, Uruguay, most of Chile, as well as large parts of Brazil and Bolivia. In 1542 the province became part of the newly established Viceroyalty of Peru, with its seat in Lima. Beginning in 1559, the Audiencia of Charcas (present-day Sucre, Bolivia) controlled the province's legal affairs.

Irala's rule set the pattern for Paraguay's internal affairs until independence. In addition to the Spaniards, Asunción included people - mostly men - from present-day France, Italy, Germany, England, and Portugal. This community of about 350 chose wives and concubines from among the Guaraní women. Irala had 70 Guaraní concubines (his name fills several pages in the Asunción phone directory), and he encouraged his men to marry Indian women and give up thoughts of returning to Spain. Paraguay soon became a colony of mestizos, and, prompted by Irala's example, the Europeans raised their offspring as Spaniards. Nevertheless, continued arrivals of Europeans allowed for the development of a criollo elite.

The role of indigenous women in this process was neither passive nor consensual. The initial relationship between the Guaraní and the Spaniards was structured through the cuñadazgo, a Guaraní institution by which caciques gave women to newcomers as a form of political alliance. As the Spanish population in Asunción grew, this practice was supplanted by the rancheadas—violent mass seizures of indigenous women, who were bought and sold as currency and exported as slaves to the Portuguese port of São Vicente. The colony's notoriety for sexual license prompted the priest Francisco González de Paniagua to describe Asunción in a 1545 letter as the "paradise of Muhammad." Modern historians characterize the mestizaje that resulted from these unions as a product of sexual and economic exploitation rather than mutual exchange.

The Guaraní, the Cario, Tapé, Itatine, Guarajo, Tupí, and related subgroups, were generous people who inhabited an immense area stretching from the Guyana Highlands in Brazil to the Río Uruguay. Because the Guaraní were surrounded by other hostile tribes, however, they were frequently at war. They believed that permanent wives were inappropriate for warriors, so their marital relations were loose. Some tribes practiced polygamy with the aim of increasing the number of offspring. Chiefs often had twenty or thirty concubines whom they shared freely with visitors, yet they treated their wives well. They often punished adulterers with death. Like the area's other tribes, the Guaraní were cannibals. But they usually ate only their most valiant foes captured in battle in the hope that they would gain the bravery and power of their victims.

In contrast with the hospitable Guaraní, the Chaco tribes, such as the Payaguá (whence the name Paraguay), Guaycuru peoples, including the Mbayá, Abipón, Mocoví, and the Eastern Bolivian Guarani, also called Chiriguanos, were implacable enemies of the whites. Travelers in the Chaco reported that the Indians there were capable of running with incredible bursts of speed, lassoing and mounting wild horses in full gallop, and catching deer bare-handed. Accordingly, the Guaraní accepted the arrival of the Spaniards and looked to them for protection against fiercer neighboring tribes. The Guaraní also hoped the Spaniards would lead them once more against the Incas.

The peace that had prevailed under Irala broke down in 1542 when Charles V appointed Alvar Núñez Cabeza de Vaca, one of the most renowned conquistadors of his age, as governor of the province. Cabeza de Vaca arrived in Asunción after having lived for ten years among the Indians of Florida. Almost immediately, however, the Rio de la Plata Province - now consisting of 800 Europeans - split into 2 warring factions. Cabeza de Vaca's enemies accused him of cronyism and opposed his efforts to protect the interests of the Indians. Cabeza de Vaca tried to placate his enemies by launching an expedition into the Chaco in search of a route to Peru. This move disrupted the Chaco tribes so much that they unleashed a two-year war against the colony, thus threatening its existence. In the colony's first of many revolts against the crown, the settlers seized Cabaza de Vaca, sent him back to Spain in irons, and returned the governorship to Irala.

Irala ruled without further interruption until his death in 1556. In many ways, his governorship was one of the most humane in the Spanish New World at that time, and it marked the transition among the settlers from conquerors to landowners. Irala kept up good relations with the Guaraní, pacified hostile Indians, made further explorations of the Chaco, and began trade relations with Peru. This Basque soldier of fortune saw the beginnings of a textile industry and the introduction of cattle, which flourished in the country's fertile hills and meadows. The arrival of Father Pedro Fernández de la Torre on April 2, 1556, as the first bishop of Asunción marked the establishment of the Roman Catholic Church in Paraguay. Irala presided over the construction of a cathedral, two churches, three convents, and two schools.

Irala eventually antagonized the Indians, however. In the last years of his life, he yielded to pressure from settlers and established the encomienda. Under this system, settlers received estates of land along with the right to the labor and produce of the Indians living on those estates. Although encomenderos were expected to care for the spiritual and material needs of the Indians, the system quickly degenerated into virtual slavery. In Paraguay 20,000 Indians were divided among 320 encomenderos. This action helped spark a full-scale Indian revolt in 1560 and 1561. Political instability began troubling the colony and revolts became commonplace. Also, given his limited resources and manpower, Irala could do little to check the raids of Portuguese marauders along his eastern borders. Still, Irala left Paraguay prosperous and relatively at peace. Although he had found no El Dorado to equal those of Hernán Cortés in Mexico and Pizarro in Peru, he was loved by his people, who lamented his passing.

== Jesuit missions ==
During the next 200 years, the Roman Catholic Church, especially the ascetic members of the Society of Jesus (Jesuits), influenced the colony more strongly than the governors who succeeded Irala. The first Jesuits arrived in 1588, and in 1610 Philip III proclaimed that only the "sword of the word" should be used to subdue Paraguayan Indians. The church granted Jesuits extensive powers to phase out the encomienda system, angering settlers dependent on a continuing supply of Indian labor and concubines. In one of history's greatest experiments in communal living, the Jesuits had soon organized about 100,000 Guaraní in about 20 reducciones (reductions or townships), and they dreamed of a Jesuit empire that would stretch from the Paraguay-Paraná confluence to the coast and back to the Paraná headwaters.

The new Jesuit reducciones, however, were threatened by the slave-raiding mamelucos, or Bandeirantes, who captured Indians and sold them as slaves to planters in Portuguese Brazil. Having depleted the Indian population near Sâo Paulo, they discovered the richly populated reducciones. The Spanish authorities chose not to defend the settlements, and the Jesuits and their thousands of neophytes thus had little means to protect themselves. The mameluco threat ended only after 1639, after the capture of thousands of Indian neophytes, when the viceroy in Peru agreed to allow Indians to bear arms. Well-trained and highly motivated Indian units bloodied the raiders and drove them off. This victory set the stage for the golden age of the Jesuits in Paraguay. Life in the reducciones offered the Guaraní protection from Spanish settlers, and physical security. The reducciones, which became quite wealthy, exported goods and supplied Indian armies.

The reducciones, where the Jesuits sponsored orchestras, musical ensembles and actors' troupes earned praise from some of the leading lights of the French enlightenment, who were not predisposed to favor Jesuits. "By means of religion," d'Alembert wrote, "the Jesuits established a monarchical authority in Paraguay, founded solely on their powers of persuasion and on their lenient methods of government. Masters of the country, they rendered happy the people under their sway; they succeeded in subduing them without ever having recourse to force." And Voltaire called the Jesuit government "a triumph of humanity." To the contrary the detractors say that 'the Jesuits took away the Indians' freedom, forced them to radically change their lifestyle, physically abused them, and subjected them to disease." Moreover, the missions were inefficient and their economic success "depended on subsidies from the Jesuit order, special protection and privileges from the Crown, and the lack of competition". The Jesuits are portrayed as "exploiters" who "sought to create a kingdom independent of the Spanish and Portuguese Crowns."

Because of their success, the Paraguayan Jesuits gained many enemies, and the reducciones fell prey to changing times. During the 1720s and 1730s, Paraguayan settlers rebelled against Jesuit privileges in the Revolt of the Comuneros and the government that protected them. Although this revolt failed, it was one of the earliest and most serious risings against Spanish authority in the New World and caused the crown to question its continued support for the Jesuits. The Jesuit-inspired War of the Seven Reductions (1750–61), increased sentiment in Madrid for suppressing this "empire within an empire." In a move to gain control of the reducciones wealth, the Spanish king Charles III (1759–88), expelled the Jesuits in 1767. Within a few decades of the expulsion, most of what the Jesuits had accomplished was lost. The missions lost their valuables, became mismanaged, and were abandoned by the Guaraní. The Jesuits vanished almost without a trace. Today, a few weed-choked ruins are all that remain of this 160-year period in Paraguayan history.

Despite their efforts the Jesuits could not duplicate their success with the Guarani among the nomadic and semi-nomadic people of western Paraguay, who resisted Spanish settlement and Christianity until the late 18th and 19th century.

== Independence ==
The Viceroyalty of Peru and the Audiencia of Charcas had nominal authority over Paraguay, while Madrid largely neglected the colony. Madrid preferred to avoid the intricacies and the expense of governing and defending a remote colony that had shown early promise but ultimately proved to have dubious value. The governors of Paraguay had no Spanish troops at their disposal and were instead dependent on a militia composed of colonists. Paraguayans took advantage of this situation and claimed that the 1537 cédula gave them the right to choose and depose their governors. The colony, and in particular the Asunción municipal council (cabildo), earned the reputation of being in continual revolt against the crown.

Tensions between royal authorities and settlers came to a head in 1720 over the status of the Jesuits, whose efforts to organize the Indians had denied the settlers easy access to Indian labor. A full-scale rebellion, known as the Comunero Revolt, broke out when the viceroy in Lima reinstated a pro-Jesuit governor whom the settlers had deposed. The revolt was in many ways a rehearsal for the radical events that began with independence in 1811. The most prosperous families of Asunción (whose yerba maté and tobacco plantations competed directly with the Jesuits) initially led this revolt. But as the movement attracted support from poor farmers in the interior, the rich abandoned it and soon asked the royal authorities to restore order. In response, subsistence farmers began to seize the estates of the upper class and drive them out of the countryside. A radical army nearly captured Asunción and was repulsed, ironically, only with the help of Indian troops from the Jesuit reducciones.

The revolt was symptomatic of decline. Since the refounding of Buenos Aires in 1580, the steady deterioration in the importance of Asunción contributed to growing political instability within the province. In 1617 the Río de la Plata Province was divided into two smaller provinces: Paraguay, with Asunción as its capital, and Río de la Plata, with headquarters in Buenos Aires. With this action, Asunción lost control of the Río de la Plata estuary and became dependent on Buenos Aires for maritime shipping. In 1776 the crown created the Viceroyalty of Río de la Plata; Paraguay, which had been subordinate to Lima, now became an outpost of Buenos Aires. Located at the periphery of the empire, Paraguay served as a buffer state. The Portuguese blocked Paraguayan territorial expansion in the north, Indians blocked it - until their expulsion - in the south, and the Jesuits blocked it in the east. Paraguayans were forced into the colonial militia to serve extended tours of duty away from their homes, contributing to a severe labor shortage.

Because Paraguay was located far from colonial centers, it had little control over important decisions that affected its economy. Spain appropriated much of Paraguay's wealth through burdensome taxes and regulations. Yerba maté, for instance, was priced practically out of the regional market. At the same time, Spain was using most of its wealth from the New World to import manufactured goods from the more industrialized countries of Europe, notably Britain. Spanish merchants borrowed from British merchants to finance their purchases; merchants in Buenos Aires borrowed from Spain; those in Asunción borrowed from the porteños (as residents of Buenos Aires were called); and Paraguayan peones (landless peasants in debt to landlords) bought goods on credit. The result was dire poverty in Paraguay and an increasingly impoverished empire.

The French Revolution, the rise of Napoleon Bonaparte, and the subsequent war in Europe inevitably weakened Spain's ability to maintain contact with and defend and control its colonies. When British troops attempted to seize Buenos Aires in 1806, the attack was repulsed by the city's residents, not by Spain. Napoleon's invasion of Spain in 1808, the capture of the Spanish king, Ferdinand VII, and Napoleon's attempt to put his brother, Joseph Bonaparte, on the Spanish throne, severed the major remaining links between metropolis and satellite. Joseph had no constituency in Spanish America. Without a king, the entire colonial system lost its legitimacy, and the colonists revolted. Buoyed by their recent victory over British troops, the Buenos Aires cabildo deposed the Spanish viceroy on May 25, 1810, vowing to rule in the name of Ferdinand VII.

The porteño action had unforeseen consequences for the histories of Argentina and Paraguay. News of the events in Buenos Aires at first stunned the citizens of Asunción, who had largely supported the royalist position. Discontent with the Spanish monarchy was dismissed because of a bigger rivalry with the city of Buenos Aires.

The porteños bungled their effort to extend control over Paraguay by choosing José Espínola y Peña as their spokesman in Asunción. Espínola was "perhaps the most hated Paraguayan of his era," in the words of historian John Hoyt Williams. Espínola's reception in Asunción was less than cordial, partly because he was closely linked to rapacious policies of the ex-governor, Lázaro de Rivera, who had arbitrarily shot hundreds of his citizens until he was forced from office in 1805. Barely escaping a term of exile in Paraguay's far north, Espínola fled back to Buenos Aires and lied about the extent of porteño support in Paraguay, causing the Buenos Aires cabildo to make an equally disastrous move. In a bid to settle the issue by force, the cabildo sent 1,100 troops under General Manuel Belgrano to subdue Asunción. Paraguayan troops soundly thrashed the porteños at Paraguarí and Tacuarí. Officers from both armies, however, fraternized openly during the campaign. From these contacts the Paraguayans came to realize that Spanish dominance in South America was coming to an end, and that they, and not the Spaniards, held the real power.

If the Espínola and Belgrano affairs served to whet nationalist passions in Paraguay, the Paraguayan royalists' ill-conceived actions that followed inflamed them. Believing that the Paraguayan officers who had beaten the porteños posed a direct threat to his rule, Governor Bernardo de Velasco dispersed and disarmed the forces under his command and sent most of the soldiers home without paying them for their eight months of service. Velasco previously had lost face when he fled the battlefield at Paraguarí, thinking Belgrano would win. Discontent spread, and the last straw was the request by the Asunción cabildo for Portuguese military support against Belgrano's forces, who were encamped just over the border in present-day Argentina. Far from bolstering the cabildo's position, this move instantly ignited an uprising and the overthrow of Spanish authority in Paraguay on May 14 and 15, 1811.

== See also ==
- India Juliana
- Indigenous women in the conquest of Paraguay
