= GENESIS =

GENESIS is a project maintained by the Women's Library at London Metropolitan University. It provides an online database and a list of sources with an intent to support research into women's history.

== Database ==
The database consists of descriptions of women's history collections from sources in the UK.

== Guide to Sources ==
The project also provides a Guide to Sources to a large array of websites relating to women's history—both within the UK and internationally.
