= Women's history =

Study of women's role in history

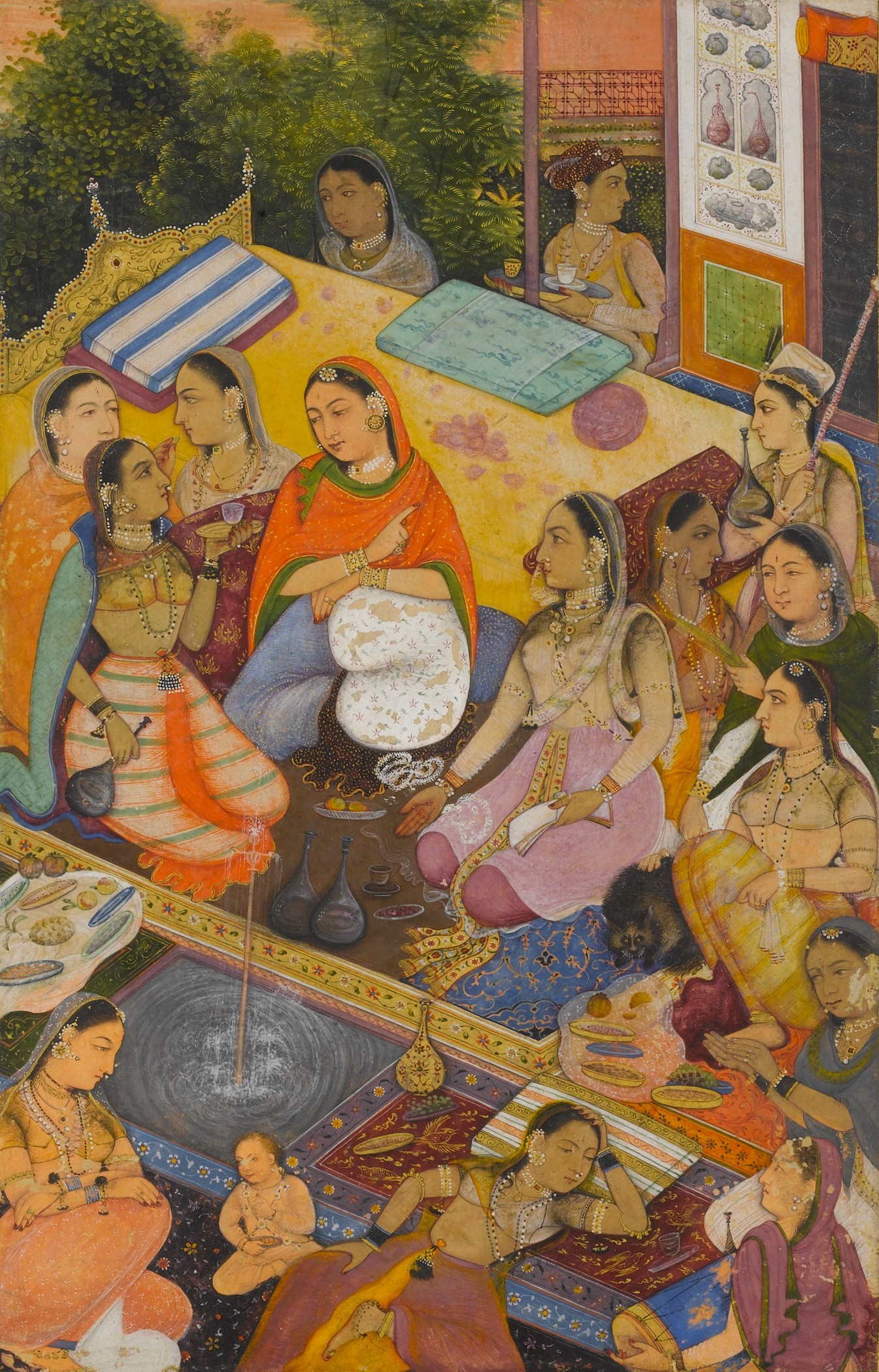
"A Gathering of Court Women", Folio from the Davis Album

Women's history is the study of the role that women have played in history and the methods required to do so. It includes the study of the history of the growth of women's rights throughout recorded history, personal achievements over a period of time, the examination of individual and groups of women of historical significance, and the effect that historical events have had on women. Inherent in the study of women's history is the belief that more traditional recordings of history have minimised or ignored the contributions of women to different fields and the effect that historical events had on women as a whole; in this respect, women's history is often a form of historical revisionism, seeking to challenge or expand the traditional historical consensus.

The main centers of scholarship have been the United States and Britain, where second-wave feminist historians, influenced by the new approaches promoted by social history, led the way. As activists in women's liberation, discussing and analyzing the oppression and inequalities they experienced as women, they believed it imperative to learn about the lives of their fore mothers—and found very little scholarship in print. History was written mainly by men and about men's activities in the public sphere, especially in Africa—war, politics, diplomacy and administration. Women were usually excluded and, when mentioned, were usually portrayed in sex stereotypical roles such as wives, mothers, daughters, and mistresses. The study of history is value-laden in regard to what is considered historically "worthy." Other aspects of this area of study are the differences in women's lives caused by race, economic status, social status, and various other aspects of society.

The study of women's history has evolved over time, from early feminist movements that sought to reclaim the lost stories of women, to more recent scholarship that seeks to integrate women's experiences and perspectives into mainstream historical narratives. Women's history has also become an important part of interdisciplinary fields such as gender studies, women's studies, and feminist theory.

Some key moments in women's history include the suffrage movement, which fought for women's right to vote; the feminist movement of the 1960s and 1970s, which brought attention to issues such as reproductive rights and workplace discrimination; and the #MeToo movement, which has drawn attention to the prevalence of sexual harassment and assault.

Notable women throughout history include political leaders such as Cleopatra, Joan of Arc, and Indira Gandhi; writers such as Jane Austen, Virginia Woolf, and Toni Morrison; activists such as Harriet Tubman, Susan B. Anthony, and Malala Yousafzai; and scientists such as Marie Curie, Rosalind Franklin, and Ada Lovelace.

== Regions ==
=== Europe ===
Changes came in the 19th and 20th centuries; for example, for women, the right to equal pay is now enshrined in law. Women traditionally ran the household, bore and reared the children, were nurses, mothers, wives, neighbours, friends, and teachers. During periods of war, women were drafted into the labor market to undertake work that had been traditionally restricted to men. Following the wars, they invariably lost their jobs in industry and had to return to domestic and service roles.

==== Great Britain ====
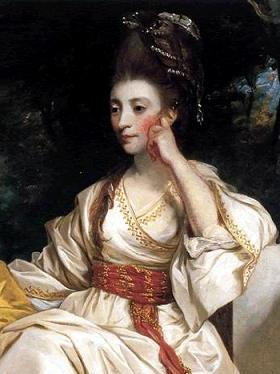
Welsh protofeminist Hester Thrale was one of the first women to publish a history text in English. The book was met with heavy criticism, much of which focused on her gender.

In 1801 the Welsh protofeminist author Hester Thrale published Retrospection..., an attempt to write a popular history from a female perspective. However, the work faced strong criticism with one reviewer calling it "a series of dreams by an old lady." While some of Thrale's contemporaries resented a female writer intruding into the male preserve of history, the Oxford Dictionary of National Biography now states that "it has since been seen as a feminist history, concerned to show changes in manners and mores in so far as they affected women; it has also been judged to anticipate Marxian history in its keen apprehension of reification: 'machines imitated mortals to unhoped perfection, and men found out they were themselves machines.'"

The history of Scottish women in the late 19th century and early 20th century was not fully developed as a field of study until the 1980s. In addition, most work on women before 1700 has been published since 1980. Several studies have taken a biographical approach, but other work has drawn on the insights from research elsewhere to examine such issues as work, family, religion, crime, and images of women. Scholars are also uncovering women's voices in their letters, memoirs, poetry, and court records. Because of the late development of the field, much recent work has been recuperative, but increasingly the insights of gender history, both in other countries and in Scottish history after 1700, are being used to frame the questions that are asked. Future work should contribute both to a reinterpretation of the current narratives of Scottish history and also to a deepening of the complexity of the history of women in late medieval and early modern Britain and Europe.

In Ireland studies of women, and gender relationships more generally, had been rare before 1990; they now are commonplace with some 3000 books and articles in print.

==== France ====
French historians have taken a unique approach: there has been an extensive scholarship in women's and gender history despite the lack of women's and gender study programs or departments at the university level. But approaches used by other academics in the research of broadly based social histories have been applied to the field of women's history as well. The high level of research and publication in women's and gender history is due to the high interest within French society. The structural discrimination in academia against the subject of gender history in France is changing due to the increase in international studies following the formation of the European Union, and more French scholars seeking appointments outside Europe.

==== Germany ====
Before the 19th century, young women lived under the economic and disciplinary authority of their fathers until they married and passed under the control of their husbands. In order to secure a satisfactory marriage, a woman needed to bring a substantial dowry. In the wealthier families, daughters received their dowry from their families, whereas the poorer women needed to work in order to save their wages so as to improve their chances to wed. Under the German laws, women had property rights over their dowries and inheritances, a valuable benefit as high mortality rates resulted in successive marriages. Before 1789, the majority of women lived confined to society's private sphere, the home.

The Age of Reason did not bring much more for women: men, including Enlightenment aficionados, believed that women were naturally destined to be principally wives and mothers. Within the educated classes, there was the belief that women needed to be sufficiently educated to be intelligent and agreeable interlocutors to their husbands. However, the lower-class women were expected to be economically productive in order to help their husbands make ends meet.

In the newly founded German State (1871), women of all social classes were politically and socially disenfranchised. The code of social respectability confined upper class and bourgeois women to their homes. They were considered socially and economically inferior to their husbands. The unmarried women were ridiculed, and the ones who wanted to avoid social descent could work as unpaid housekeepers living with relatives; the ablest could work as governesses or they could become nuns.

A significant number of middle-class families became impoverished between 1871 and 1890 as the pace of industrial growth was uncertain, and women had to earn money in secret by sewing or embroidery to contribute to the family income. In 1865, the Allgemeiner Deutscher Frauenverein (ADF) was founded as an umbrella organization for women's associations, demanding rights to education, employment, and political participation. Three decades later, the Bund Deutscher Frauenverbände (BDF) replaced ADF and excluded from membership the proletarian movement that was part of the earlier group. The two movements had differing views concerning women's place in society, and accordingly, they also had different agendas. The bourgeois movement made important contributions to the access of women to education and employment (mainly office-based and teaching). The proletarian movement, on the other hand, developed as a branch of the Social Democratic Party. As factory jobs became available for women, they campaigned for equal pay and equal treatment. In 1908 German women won the right to join political parties, and in 1918 they were finally granted the right to vote. The emancipation of women in Germany was to be challenged in following years.

Historians have paid special attention to the efforts by Nazi Germany to reverse the political and social gains that women made before 1933, especially in the relatively liberal Weimar Republic. The role of women in Nazi Germany changed according to circumstances. Theoretically, the Nazis believed that women must be subservient to men, avoid careers, devote themselves to childbearing and child-rearing, and be helpmates to the traditional dominant fathers in the traditional family. But, before 1933, women played important roles in the Nazi organization and were allowed some autonomy to mobilize other women. After Hitler came to power in 1933, the activist women were replaced by bureaucratic women, who emphasized feminine virtues, marriage, and childbirth.

As Germany prepared for war, large numbers of women were incorporated into the public sector and, with the need for full mobilization of factories by 1943, all women were required to register with the employment office. Hundreds of thousands of women served in the military as nurses and support personnel, and another hundred thousand served in the Luftwaffe, especially helping to operate the anti-aircraft systems. Women's wages remained unequal and women were denied positions of leadership or control.

More than two million women were murdered in the Holocaust. The Nazi ideology viewed women generally as agents of fertility. Accordingly, it identified the Jewish woman as an element to be exterminated to prevent the rise of future generations. For these reasons, the Nazis treated women as prime targets for annihilation in the Holocaust.

==== Poland ====
Anna Kowalczyk (pl) has written and Marta Frej (pl) has illustrated a book detailing history of Polish women entitled Missing Half of History: A Brief History of Women in Poland (Brakująca połowa dziejów. Krótka historia kobiet na ziemiach polskich), published in 2018 by Wydawnictwo W.A.B. (pl).

==== Eastern Europe ====
Interest in the study of women's history in Eastern Europe has been delayed. Representative is Hungary, where the historiography has been explored by Petö and Szapor (2007). Academia resisted incorporating this specialized field of history, primarily because of the political atmosphere and a lack of institutional support. Before 1945, historiography dealt chiefly with nationalist themes that supported the anti-democratic political agenda of the state. After 1945, academia reflected a Soviet model. Instead of providing an atmosphere in which women could be the subjects of history, this era ignored the role of the women's rights movement in the early 20th century. The collapse of Communism in 1989 was followed by a decade of promising developments in which biographies of prominent Hungarian women were published, and important moments of women's political and cultural history were the subjects of research. However, the quality of this scholarship was uneven and failed to take advantage of the methodological advances in research in the West. In addition, institutional resistance continued, as evidenced by the lack of undergraduate or graduate programs dedicated to women's and gender history at Hungarian universities.

===== Russia =====
Women's history in Russia started to become important in the Czarist era, and concern was shown in the consciousness and writing of Alexander Pushkin. During the Soviet Era, feminism was developed along with ideals of equality, but in practice and in domestic arrangements, men often dominate.

By the 1990s new periodicals, especially Casus and Odysseus: Dialogue with Time, Adam and Eve stimulated women's history and, more recently, gender history. Using the concept of gender has shifted the focus from women to socially and culturally constructed notions of sexual difference. It has led to deeper debates on historiography and holds a promise of stimulating the development of a new "general" history able to integrate personal, local, social, and cultural history.

=== Asia and Pacific ===
General overviews of women in Asian history are scarce, since most specialists focus on China, Japan, India, Korea or another traditionally defined region.

==== China ====
Published work generally deals with women as visible participants in the revolution, employment as vehicles for women's liberation, Confucianism and the cultural concept of family as sources of women's oppression. While rural marriage rituals, such as bride price and dowry, have remained the same in form, their function has changed. This reflects the decline of the extended family and the growth in women's agency in the marriage transaction. In recent scholarship in China, the concept of gender has yielded a bounty of new knowledge in English- and Chinese-language writings.

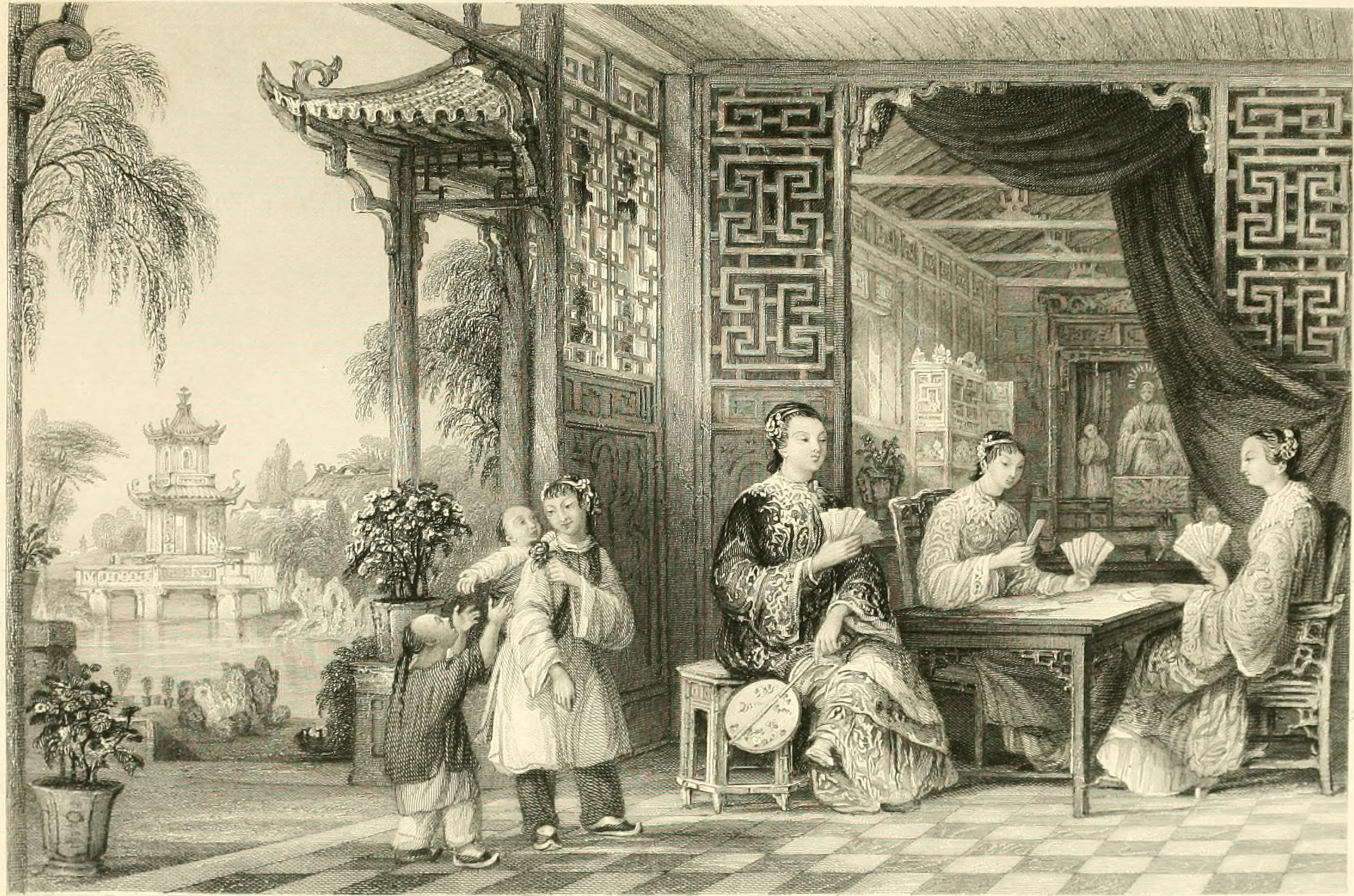
Ladies of a Mandarin's Family at Cards, Thomas Allom; G. N. Wright (1843). China, in a Series of Views, Displaying the Scenery, Architecture, and Social Habits of That Ancient Empire. Vol. 3. p. 18

Zhongguo fu nü sheng Huo shi (simplified Chinese: 中国妇女生活史; traditional Chinese: 中國婦女生活史; pinyin: Zhōngguó Fùnǚ Shēnghuó Shǐ; lit. 'Chinese Women's Life History') is a historical book written by Chen Dongyuan in 1928 and published by The Commercial Press in 1937. The book, the first to give a systematic introduction to women's history in China, has strongly influenced further research in this field.

The book sheds a light on Chinese women's life ranging from ancient times (prior to Zhou dynasty) to the Republic of China. In the book, sections are separated based on dynasties in China. Sections are divided into segments to introduce different themes, such as marriage, feudal ethical codes, education for women, virtues, positions, the concept of chastity, foot-binding and women's rights movement in modern China. Inspired by the anti-traditional thoughts in New Culture Movement, the author devoted much effort to disclosing and denouncing the unfairness and suppression in culture, institutions, and life that victimize women in China. According to the book, women's conditions are slightly improved until modern China. In the Preface of the book, the author writes: since women in China are always subject to abuse, the history of women is, naturally the history of abuse of women in China. The author revealed the motivation: the book intends to explain how the principle of women being inferior to men evolves; how the abuse to women is intensified over time; and how the misery on women's back experience the history change. The author wants to promote women's liberation by revealing the political and social suppression of women.

Mann (2009) explores how Chinese biographers have depicted women over two millennia (221 BCE to 1911), especially during the Han dynasty. Zhang Xuecheng, Sima Qian, and Zhang Huiyan and other writers often study women of the governing class, and their representation in domestic scenes of death in the narratives and in the role of martyrs.

===== Tibet =====
The historiography of women in the history of Tibet confronts the suppression of women's histories in the social narratives of an exiled community. McGranahan (2010) examines the role of women in the 20th century, especially during the Chinese invasion and occupation of Tibet. She studies women in the Tibetan resistance army, the subordination of women in a Buddhist society, and the persistent concept of menstrual blood as a contaminating agent. 1998

==== Japan ====
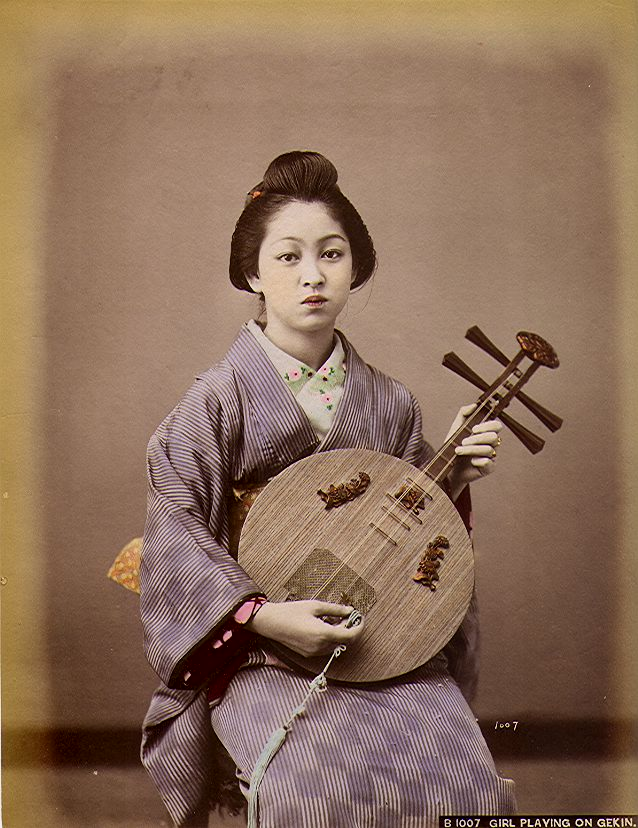
Japanese girl playing on gekin, Baron Raimund von Stillfried und Rathenitz (1839–1911)

Japanese women's history was marginal to historical scholarship until the late 20th century. The subject hardly existed before 1945, and, even after that date, many academic historians were reluctant to accept women's history as a part of Japanese history. The social and political climate of the 1980s in particular, favorable in many ways to women, gave opportunities for Japanese women's historiography and also brought the subject fuller academic recognition. Exciting and innovative research on Japanese women's history began in the 1980s. Much of this has been conducted not only by academic women's historians, but also by freelance writers, journalists, and amateur historians; that is, by people who have been less restricted by traditional historical methods and expectations. The study of Japanese women's history has become accepted as part of the traditional topics.

==== Australia and New Zealand ====
Records of women's history in Australia or New Zealand before the 1970s are scarce.

New Zealand was the first country to give women the vote. Women's history as an academic discipline emerged in Australia in the mid-1970s, typified by Miriam Dixson's The Real Matilda: Woman and Identity in Australia, 1788 to the Present (1976). In New Zealand, in common with developments in the United States and Britain, there was a movement towards gender studies, with the field being dominated by feminists.

=== Middle East ===
==== Development of the field ====
Middle Eastern women's history as a field is still developing, but expanding swiftly. Scholarship first began to appear in the 1930s and 1940s, and then further developed in the 1980s. The earliest historical research in the west came from Gertrude Stern (Marriage in Early Islam), Nabia Abbott (Aishah, the Beloved of Muhammed and Two Queens of Bagdad), and Ilse Lichtenstädter (Women in the Aiyam al-Arab: A Study of Female Life during Warfare in Preislamic Arabia). Following a relatively dormant period, the western version of the discipline became revitalized by the feminist movement, which renewed interest in filling gendered gaps in historical narratives. Numerous studies were published during this period, a trend which has continued and even accelerated into the twenty-first century.

==== Pre-modern Middle East ====
Scholarship on the Middle East before the 1800s has suffered from the limited number direct records of women's lives during ancient and medieval periods. Since the vast majority of historical information has come from male authors and is primarily focused on men, accounts and data which are authored by and center on women are rare. Much of what has been synthesized has come from art, court records, religious doctrine, and other mentions. Researchers have made particular use of court records from the Ottoman Empire. Despite relative sparseness, valuable sources have been identified, and historians have been able to publish recounts of women's social, economic, political, and cultural involvement. Marten Sol's 1999 Women in the Ancient Near East offers a comprehensive overview of women's lives in ancient Babylonia and Mesopotamia. Topics include, but are not limited to, dress, marriage, slavery, sexual autonomy, employment, and religious involvement. Amira El-Azhary Sonbol's Beyond the Exotic: Women's Histories in Islamic Societies brings together twenty-four historians' essays on sources that can be used to fill gaps in conventional historical narratives. Among the essays, analyses of women's legal statuses, patronage of arts, and religious involvement according to region figure prominently.

==== Modern Middle East ====
The information available on women dating after the 1800s is much more robust, and this has led to better-developed histories of multiple Middle Eastern peoples. Similarly to scholarship of the ancient and medieval Middle East, many researchers have drawn from the later Ottoman Empire, this time to discuss the lives and roles of women during the 19th and early 20th centuries. Judith E. Tucker, in Women in the Middle East and North Africa: Restoring Women to History, emphasizes the ways in which changes in the geopolitical and economic landscapes of the 19th century influenced women's lives and roles in Middle Eastern society. At the same time, she also argues that there is not a clear divide between the way societies were structured before and after modernization began to creep over the world. It is also important, according to Tucker, that scholars keep in mind the differing rates of influence other countries and global dynamics exerted according to region and time period in the Middle East, over the course of the 19th and 20th centuries.

Across all time periods, the Middle East has been a large region of multiple countries and numerous groups, and scholars have generated research on a wide variety of specific peoples and places, both pre-modern and modern. For example, Women in Middle Eastern History: Shifting Boundaries of Sex and Gender covers research that ranges from women's agency in Mamluk Egypt and in the 19th century Ottoman Empire to Islamic societies' adaptations to intersex people to demonstrate the flexibility of Middle Eastern societies. In addition, Gender, Religion, and Change in the Middle East compiles research on various phenomena in the mid-20th century, including: women's integration into student bodies at the American University of Beirut; women's organization of social welfare services in Egypt; the relationship between the Israeli-Palestinian conflict and Israeli women's roles and rights in the military and society; and Muslim women's organization of sofre, or women-only "ceremonial votive meals," dedicated to Shiite saints. In Palestinian Women's Activism: Nationalism, Secularism, Islamism, Islah Jad relays the developments and conflicts associated with women's movements in Palestine from the 1930s to early 2000s, placing particular emphasis on the relationship between Islamic and secularist groups of women activists.

==== Issues ====
===== Perceptions of Islam =====
Islam is often framed by historians as having a profound influence on many women's lives throughout Middle Eastern history. Many researchers have dedicated special attention to changes brought about after the rise of Islam, as well as specific ways in which women's lives were shaped by Islamic law and custom. However, historians are somewhat split in their interpretations on the role of Islam in mediating women's oppression since its development, with particular controversy arising in the west. Nikki R. Keddie explains that histories developed on Middle Eastern women are often written in response or reaction to historical geopolitical tension between Middle Eastern and western countries, the latter of which frequently stereotype Middle Eastern cultures as problematic based on Islam's supposed oppression of women. Scholarship on women, particularly the Muslim majority of most Middle Eastern countries, may either be hostile to or aim to defend Islam's influence on women's status. She identifies a spectrum approaches to Islam among scholars, ranging between potentially extreme forms of criticism and defense.

For example, Ida Lichter's Muslim Women Reformers takes a critical approach to gender relations in Muslim majority countries. In her introduction Lichter writes that in comparison to "liberated women in the west," it seems that Muslim women are contending with "a medieval environment of cultural restrictions and misogynistic regulations scripted by religious and patriarchal authorities intent on impounding women's lives." Lichter maintains that the women's rights activists she covers in the book are striving justly against harsh oppression by Islamic extremist groups, and of that this is important because these groups pose a threat not just to women in Muslim countries, but women everywhere.

At the same time, multiple scholars assert that a large part of women's statuses in Middle Eastern society were dictated by the socioeconomic and political landscape of the specific time and region, and not necessarily by religion. This idea is supported by Crocco et al.'s "At the Crossroads of the World: Women of the Middle East", Okkenhaug and Flaskerud's Gender, Religion, and Change in the Middle East, and Keddie and Baron's Women in Middle Eastern History: Shifting Boundaries of Sex and Gender. Crocco et al. argue, from a pedagogical perspective, that Middle Eastern women's history needs to be regarded and taught not only as the history of Islam's impacts on women in the Middle East, but also the history of Christianity's and Judaism's impacts on their respective minority communities, and of the roles that class, political status, and economics have played in women's lives. They also assert that while religions, particularly Islam, have been viewed as sources of patriarchy, instances of women's subordination can be traced back to the development of settled agricultural societies and the advent of property, which motivated the careful control of women's reproduction to ensure inheritance stayed within families.

===== Orientalism =====
A central concern in the development Middle Eastern studies is orientalism, or the tendency of western groups to view civilizations in African and Asia as backwards, exotic, and underdeveloped. Keddie and Anne Chamberlain describe this approach to the so-called "Orient" as being heavily entangled with western interpretations of Middle Eastern women's roles in their families and societies. Multiple authors, including Chamberlain, criticize approaches to Middle Eastern gender relations which rely on narratives of female oppression and victimization, as well as perhaps over-confidence in western feminist thought. Chamberlain offers an alternative interpretation of women's empowerment in Middle Eastern countries in her book The Veil in the Looking Glass: A History of Women's Seclusion in the Middle East.

===== Applicability of western feminism =====
Several authors link discussions of orientalism with the issue of translating western feminist discourses to women's historiography in the Middle East. Meriwether writes that while the discipline is gaining momentum in countries such as the U.S., Middle Eastern women's history is not as robust of a field in the countries it concerns itself with. She argues that western notions of feminism rely on cultural values which do not necessarily align with those other countries', and the impetus for much of the scholarship that has occurred in western countries does not translate perfectly into the academic landscape of the Middle East. She also argues that the complex relationships between gender, colonialism, and class and ethnic relations in Middle Eastern localities create very different climates for the development of women's histories compared with those of (at least mainstream) feminism in the west.

In response to potentially narrow focus of western feminism, Liat Kozma proposes a shift toward transnational feminism. She also advocates for collaboration between scholars who specialize in Middle Eastern history and who specialize in gender, respectively. She argues that this can help to center Middle Eastern women's history specifically, thus helping to counter its marginalization both in gender- and Middle Eastern-focused scholarship.

=== Africa ===
Numerous short studies have appeared for women's history in African nations. Several surveys have appeared that put the sub-Sahara Africa in the context of women's history.

There are numerous studies for specific countries and regions, such as Nigeria. and Lesotho.

Scholars have turned their imagination to innovative sources for the history of African women, such as songs from Malawi, weaving techniques in Sokoto, and historical linguistics.

Prior to the colonial era reigning across the continent of Africa, some systems and societies were matriarichal. The woman carried and represented herself as equal and even superior to the man. Leading the continent to prosper and flourish. By bringing an oppressive form of Christianity to Africa, European colonizers altered its trajectory by introducing and imposing patriarchal ideals and systems to replace the matriarchy that had aided in upbringing the African continent.

At the First Floor Art Gallery in Zimbabwe, feminist artist Lauren Webber works on traditional fabrics and materials to expose and showcase the continent's long history of female dominance

=== Americas ===
==== United States of America ====
Apart from individual women, working largely on their own, the first organized systematic efforts to develop women's history came from the United Daughters of the Confederacy (UDC) in the early 20th century. It coordinated efforts across the South to tell the story of the women on the Confederate home front, while the male historians spent their time with battles and generals. The women emphasized female activism, initiative, and leadership. They reported that when all the men left for war, the women took command, found ersatz and substitute foods, rediscovered their old traditional skills with the spinning wheel when factory cloth became unavailable, and ran all the farm or plantation operations. They faced danger without having menfolk in the traditional role of their protectors. Historian Jacquelyn Dowd Hall argue that the UDC was a powerful promoter of women's history:

UDC leaders were determined to assert women's cultural authority over virtually every representation of the region's past. This they did by lobbying for state archives and museums, national historic sites, and historic highways; compiling genealogies; interviewing former soldiers; writing history textbooks; and erecting monuments, which now moved triumphantly from cemeteries into town centers. More than half a century before women's history and public history emerged as fields of inquiry and action, the UDC, with other women's associations, strove to etch women's accomplishments into the historical record and to take history to the people, from the nursery and the fireside to the schoolhouse and the public square.

The work of women scholars was ignored by the male-dominated history profession until the 1960s, when the first breakthroughs came. Gerda Lerner in 1963 offered the first regular college course in women's history. The field of women's history exploded dramatically after 1970, along with the growth of the new social history and the acceptance of women into graduate programs in history departments. In 1972, Sarah Lawrence College began offering a Master of Arts Program in Women's History, founded by Gerda Lerner, which was the first American graduate degree in the field. In 1973, Nancy Poore and Jocelyn Cohen set up the Helene Victoria Press researching and printing inclusive images and stories about unsung heroines. An important development was to integrate women into the history of race and slavery. A pioneering effort was Deborah Gray White's 'Ar'n't I a Woman? Female Slaves in the Plantation South (1985), which helped to open up analysis of race, slavery, abolitionism, and feminism, as well as resistance, power, and activism, and themes of violence, sexualities, and the body. It is also White who has brought up the subject of women's presence in historical archives. Speaking on the absence black women specifically in historical narratives she says "black people have an oral tradition sustained by almost 300 years of illiteracy in America." There has been an increase in women within archival repositories which means people are finding it is a more important area of study. A major trend in recent years has been to emphasize a global perspective. Although the word "women" is the eighth most commonly used word in abstracts of all historical articles in North America, it is only the twenty-third most used word in abstracts of historical articles in other regions. Furthermore, "gender" appears about twice as frequently in American history abstracts compared to abstracts covering the rest of the world.

In recent years, historians of women have reached out to web-oriented students. Examples of these outreach efforts are the websites Women and Social Movements in the United States, maintained by Kathryn Kish Sklar and Thomas Dublin. and Click! The Ongoing Feminist Revolution.

=== Pre-revolution ===
In the Ancien Régime in France, few women held any formal power; some queens did, as did the heads of Catholic convents. In the Enlightenment, the writings of philosopher Jean Jacques Rousseau provided a political program for reform of the ancien régime, founded on a reform of domestic mores. Rousseau's conception of the relations between private and public spheres is more unified than that found in modern sociology. Rousseau argued that the domestic role of women is a structural precondition for a "modern" society.

Salic law prohibited women from rule; however, the laws for the case of a regency, when the king was too young to govern by himself, brought the queen into the centre of power. The queen could ensure the passage of power from one king to another—from her late husband to her young son—while simultaneously assuring the continuity of the dynasty.

== Themes ==
=== Rights and equality ===
Women's rights refers to the social and human rights of women. In the United States, the abolition movements sparked an increased wave of attention to the status of women, but the history of feminism reaches to before the 18th century. (See protofeminism.) The advent of the reformist age during the 19th century meant that those invisible minorities or marginalized majorities were to find a catalyst and a microcosm in such new tendencies of reform. The earliest works on the so-called "woman question" criticized the restrictive role of women, without necessarily claiming that women were disadvantaged or that men were to blame.

Parliamentary representation began in the early 20th century. In 1900 no woman had ever been elected to the national legislature. Finland broke through in 1907. By 1945 representation averaged three percent; by 2015, it reached 20 percent.

In Britain, the Feminism movement began in the 19th century and continues in the present day. Simone de Beauvoir wrote a detailed analysis of women's oppression in her 1949 treatise The Second Sex. It became a foundational tract of contemporary feminism. In the late 1960s and early 1970s, feminist movements, such as the one in the United States substantially changed the condition of women in the Western world. One trigger for the revolution was the development of the birth control pill in 1960, which gave women access to easy and reliable contraception in order to conduct family planning.

=== Capitalism ===
Women's historians have debated the impact of capitalism on the status of women. Taking a pessimistic side, Alice Clark argued that when capitalism arrived in 17th century England, it made a negative impact on the status of women as they lost much of their economic importance. Clark argues that in the 16th century England, women were engaged in many aspects of industry and agriculture. The home was a central unit of production and women played a vital role in running farms, and in some trades and landed estates. Their useful economic roles gave them a sort of equality with their husbands. However, Clark argues, as capitalism expanded in the 17th century, there was more and more division of labor with the husband taking paid labor jobs outside the home, and the wife reduced to unpaid household work. Middle-class and women were confined to an idle domestic existence, supervising servants; lower-class women were forced to take poorly paid jobs. Capitalism had a negative effect on many women. In a more positive interpretation, Ivy Pinchbeck argues that capitalism created the conditions for women's emancipation. Tilly and Scott have to emphasize the continuity and the status of women, finding three stages in European history. In the preindustrial era, production was mostly for home use and women produce much of the needs of the households. The second stage was the "family wage economy" of early industrialization, the entire family depended on the collective wages of its members, including husband, wife and older children. The third or modern stage is the "family consumer economy," in which the family is the site of consumption, and women are employed in large numbers in retail and clerical jobs to support rising standards of consumption.

=== Employment ===
The 1870 US census was the first to count "Females engaged in each and every occupation" and provides a snapshot of women's history. It reveals that, contrary to popular myth, not all American women of the Victorian period were "safe" in their middle-class homes or working in sweatshops. Women composed 15% of the total workforce (1.8 million out of 12.5). They made up one-third of factory "operatives," and were concentrated in teaching, as the nation emphasized expanding education; dressmaking, millinery, and tailoring. Two-thirds of teachers were women. They also worked in iron and steel works (495), mines (46), sawmills (35), oil wells and refineries (40), gas works (4), and charcoal kilns (5), and held such surprising jobs as ship rigger (16), teamster (196), turpentine laborer (185), brass founder/worker (102), shingle and lathe maker (84), stock-herder (45), gun and locksmith (33), hunter and trapper (2). There were five lawyers, 24 dentists, and 2,000 doctors.

=== Education for girls ===
Educational aspirations were on the rise and were becoming increasingly institutionalized in order to supply the church and state with the functionaries to serve as their future administrators. Girls were schooled too, but not to assume political responsibility. Girls were ineligible for leadership positions and were generally considered to have an inferior intellect to their brothers. France had many small local schools where working-class children – both boys and girls – learned to read, the better "to know, love, and serve God." The sons and daughters of the noble and bourgeois elites were given gender-specific educations: boys were sent to upper school, perhaps a university, while their sisters – if they were lucky enough to leave the house – would be sent to board at a convent with a vague curriculum. The Enlightenment challenged this model, but no real alternative was presented for female education. Only through education at home were knowledgeable women formed, usually to the sole end of dazzling their salons.

=== Marriage ages ===
Marriage ages of women can be used as an indicator of the position of women in society. Women's age at marriage could influence economic development, partly because women marrying at higher ages had more opportunities to acquire human capital. On average, across the world, marriage ages of women have been rising. However, countries such as Mexico, China, Egypt, and Russia have shown a smaller increase in this measure of female empowerment than, for example, Japan.

=== Sex and reproduction ===
In the history of sex, the social construction of sexual behavior—its taboos, regulation and social and political effects—has had a profound effect on women in the world since prehistoric times. Absent assured ways of controlling reproduction, women have practiced abortion since ancient times; many societies have also practice infanticide to ensure the survival of older children. Historically, it is unclear how often the ethics of abortion (induced abortion) was discussed in societies. In the latter half of the 20th century, some nations began to legalize abortion. This controversial subject has sparked heated debate and in some cases, violence, as different parts of society have different social and religious ideas about its meaning.

Women have been exposed to various tortuous sexual conditions and have been discriminated against in various fashions in history. In addition to women being sexual victims of troops in warfare, an institutionalized example was the Japanese military enslaving native women and girls as comfort women in military brothels in Japanese-occupied countries during World War II.

Particularly, Black Women have been the most affected by hyper-sexualization, body policing, and sexual assault throughout time. Specifically during slavery, Black women were used both as human tools, as well as sexual devices for their white slave-masters. Such conditions continue to permeate in American society beyond slavery and the Jim Crow era. Black women have been conditioned to be silent on their experiences with sexual assault as a means of survival in a society that devalues their whole experience as a Black woman. This stems from the roots of slavery, where Black women were both dehumanized by society, while also being labeled as sexual, and deserving of sexual abuse.

=== Clothing ===
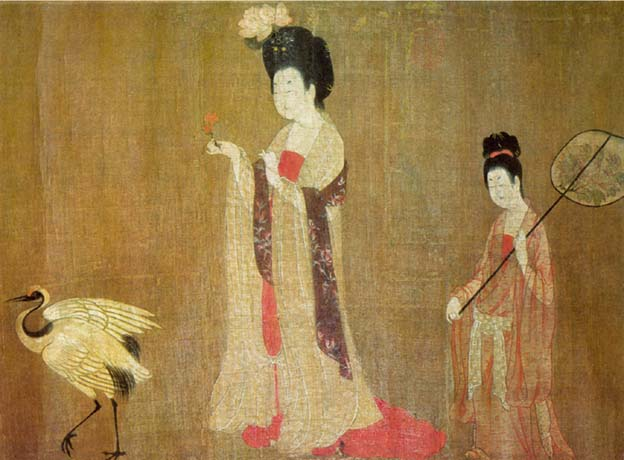
Beauties Wearing Flowers, by Tang dynasty Chinese artist Zhou Fang, eighth century

The social aspects of clothing have revolved around traditions regarding certain items of clothing intrinsically suited different gender roles. In different periods, both women's and men's fashions have highlighted one area or another of the body for attention. In particular, the wearing of skirts and trousers has given rise to common phrases expressing implied restrictions in use and disapproval of offending behavior. For example, ancient Greeks often considered the wearing of trousers by Persian men as a sign of an effeminate attitude. Women's clothing in Victorian fashion was used as a means of control and admiration. Reactions to the elaborate confections of French fashion led to various calls for reform on the grounds of both beauties (Artistic and Aesthetic dress) and health (dress reform; especially for undergarments and lingerie). Although trousers for women did not become fashionable until the later 20th century, women began wearing men's trousers (suitably altered) for outdoor work a hundred years earlier. In the 1960s, André Courrèges introduced long trousers for women as a fashion item, leading to the era of the pantsuit and designer jeans, and the gradual eroding of the prohibitions against girls and women wearing trousers in schools, the workplace, and fine restaurants. Corsets have long been used for fashion, and body modification, such as waistline reduction. There were, and are, many different styles and types of corsets, varying depending on the intended use, corset maker's style, and the fashions of the era.

=== Status ===
The social status of women in the Victoria Era is often seen as an illustration of the striking discrepancy between the nation's power and richness and what many consider its appalling social conditions. Victorian morality was full of contradictions. A plethora of social movements concerned with improving public morals co-existed with a class system that permitted and imposed harsh living conditions for many, such as women. In this period, an outward appearance of dignity and restraint was valued, but the usual "vices" continued, such as prostitution. In the Victorian era, the bathing machine was developed and flourished. It was a device to allow people to wade in the ocean at beaches without violating Victorian notions of modesty about having "limbs" revealed. The bathing machine was part of sea-bathing etiquette that was more rigorously enforced upon women than men.

=== Queenship studies ===
Several 21st century popular history books, and media have also studied royal women in the medieval period.

=== Roaring Twenties ===
The Roaring Twenties is a term for society and culture in the 1920s in the Western world. It was a period of sustained economic prosperity with a distinctive cultural edge in the United States, Canada, and Western Europe, particularly in major cities.

Women's suffrage came about in many major countries in the 1920s, including United States, Canada, Great Britain. many countries expanded women's voting rights in representative and direct democracies across the world such as the US, Canada, Great Britain and most major European countries in 1917–21, as well as India. This influenced many governments and elections by increasing the number of voters available. Politicians responded by spending more attention on issues of concern to women, especially pacifism, public health, education, and the status of children. On the whole, women voted much like their menfolk, except they were more pacifistic.

The 1920s marked a revolution in fashion. The new woman danced, drank, smoked and voted. She cut her hair short, wore make-up and partied. Sometimes she smoked a cigarette. She was known for being giddy and taking risks; she was a flapper. More women took jobs making them more independent and free. With their desire for freedom and independence came as well change in fashion, welcoming a more comfortable style, where the waistline was just above the hips and loosen, and staying away from the Victorian style with a corset and tight waistline.

=== Great Depression ===
With widespread unemployment among men, poverty, and the need to help family members who are in even worse condition, The pressures were heavy on women during the Great Depression across the modern world. A primary role was as a housewife. Without a steady flow of family income, their work became much harder in dealing with food and clothing and medical care. The birthrates fell everywhere, as children were postponed until families could financially support them. The average birthrate for 14 major countries fell 12% from 19.3 births per thousand population in 1930 to 17.0 in 1935. In Canada, half of Roman Catholic women defied Church teachings and used contraception to postpone births.

Among the few women in the labor force, layoffs were less common in the white-collar jobs and they were typically found in light manufacturing work. However, there was a widespread demand to limit families to one paid job, so that wives might lose employment if their husband was employed. Across Britain, there was a tendency for married women to join the labor force, competing for part-time jobs especially.

In rural and small-town areas, women expanded their operation of vegetable gardens to include as much food production as possible. In the United States, agricultural organizations sponsored programs to teach housewives how to optimize their gardens and to raise poultry for meat and eggs. In American cities, African American women quiltmakers enlarged their activities, promote collaboration, and trained neophytes. Quilts were created for practical use from various inexpensive materials and increased social interaction for women and promoted camaraderie and personal fulfillment.

Oral history provides evidence for how housewives in a modern industrial city handled shortages of money and resources. Often they updated strategies their mothers used when they were growing up in poor families. Cheap foods were used, such as soups, beans and noodles. They purchased the cheapest cuts of meat—sometimes horse meat—and recycled the Sunday roast into sandwiches and soups. They sewed and patched clothing, traded with their neighbors for outgrown items, and made do with colder homes. New furniture and appliances were postponed until better days. Many women also worked outside the home, or took boarders, did laundry for trade or cash, and did sewing for neighbors in exchange for something they could offer. Extended families used mutual aid—extra food, spare rooms, repair-work, cash loans—to help cousins and in-laws.

In Japan, official government policy was deflationary and the opposite of Keynesian spending. Consequently, the government launched a nationwide campaign to induce households to reduce their consumption, focusing attention on spending by housewives.

In Germany, the government tried to reshape private household consumption under the Four-Year Plan of 1936 to achieve German economic self-sufficiency. The Nazi women's organizations, other propaganda agencies and the authorities all attempted to shape such consumption as economic self-sufficiency was needed to prepare for and to sustain the coming war. Using traditional values of thrift and healthy living, the organizations, propaganda agencies and authorities employed slogans that called up traditional values of thrift and healthy living. However, these efforts were only partly successful in changing the behavior of housewives.

=== Religion ===
The Hindu, Jewish, Sikh, Islamic and Christian views about women have varied throughout the last two millennia, evolving along with or counter to the societies in which people have lived. For much of history, the role of women in the life of the church, both local and universal, has been downplayed, overlooked, or simply denied.

- Timeline of women in religion
- Timeline of women's ordination worldwide
- Timeline of women in religion in America
- Timeline of women rabbis in America
- Timeline of women rabbis worldwide

=== Warfare ===
Warfare always engaged women as victims and objects of protection.

The First World War has received the most coverage, with the newest trend being coverage of a wide range of gender issues.

==== Home front ====
During the twentieth century of total warfare the female half of the population played increasingly large roles as housewives, consumers, mothers, munitions workers, replacements for men in service, nurses, lovers, sex objects and emotional supporters. One result in many countries was women getting the right to vote, including the United States, Canada, Germany, and Russia, among others.

==== Timelines ====
- Timeline of women in ancient warfare worldwide
- Timeline of women in warfare in the Postclassical Era worldwide
- Timeline of women in warfare in the early modern era worldwide
- Timeline of women in warfare from 1750 until 1799 in America
- Timeline of women in warfare from 1750 until 1799 worldwide
- Timeline of women in warfare in the 19th century in America
- Timeline of women in warfare in the 19th century worldwide
- Timeline of women in warfare from 1900 until 1939 in America
- Timeline of women in warfare from 1900 until 1939 worldwide
- Timeline of women in warfare from 1940 until 1944 worldwide
- Timeline of women in warfare from 1945 until 1999 in America
- Timeline of women in warfare from 1945 until 1999 worldwide
- Timeline of women in warfare from 2000 until the present in America
- Timeline of women in warfare from 2000 until the present worldwide

== See also ==
- Feminist Library
- GENESIS
- Herstory
- History of indigenous women in the early Paraguay
- History of violence against women
- List of American women's firsts
- The Subjection of Women
- Women in the Middle Ages
- Women's History Month
- Women's Library
- Women in prehistory
- Education of girls in France
