= Mbyá Guaraní =

Mbyá Guaraní may be:

- Mbyá Guaraní people
- Mbyá Guaraní language
