= History of violence against women =

Violence against women are acts of violence committed against women.

== Timeline of protection regimes ==
- The 1979 Convention on the Elimination of All Forms of Discrimination against Women (CEDAW), which recognises violence as a part of discrimination against women in recommendations 12 and 19.
- The 1993 World Conference on Human Rights, which recognised violence against women as a human rights violation, and which contributed to the following UN declaration.
- The 1993 UN Declaration on the Elimination of Violence against Women was the first international instrument explicitly defining and addressing violence against women. This document specifically refers to the historically forever-present nature of gender inequalities in understanding violence against women. (Include current 2nd paragraph here). This Declaration, as well as the World Conference of the same year, is often viewed as a "turning point" at which the consideration of violence against women by the international community began to be taken much more seriously, and after which more countries mobilized around this problem. The first major document that highlights the recognition of violence against women as a human rights violation: the United Nations Declaration on the Elimination of Violence Against Women in Vienna, 1993. It was a result of collective effort of global feminist movement to transform the Vienna conference from a general and mainstream human rights conference into the conference on women's rights. As before the other human rights organisations such as Amnesty International and Human Rights Watch did not focus on the issue of VAW and did not consider rape and domestic violence as violations of human rights despite the fact that they also have agenda on women's rights.
- The 1994 International Conference on Population and Development, linking violence against women to reproductive health and rights, and also providing recommendations to governments on how to prevent and respond to violence against women and girls.
- The 1995 Fourth World Conference on Women in Beijing During the 4th Women Conference, VAW was emphasized and named as a critical concern. Also, the spillover effect was that this push highlighted the need for the development of "new international norms" that have often been used by activists and governments the proposition of legislation that provide other action to redress the acts of violence. Subsequently, the push from the global feminist movement also push for the fully incorporation of the VAW issues into the Committee on the Elimination of Discrimination Against Women (CEDAW) whereas the "original text of CEDAW in 1979 did not explicitly mention violence against women".
- In 1996, the World Health Assembly (WHA) declared violence a major public health issue, and included in the subtypes recognised were intimate partner violence and sexual violence, two kinds of violence often perpetrated as violence against women. This was followed by a World Health Organization (WHO) report in 2002 (see below). The UN also created the Trust Fund to Support Actions to Eliminate Violence Against Women.
- In 1999, the UN adopted the Optional Protocol to the Convention on the Elimination of All Forms of Discrimination against Women and designated 25 November as the International Day for the Elimination of Violence against Women.
- In 2002, as a follow-up of the WHA declaration in 1996 of violence as a major public health issue, the WHO published the first World Report on Violence and Health, which addressed many types of violence and their effect on public health, including forms of violence affecting women particularly strongly. The report specifically noted the sharp rise in civil society organisations and activities directed at responding to gender-based violence against women from the 1970s to the 1990s.
- In 2004, the WHO published its "Multi-country study on Women's Health and Domestic Violence against Women", a study of women's health and domestic violence by surveying over 24,000 women in 10 countries from all regions of the world, which assessed the prevalence and extent of violence against women, particularly violence by intimate partners, and linked this with health outcomes to women as well as documenting strategies and services that women use to cope with intimate-partner violence.
- The 2006 UN Secretary General's "In-depth study on all forms of violence against women", the first comprehensive international document on the issue.
- The 2011 Council of Europe Convention on preventing and combating violence against women and domestic violence, which is the second regional legally-binding instrument on violence against women and girls.
- In 2013, the United Nations Commission on the Status of Women (CSW) adopted, by consensus, Agreed Conclusions on the elimination and prevention of all forms of violence against women and girls (formerly, there were no agreed-upon conclusions).
- Also in 2013, the UN General Assembly passed its first resolution calling for the protection of defenders of women's human rights. The resolution urges states to put in place gender-specific laws and policies for the protection of women's human rights defenders and to ensure that defenders themselves are involved in the design and implementation of these measures, and calls on states to protect women's human rights defenders from reprisals for cooperating with the UN and to ensure their unhindered access to and communication with international human rights bodies and mechanisms.

=== Timeline of protection regimes in the Americas ===
- 1967: One of the country's first domestic violence shelters opened in Maine.
- 1972: The country's first rape help hotline opened in Washington, D.C.
- 1978: Two national coalitions, the National Coalition Against Sexual Assault and the National Coalition Against Domestic Violence, were formed, to raise awareness of these two forms of violence against women.
- 1984: The U.S. Attorney General created the Department of Justice Task Force on Family Violence, to address ways in which the criminal justice system and community response to domestic violence should be improved.
- 1994: Passage of the Violence Against Women Act or VAWA, legislation included in the Violent Crime Control and Law Enforcement Act of 1994, sponsored by then-Senator Joseph Biden, which required a strengthened community response to crimes of domestic violence and sexual assault, strengthened federal penalties for repeat sex offenders and strengthened legislative protection of victims, among many other provisions.
- 2000: President Clinton signed into law the VAWA of 2000, further strengthening federal laws, and emphasizing assistance of immigrant victims, elderly victims, victims with disabilities, and victims of dating violence.
- 2006: President Bush signed into law the VAWA of 2006, with an emphasis on programs to address violence against youth victims, and establishing programs for Engaging Men and Youth, and Culturally and Linguistically Specific Services.
- 2007: The National Teen Dating Abuse Hotline opened.
- 2009: President Obama declared April as Sexual Assault Awareness Month.
- 2013: President Obama signed into law the VAWA of 2015, which granted Native American tribes the ability to prosecute non-Native offenders, and regulated reports of sexual assault on college campuses.
