= Governorate of the Río de la Plata =

Governorate of the Spanish Empire

The adelantado grants of Charles V prior to the establishment of the Viceroyalty of Peru.

The Governorate of the Río de la Plata (Spanish: Gobernación del Río de la Plata, pronounced [ɡoβeɾnaˈsjon del ˈri.o ðe la ˈplata]) was one of the governorates of the Spanish Empire. It was created in 1549 by Spain in the area around the Río de la Plata.

It was at first simply a renaming of the New Andalusia Governorate and included all of the land between 470 and 670 leagues south of the mouth of the Río Santiago along the Pacific coast. After 1617, Paraguay was separated under a separate administration (Asunción had been the capital of the governorate since Juan de Ayolas.)

After the founding of the Viceroyalty of Peru in 1542, the governorate was since its birth under its authority until the formation of the independent Viceroyalty of the Río de la Plata in 1776. Similarly, it was under the jurisdiction of the Royal Audience of Charcas until the formation of the independent Royal Audience of Buenos Aires from 1661 to 1671 and after 1783.

== Governors of New Andalusia ==
- 1534–1537 : Adelantado Governor, Captain General, and Chief justice Pedro de Mendoza. First founding of Buenos Aires; Fort Corpus Christi founded by Juan de Ayolas. Retires and dies mad en route home.
- 1537–1539 : Governor Juan de Ayolas. Resided in Paraguay, where Asunción was founded by Juan de Salazar de Espinoza. Killed by natives.
- 1537–1541 : Lt. Governor Francisco Ruíz Galán. Resided at Buenos Aires, prior to its abandonment.
- 1539–1541 : Governor Domingo Martínez de Irala. Elected by the colonists, disputed the authority of Galán.
- 1541–1544 : Adelantado Governor Alvar Núñez Cabeza de Vaca. Victorious campaign against Guarani in 1542. Arrested and returned to Spain for trial.

== Governors of the Río de la Plata ==
- 1544–1556 : Governor Domingo Martínez de Irala. Encouraged his men to marry and keep concubines from local women. Two adelantados are unable to arrive from Spain and de Irala confirmed in his post by the king 1552. Died peacefully.
- 1556–1558 : Governor Gonzalo de Mendoza. Ciudad Real de Guayrá founded by Ruy Díaz de Malgarejo in 1557. Died peacefully.
- 1558–1569 : Governor Francisco Ortiz de Vergara. Elected by the colonists. Foundations fail at San Francisco, Sancti Spiritus, and Santa Cruz de la Sierra. Arrested and returned to Spain for trial.
- 1569–1572 : Lt. Governor Felipe de Cáceres. Appointed by Royal Audience. Arrested and returned to Spain for trial.
- 1572-1574 : Lt. Governor Martín Suárez de Toledo. Acting
- 1574–1576 : Adelantado Governor Juan Ortiz de Zárate. Sailed to Spain to confirm his election. Foundation of Tucuman.
- 1576–1578 : Lt. Governor Diego Ortiz de Zárate. Juan Ortiz left the administration to his daughter Juana, but others de facto governed.
- 1578–1583 : Lt. Governor Juan de Garay. Buenos Aires refounded 1580.
- 1583–1587 : Lt. Governor Alonso de Vera y Aragón. And de facto governor at Asunción until 1592.
- 1587–1592 : Adelantado Governor Juan Torres de Vera y Aragón. Judge of the Royal Audience, married to Juana Ortiz de Zárate. Last appointed adelantado.

== Governors of the Río de la Plata and Paraguay ==
- 1592–1594 : Governor Hernando Arias de Saavedra ("Hernandarias").
- 1594–1595 : Governor Fernando de Zárate.
- 1596–1597 : Governor Juan Ramírez de Velasco.
- 1597–1599 : Governor Hernando Arias de Saavedra. Second time.
- 1599–1600 : Governor Diego Rodríguez de Valdés y de la Banda.
- 1600–1602 : Governor Francés de Beaumont. Appointment formalized 1601.
- 1602–1609 : Governor Hernando Arias de Saavedra. Third time. First Jesuit Reduction established. Slave trade restricted.
- 1609–1613 : Governor Diego Martín de Negrón.
- 1613–1615 : Governor Mateo Leal de Ayala.
- 1615–1617 : Governor Hernando Arias de Saavedra. Fourth time.

Guayrá was separated into a separate Governorate of Paraguay in 1617.

== Governors of Río de la Plata ==
The audiencias of the Viceroyalty of Peru c.1650. The Audience of Charcas is section 5.

- 1617–1618 : Governor Hernando Arias de Saavedra.
- 1618–1623 : Governor Diego de Góngora. Found guilty post mortem of corruption, allowing trade in slaves and contraband to flourish.
- 1623–1624 : Governor Alonso Pérez de Salazar.
- 1624–1631 : Governor Francisco de Céspedes. Continued efforts to pacify the Charrua.
- 1631–1637 : Governor Pedro Esteban Dávila. Concepción del Bermejo destroyed by natives.
- 1637–1640 : Governor Mendo de la Cueva y Benavidez. Defense of Buenos Aires improved. Expedition against the Calchaquís. Fort Santa Teresa erected.
- 1640–1641 : Governor Ventura Mojica (or Mujica).
- 1640–1641 : Governor Pedro de Roxas y Acevedo.
- 1641–1641 : Governor Andrés de Sandoval.
- 1641–1645 : Governor Jerónimo Luis de Cabrera y Garay. Expulsion of Portuguese attempted in governorate.
- 1645–1653 : Governor Jacinto Lariz. Arrested.
- 1653–1660 : Governor Pedro Baigorrí Ruiz. Three French ships successfully repelled from Buenos Aires. Calchaquís repelled from Santa Fe.
- 1660–1663 : Governor Alonso Mercado y Villacorta. Request to be able to send two trade ships annually denied. Dutch ships permitted to dock in Buenos Aires.
- 1663–1674 : Governor José Martínez de Salazar. Continued requests for free commerce. The Royal Audience of Buenos Aires briefly independent of the court at Charcas.
- 1674–1678 : Governor Andrés de Robles.
- 1678–1682 : Governor José de Garro. Portuguese expelled from Colonia de Sacramento in 1680.
- 1682–1691 : Governor José Antonio de Herrera y Sotomayor. Tucuman relocated.
- 1691–1698 : Governor Agustín de Robles.
- 1698–1704 : Governor Manuel de Prado y Maldonado. Visit from Danish squadron in Buenos Aires.
- 1704–1708 : Governor Alonso Juan de Valdés e Inclán. Colonia de Sacramento retaken.
- 1708–1712 : Governor Manuel de Velasco y Tejada. Purchased office for 3000 pesos. Arrested.
- 1712–1712 : Governor Juan José de Muliloa.
- 1712–1714 : Governor Alonso de Arce y Soria. Buys the position for 18,000 pesos. Dies five months later.
- 1714–1715 : Governor José Bermúdez de Castro.
- 1715–1717 : Governor Baltasar García Ros. Colonia del Sacramento returned to the Portuguese. Campaigns against the Charrua, Yaro, and Bohanes.
- 1717–1734 : Governor Bruno Mauricio de Zabala. Repelled Portuguese attack against Montevideo.
- 1734–1742 : Governor Miguel de Salcedo y Sierraalta. Expulsion of foreigners from Buenos Aires ordered. Failed attempt to retake Colonia del Sacramento.
- 1742–1745 : Governor Domingo Ortíz de Rozas. Refortified Montevideo.
- 1745–1756 : Governor José de Andonaegui. First mail delivery opened with Chile and Potosí.
- 1756–1766 : Governor Pedro Antonio de Cevallos (or Ceballos). Colonia del Sacramento retaken.
- 1766–1770 : Governor Francisco de Paula Bucarelli y Ursúa. English expelled from the Falkland Islands. Mail inaugurated between A Coruña and the Río de la Plata.
- 1770–1776 : Governor Juan José de Vértiz y Salcedo. After which, the governorate is replaced by the Viceroyalty and Intendancy of Buenos Aires in the Bourbon reforms.

== See also ==
- History of Argentina
- History of Paraguay
- History of Uruguay
