= Lambaré (chieftain) =

16th-century purported Guaraní chieftain

- Born: 16th century Paraguay River basin
- Died: 1541; Asunción, Governorate of New Andalusia, Spanish Empire
- Cause of death: Execution by hanging
- Other names: Lampere
- Citizenship: Guaraní
- Known for: His leading role in the Guaraní resistance against early Spanish colonization.

Lambaré (died 1541), also transliterated as Lampere, was a purported cacique (i.e. chieftain) of the Guaraní people who fought against and subsequently reconciled with Spanish conquistadors in what is now Paraguay in the 16th century.

== Accounts ==
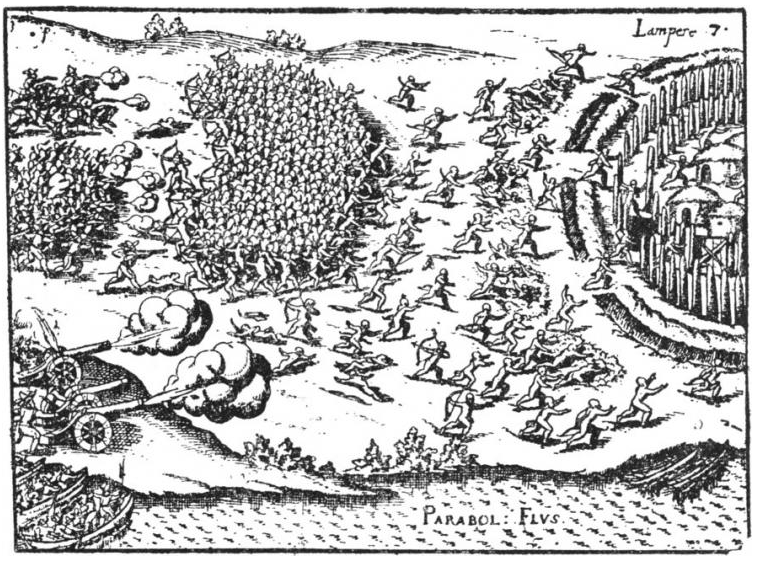
Engraving from 1599 illustrating explorer Ulrich Schmidl's chronicles of 1534–1554 in the Río de la Plata basin, depicting a batlle in Lambaré between the Guaraní and the Spanish conquistadors.

According to some historias, the name Lambaré comes from Lampere, coined by explorer Ulrich Schmidl in his 1567 book Derrotero y viaje a España y las Indias, the chronicles of his time in the Río de la Plata basin between 1534 and 1554.

It is said that Lambaré and his soldiers attacked Spanish conquistador Juan de Ayolas' expedition when it arrived in 1536 at the place near where a year later the Spaniards would found the fortification of the Nuestra Señora de la Asunción (present-day city of Asunción). According to Paraguayan historian Roberto A. Romero, this constitutes the first act of Guaraní resistance against Spanish colonization.

Romero cites a document from the Archivo General de Simancas that details the legal process through which Lambaré, Paraguá and Guarambaré were sentenced to death by hanging, signed by Irala's scribe Leandro García H. The text stipulates the date of their execution in the Holy Week of 1541. It also includes the alleged statements of Lambaré, Paraguá and Guarambaré, reading:

They said themselves: Mba'élcha rupi oúta pytaguakuéra omboaparyry tetã guaraníme oikuaa'ỹre iñe'ẽ ha imba'embyasy. Kóva ko tetã kasíke Lambaré mba'e, ndohejamo'ãl heta tetã ambue ou ombopytupa isãso. Upévare tekotevẽ oikuaa mayma pytaguakuéra, mba'éicha karioguaraní ha Paraguay ra'y omano ha oporojuka Tupã rérape, ani hag̃ua avave oñotỹ ipy ha hi'ánga y Paraguay ikére ha Paragua yvypy. This is: How are foreigners going to come to enslave the Guaraní land, without knowing its language and its needs? This homeland that belongs to the Indian Paragua, is not going to allow its freedom to be suffocated and that they have to die for the good of the community, etc., etc. They said themselves: Jaikova'ekue heta árape sãso poyvy výpe, ha ko'ág̃a peẽ pejúta pytaguakuéra pemondoho ñande sãso ome'ẽva'ekue heta ára paha rire mburuvicha Paraguay ta'ýrare, ha upéva ñaipysyrõne ñamano peve, ani péicha péichante ou pytaguakuéra oikytĩ kyse ipukúvape ñane sãso. Heta árapema, peẽ pytaguakuéra peñomi guaraní ha kario ra'ykuéra ruvy reheve. This is: We have lived under the mantle of our freedom for a long time for you to now come to put an end to it and that many years have passed since the cacique Paraguay and his sons gave them freedom from other races and, that we also trade with their blood, which is a manifest intrigue in the person of Your Catholic Majesty, the Lord Governor of these provinces.

== Historicity ==
Paraguayan historian Gustavo Laterza Rivarola rejected the historicity of Lambaré—both the individual and the settlement—in his 2009 book Historia de Lambaré, claiming that the only source of his existence are Schmidl's chronicles, which have been questioned for their veracity. In the book's prologue, writer Alcibiades González Delvalle noted:

It is known that there are pages of our history that are more like myths and legends. These, repeated even by historians with a reputation as such, become indisputable truths. Except, of course, when someone appears willing to do the basic thing: go to the documents to deactivate the lie. For too long the version spread that a cacique, Lambaré, was a brave warrior who faced the conquistadors in defense of his domains, also known by his name. But lo and behold, such a warrior never existed. And neither did such a site, in colonial times. Everything originated in a single wrong version, which was then given imaginative interpretations which, in turn, originated equally fantastic ones.

== Legacy ==
A street and an avenue in Asunción are named Cacique Lambaré, two of the few thoroughfares in the city named after an indigenous individual rather than an entire community, along with other figures such as the India Juliana and the cacique Arecayá.
