= Martín Suárez de Toledo =

Spanish explorer and governor of Río de la Plata

Governor of the Río de la Plata and Paraguay
- In office 1572–1574
- Monarch: Philip II
- Preceded by: Felipe de Cáceres
- Succeeded by: Juan Ortiz de Zárate

Personal details
- Born: Martín Suárez de Toledo y Saavedra; 1520 Seville, Spain
- Died: 1584 (aged 63–64) Asunción, Paraguay
- Occupation: Conquistador
- Profession: Army's officer

Military service
- Allegiance: Spain
- Branch/service: Spanish Army
- Rank: Captain

Martín Suárez de Toledo (1520–1584) was a Spanish nobleman and conquistador. He served as interim Governor of the Río de la Plata and Paraguay. Suárez de Toledo is primarily remembered for his involvement in the conquest and colonization of the Río de la Plata region.

== Biography ==
Born in Seville, his parents were Hernando Arias de Saavedra and Beatriz Suarez de Figueroa, belonging to the Spanish nobility. Martín Suárez de Toledo came to Paraguay in the expedition of Alvar Nunez Cabeza de Vaca in 1542.

He was married to María de Sanabria, daughter of Juan de Sanabria and Mencía Calderón Ocampo.

Martín Suárez de Toledo was Governor of Paraguay and Río de la Plata between July 31, 1569, and November 29, 1574, and was preceded by Felipe de Cáceres. He also served as Lieutenant governor of Asunción in 1569–1572 and 1574–1575.

Martín Suárez de Toledo and María de Sanabria, were the parents of the Governor Hernando Arias de Saavedra.

== See also ==
- Juan Abalos de Mendoza
- Juan de Ayolas
- Gonzalo Casco
- Nicolás Colman
- Ulrich Schmidl
