= India Juliana =

16th-century Guaraní rebel from early-colonial Paraguay

Juliana
- Modern depiction of the India Juliana, used in the logo of a Paraguayan indigenous women's organization.
- Born: 16th century Paraguay River basin
- Died: c. 1542; Asunción, present-day Paraguay, colonial Spanish America
- Cause of death: Execution by dismemberment
- Citizenship: Guaraní
- Known for: Killing her Spaniard master or husband and urging other indigenous women to do the same.

Juliana (pronounced [xu 'lja na]), better known as the India Juliana (Spanish for "Indian Juliana" or "Juliana the Indian"), is the Christian name of a Guaraní woman who lived in the newly founded Asunción, in early-colonial Paraguay, known for killing a Spanish colonist between 1539 and 1542. She was one of the many indigenous women who were handed over to or stolen by the Spanish, raped, forced to work for them and bear children. Since the area was not rich in minerals as they had anticipated, the colonists generated wealth through the enslavement and forced labor of indigenous people, especially women.

The story of the India Juliana comes from the 1545 accounts of adelantado (Note: An adelantado was a representative of the Crown of Castile who headed military expeditions and held judicial and administrative powers over specific territories.) Álvar Núñez Cabeza de Vaca—who briefly ruled the territory between 1542 and 1544—as well as those of his scribe Pero Hernández. According to these sources, the India Juliana poisoned a Spanish settler named Ñuño de Cabrera—either her husband or her master—with herbs and was released despite having confessed to the crime. Upon his arrival to Asunción, Cabeza de Vaca reportedly found out about her case, and that she even boasted of her actions to her peers. In response, he ordered her execution by dismemberment, as a punishment for the crime and a warning to other indigenous women not to do the same.

The India Juliana is regarded as one of the most prominent figures in the women's history of Paraguay, and her inciting other women to also kill their masters has been considered one of the earliest recorded indigenous uprisings of the era. Numerous versions of her story have emerged with various ideological connotations. Although the core of her story is usually the same, the accounts differ in details such as the date of the events, the way in which she killed Cabrera and the method with which she was executed. Although some have considered the India Juliana a collaborator of the Spanish and a builder of the Paraguayan nation, others claim her as a rebel and a symbol of indigenous resistance to colonization. Several modern interpretations describe her as an early feminist, with her figure being claimed by activists and academics. The story of the India Juliana has been the subject of numerous historical fiction works. A street in Asunción bears her name since 1992, one of the few named after an indigenous individual instead of a community as a whole.

== Historical context ==
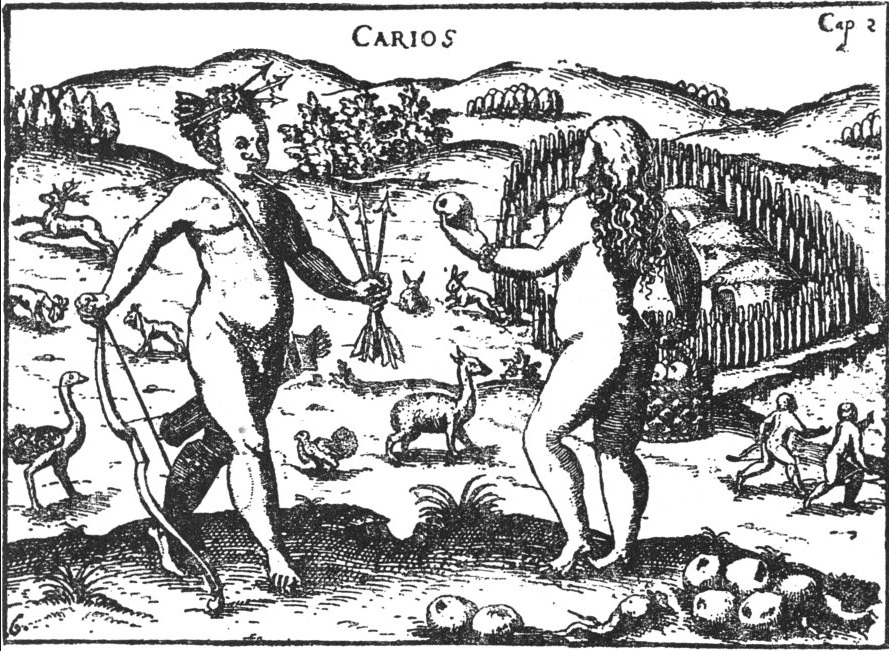
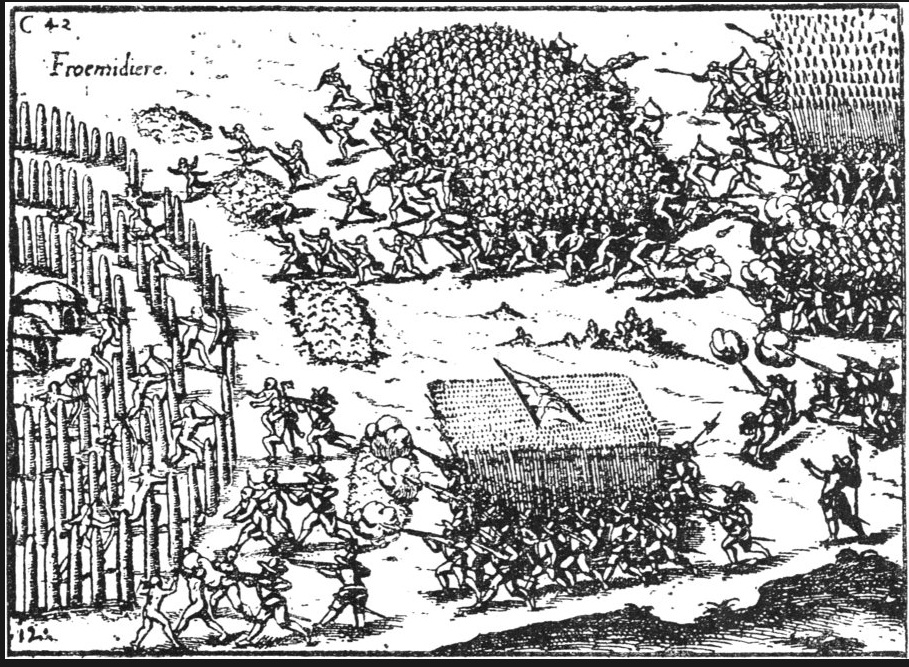
Two engravings from 1599 illustrating explorer Ulrich Schmidl's chronicles of 1534–1554 in the Río de la Plata basin, depicting the indigenous Cario people (Note: Cario was the name given to a branch (or guara) of the Guaraní people that lived between the Manduvirá, Tebicuary and Paraguay rivers, the first indigenous people of present-day Paraguay to come into contact with Spanish colonists. Other guaras included the Tobatí, Guarambaré, Itati-Guaraní, Mba'everá and Paraná-Guaraní peoples.) (top) and a battle between them and Spanish colonists (bottom).

Juliana is one of the few Cario women to be referred to in colonial sources with a (Christian) name. The first Spanish expeditions to establish settlements in Paraguay were motivated by the mistaken belief that it was a region of mineral wealth, particularly gold. In 1537, the military fort Nuestra Señora de la Asunción was founded by Juan de Salazar y Espinoza on the coast of the Paraguay River. After their encounter with the local Guaraní people, the Spanish established pacts with the caciques (Note: In Hispanic America, the term cacique (feminine form: cacica) is an exonym used to designate indigenous tribal chiefs.) sealed with the delivery of women. Initially, giving women to the colonists was done under the framework of cuñadazgo, a concept through which Guaraní leaders created pacts of peace and mutual benefit, as it transformed the recipient in brother-in-law or son-in-law. Since the Spanish treatment of the Guaraní was not one of reciprocity but domination, these initial exchanges were soon followed by indigenous uprisings, with at least three violent situations recorded in 1538–1539, 1542–1543, and 1545–1546. The context in which the India Juliana's case took place has historically been called "Muhammad's paradise" (Spanish: "Paraíso de Mahoma"), referring to the "promiscuous" regime of sexual slavery to which indigenous women were subjected during the 1540s. In an account from 1541, colonist Domingo Martínez de Irala detailed that 300 indigenous women lived in Asunción, who were handed over by the Cario people to serve the Spanish.

In 1541, the initial Spanish settlement of Buenos Aires—built on the coast of the Río de la Plata—was abandoned in the face of attacks from indigenous peoples, and its inhabitants moved to Asunción, which was officially founded as a city by Irala on what was once the fort. From then on, the settlement received a much larger number of Spaniards and became the center of the Spanish colonization of the southern half of South America. After discovering that the region actually lacked gold, the colonists realized they could generate and accumulate wealth through the forced labor and slavery of indigenous people, especially the sexual exploitation of women of childbearing age. Mass indigenous deportations known as rancheadas took place, in which women were extracted from their communities and forced to work for the colonists. The violent rancheadas began to replace the initial period of cuñadazgo around 1543, and became generalized two years later. The native women, enslaved as servants and mothers of the mestizos, quickly became a piece of merchandise. Asunción then became a center for the deportation of indigenous slaves, supplying a human trafficking market between the city and the Portuguese port of São Vicente on the coast of Brazil.

Based in Asunción, Irala had been ruling the Governorate of New Andalusia—which was in charge of the colonization of the Río de la Plata Basin—since 1538, being elected by his peers after the appointed governor Juan de Ayolas went missing in an expedition. When the news of Ayolas' probable death reached the Spanish Court, explorer Álvar Núñez Cabeza de Vaca was named second adelantado of the Governorate, arriving to Asunción on March 11, 1542, and taking power from Irala. Upon arrival, Cabeza de Vaca "tried to establish order and discipline among the soldiers and settlers of Asunción, declaring himself protector of the [indigenous peoples]." After a failed expedition looking for a route to Peru in 1542, the discontent among the Spanish settlers led to a conspiracy led by Irala against him in 1544, re-electing the latter as governor. Cabeza de Vaca was arrested with the excuse of being too "permissive with the natives", and sent to Spain as a prisoner. The practice of rancheadas became widespread with Irala's second government, with researcher Guillaume Candela describing them as: "without any doubt the most effective acculturation phenomenon of the conquest. Entire villages were emptied of their procreative forces, thus marking an evident trauma in the lives of the affected [indigenous people]."

== Original account ==
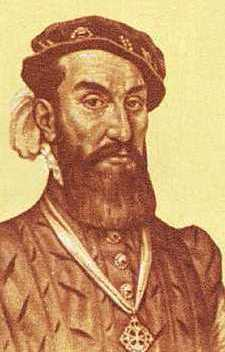
Portrait of adelantado Álvar Núñez Cabeza de Vaca, who introduced the India Juliana in a 1545 account presented to the Council of the Indies.

Although the historical references about the India Juliana are brief, they establish a strong counterpoint with the more usual representations of Guaraní women in the early-colonial sources of the Río de la Plata region. The main source comes from an account that Cabeza de Vaca presented to the Council of the Indies in December 1545 as judicial evidence, known as Comentarios. The text was actually written by Cabeza de Vaca's scribe Pero Hernández, at the former's request. Returning to Spain as a prisoner in 1545, Cabeza de Vaca entered into a legal dispute with the Council of the Indies that lasted almost eight years, in which he received a harsh sentence. In 1555, after resolving his legal problems and cleaning up his image, and upon receiving the pertinent royal authorization, Cabeza de Vaca published La relación y comentarios del gobernador Álvar Núñez cabeza de vaca de lo acaecido en las dos jornadas que hizo a las Indias, which compiled the Comentarios along with a previous account from 1542 known as Naufragios. However, he chose to omit the India Juliana passage from the book, along with other parts of the account that evidenced his use of violence, so as to "avoid any statement that allows a double reading". Section "XLII" of the original 1545 Comentarios read:

At the time I arrived in [Asunción], I was informed that an Indian named Juliana, a native of said land, had poisoned a Christian named Ñuño de Cabrera, and that Domingo de Irala had held her prisoner and had prosecuted her, and having verified the crime by confession of said Juliana, saying that out of jealousy she had of said Nuño de Cabrera, she had given him poison by which he died, and at the time [the men of Asunción] learned that I was coming they released her and said Juliana left, and to all the other Indian women who served the Christians she told that only she was the brave one who had killed her husband; which after coming to my notice I ordered to search for and arrest the said Juliana, and imprisoned, she again proceeded to confess the crime, and the said Domingo de Irala came to beg me to release her at the request of a Sancho de Salinas, his friend, first cousin of said Nuño de Cabrera, who was fond of said Juliana; I decried and reprimanded him, as well as the said Domingo de Irala as well as the said Sancho de Salinas, and by virtue of the process my mayor did justice to it, because in addition to deserving it, he agreed to remove the audacity that [other women] did not dare to such cases.

An earlier reference to Juliana's case—albeit without mentioning her name—is an account authored by Hernández, dated to January 28, 1545, in which he denounced the crimes committed in the Governorate since the disappearance of governor Ayolas. In two sections of the text, Hernández referred to the India Juliana's case:

... a Christian Indian woman killed Nuño Cabrera, her master, Cazalla's neighbor, with herbs, and Pero Díaz, her mayor, arrested her and proceeded; the Indian confessed to the crime, and at the request of Sancho de Salinas, the deceased's cousin, the Indian was released, and she left without punishment. (...)

The Governor proceeded ex officio against the Indian woman who killed her master with herbs and ordered her to be arrested and was imprisoned and by virtue of her confession of what was contained in the first process that was accumulated with the second she was sentenced to death and was quartered.

Cabeza de Vaca's account of the India Juliana intended to expose the "chaos" that Irala's policies had caused in the colony, especially the promiscuity of the Spaniards with indigenous women, and to sanction these behaviors, demonstrating his "moral superiority and civilizing capacity". According to researcher Gabriela Schvartzman, the "argument of jealousy and the alleged love relationship that Juliana had with a cousin of her husband who was also close friends with Irala are the plot that allows this interpretation." Schvartzman also noted that the story has a "second moral" related to the disrespect of women to the sexual system imposed by the colonists. By writing that the India Juliana told the other women that she had been the only brave one to have dared to kill her master, Cabeza de Vaca implied that this made her proud and affirmed, and that she urged others to do the same. In this sense, researcher Silvia Tieffemberg felt that her revenge "crossed ethnic and gender barriers simultaneously."

== Historian views ==
Based on Cabeza de Vaca's original account, several different and contradictory versions of the India Juliana's story have emerged over time, some of them through history works and others through literary works. Depending on the ideological position, some discourses portray her as a warrior and an icon of indigenous resistance, while others describe her as an enthusiastic builder of the Paraguayan nation and a facilitator of the union with the Spanish. Although versions differ in details such as the year of the events (between 1539 and 1542), how she killed Cabrera or the way in which she was executed, the core of the story is generally the same: she killed her husband and urged other women to do the same, for which she was arrested and later executed as a warning so that the others do not follow her example. Some nationalist discourses—both on the right and on the political left—emphasize the "bellicose character" of the India Juliana who, "in the style of the 'heroes of the homeland', wields the sword or the dagger to kill the Spanish enemy and defend the dignity of the Paraguayan nation, but not of the Guaraní people". Argentine historian Enrique de Gandía cited Cabeza de Vaca's account in his 1932 book Indios y conquistadores en el Paraguay, which in turn was cited by Paraguayan historian Carlos Pastore in La lucha por la tierra en Paraguay (1972), in which he described the "conspiracy of the India Juliana".

Based on the fact that the she urged other indigenous women to also kill their masters, the India Juliana is commonly regarded as a Guaraní warrior that led an uprising of indigenous women against the Spanish rule. The rebellion of the India Juliana can thus be regarded as one of the earliest recorded indigenous uprisings against the Spanish rule. Several of these interpretations describe the India Juliana as the daughter of a cacique, as were the women who were handed over as part of the initial pacts between natives and conquerors. In his 1963 book Formación histórica de la Nación Paraguaya, Argentine professor Oscar Creydt mentions the "uprising of the female servants under the leadership of the India Juliana, who died as a heroine, executed". Paraguayan women's historian Idalia Flores de Zarza also described the uprising and execution of the India Juliana in her 1987 work La mujer paraguaya: protagonista de la historia, 1537-1870. Tomo I, although she claimed that she died by hanging.

Most modern historians generally draw on these bibliographic sources, including the Argentines Felipe Pigna and Loreley El Jaber. Historian Roberto A. Romero's version—detailed in his 1995 book La revolución comunera del Paraguay—places the episode in 1542, writing: "Guaraní women were the protagonists of the great conspiracy against the Spanish colonizers, led by the India Juliana (...). She killed her Spanish husband Ñuño Cabrera and went out to walk the streets of the city, inciting the natives to do the same with their European husbands to end all the conquerors. The conspiracy was overpowered and (...) the Guaraní heroine died by hanging". Pigna dedicated a section to the India Juliana in his 2012 women's history book Mujeres que tenían que ser, in which he claims that she cut off Cabrera's head on Maundy Thursday 1539 and her incitement caused her companions to follow her example, all of them ending up tortured and hanged.

== Later versions ==
The story of the India Juliana has been the subject of numerous historical fiction works. Uruguayan writer Eduardo Galeano mentions her case in his 1982 book Memoria del fuego. In his short story "Primeras Letras. Jueves Santo, 1539", Helio Vera portrays the India Juliana as a naive girl that falls in love with Juan de Salazar and reveals a 1539 indigenous rebellion planned for Maundy Thursday, betraying her people. This vision of the India Juliana has been described as a "Guaraní Malinche". In "¡Arde Juliana, arde!", a short story by Gloria Muñoz, Juliana's case is also set on Maundy Thursday, but in 1540; in it, she incites a rebellion of indigenous women, although the others back off and she is burned at the stake. Some versions also claim that she was beheaded.

One of the facts that was made the most invisible is that the India Juliana killed Nuño de Cabrera by poisoning, with later versions indicating that it was with a sword or dagger, by beheading, or by using his own weapons. Poisoning was traditionally associated with women in the Old World and, in the Río de la Plata region, it was used effectively in the arrows of Guaraní and Timbú (Note: The Timbú, or Timbúes, were one of the indigenous peoples that lived in the Paraná Delta region, along with the Chaná-timbú, Chaná and Carcaraes, all of which had conflict with the Guaraní.) warriors. Schvartzman noted: "She killed him with weeds, with herbs from the mountains, those that her grandmothers used for thousands of years to heal, but which, depending on the dose, are also useful for killing. (...) She didn't kill him with force, she killed him with her knowledge, which after all is the greatest power of women in all time."

Some interpretations have cast doubt on the historical existence of the India Juliana, considering her a legendary figure in the manner of Anahí, a mythical Guaraní princess. Nevertheless, these claims have been dismissed, as the contemporary writings of Cabeza de Vaca and Hernández account for her existence. Reflecting on this, Schvartzman wrote:

The discourse that affirms the real non-existence of the India Juliana, or that questions this fact based on the non-existence or ignorance of reliable historical documents or records, is presented as a pretext for the invisibility of indigenous resistance, especially of women. It reinforces the idea that the relations between Spaniards and indigenous people, during the conquest and colonization, were relations without conflict, peaceful and even loving. (...)

Juliana's story as a traitor to her people or in love with her oppressor seems to have no supporting historical sources, so it would become a fiction that carries a colonialist and patriarchal discourse. Not looking for the India Juliana, or not looking for her enough, are indicators that measure the interest in finding her, in making her visible, they finally constitute a political position both for those who act in the field of historical and social research, as well as for those who act from the women's movements and feminism.

== Legacy ==
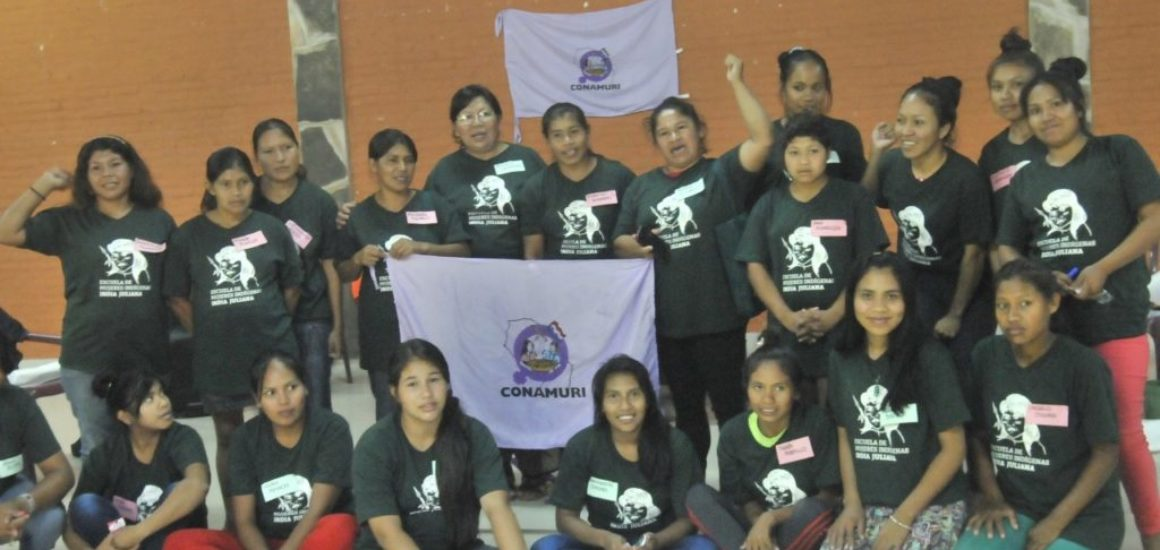
The Escuela India Juliana, a Paraguayan indigenous women's organization named after the Guaraní rebel. Her figure has been claimed by modern feminist activists and academics.

Today, the figure of the India Juliana is claimed both as a historical defender of the indigenous peoples, as well as a symbol of the emancipation of women. Several contemporary authors consider the India Juliana to be an early feminist, and several feminist groups, schools, libraries and centers for the promotion of indigenous women in Paraguay are named after her. Writer Andrés Colmán Gutiérrez of Última Hora noted that the she is "carried as a banner" in the annual demonstrations of International Women's Day and the International Day for the Elimination of Violence against Women, and described her as "perhaps the first feminist indigenous Guaraní heroine, a rebel against the macho and patriarchal culture, who denies the sugarcoated official story about the Spanish conquest in Paraguay". The figure of the India Juliana has been reclaimed as a foremother by Paraguayan academics and activists as part of a process of "recovery of feminist and women's genealogies" in South America, intended to move away from the Eurocentric vision. The same has happened in Ecuador with Dolores Cacuango and Tránsito Amaguaña; in the central Andes region with Bartolina Sisa and Micaela Bastidas; and in Argentina with María Remedios del Valle and Juana Azurduy.

The government of Asunción established the India Juliana street in 1992. It is one of the few streets in the city named after an indigenous individual rather than an entire community, along with other figures such as the caciques Arecayá and Lambaré, and the servant Indio Francisco. Although the decision to name a street after an indigenous person was celebrated, the resolution has been controversial, since it credits the India Juliana with collaborating as a guide to the colonists, regarding her as a "cultural mother" in the sense of helping the union between both cultures.

Considered one of the most prominent figures in the women's history of Paraguay, the image of India Juliana has been invoked in consumer products such as T-shirts or beers. In 2020, her story was adapted into a comic book released by Paraguayan publishing house Servilibro, as part of the collection "Mundo guaraní". Written by professor María Gloria Pereira and illustrated by Daniel Ayala Medina, the comic portrays her as a Guaraní heroine against Spanish domination, and uses the name Arapy as her original native name, which variously means "world", "universe", "space" or "firmament" in the Guaraní language. Paraguayan singer-songwriter Claudia Miranda included a song about the India Juliana in her 2020 debut studio album Las brujas, which was made with the support of the organization Centro de Documentación y Estudios (Spanish for "Center for Documentation and Studies" [CDE]).

== See also ==
- Apacuana
- Indigenous peoples in Paraguay
- Janequeo
- List of Paraguayans
- List of people who were executed
- List of rebellions
- List of slaves
- List of uprisings led by women
- List of women who led a revolt or rebellion
- Ñusta Huillac
- Slave rebellion
- Women in Paraguay

== Bibliography ==
- El Jaber, Loreley (2011). Un país malsano: la conquista del espacio en las crónicas del Río de la Plata: siglos XVI y XVII (in Spanish) (1st ed.). Rosario: Beatriz Viterbo Editora. Universidad Nacional de Rosario. ISBN 978-950-845-263-4 – via Academia.edu.
