= Nicolás Colman =

English military man

Governor of Guayrá
- In office ?–?
- Monarch: Charles V
- Preceded by: Riquelme de Guzmán
- Succeeded by: ?

Personal details
- Born: c. 1518 London, England
- Died: Unknown Asunción, Paraguay
- Occupation: Conqueror explorer
- Profession: Sailor

Military service
- Allegiance: Spain
- Branch/service: Spanish Navy
- Years of service: c. 1534-1550s
- Rank: Conquistador

Nicolás Colman (active in the 16th century) was an English military man, a conquistador in the service of the Spanish crown. He was one of the sailors who accompanied Pedro de Mendoza in the expedition of the Río de la Plata.

== Biography ==
Nicolás Colman was born in Hampton, Kingdom of England. He belonged to the small group of English sailors at the service of the Spanish Crown, who had arrived at the Río de la Plata with the army of adelantado Pedro de Mendoza. He took part in the first foundation of Buenos Aires together with his compatriots John Rute, Richard Limon and Robert Briche in 1536.

In 1537, Colman arrived in Paraguayan territory and participated in the founding of the city of Asunción. Some years later, Nicolás Colman was the leader of a revolt in the Guayrá, taking an active part in the dismissal of Francisco de Mendoza like lieutenant of governor of Asunción.

Nicolas Colmán lost his right hand in a fight. In 1567, he was regidor of Ciudad Real del Guayrá, and governor of the Guayrá.

== See also ==
- Juan Abalos de Mendoza
- Juan de Ayolas
- Gonzalo Casco
- Martín Suárez de Toledo
- Ulrich Schmidl
