= Protofeminism =

Anticipations of feminism

Protofeminism is a concept that anticipates modern feminism in eras when the feminist concept as such was still unknown. This refers particularly to times before the 20th century, although the precise usage is disputed, as 18th-century feminism and 19th-century feminism are often subsumed into "feminism". The usefulness of the term protofeminist has been questioned by some modern scholars, as has the term postfeminist.

== History ==
=== Ancient Greece and Rome ===
Plato, according to Elaine Hoffman Baruch, "[argued] for the total political and sexual equality of women, advocating that they be members of his highest class... those who rule and fight." Book five of Plato's The Republic discusses the role of women:

Are dogs divided into hes and shes, or do they both share equally in hunting and in keeping watch and in the other duties of dogs? Or do we entrust to the males the entire and exclusive care of the flocks, while we leave the females at home, under the idea that the bearing and suckling their puppies is labour enough for them?

The Republic states that women in Plato's ideal state should work alongside men, receive equal education, and share equally in all aspects of the state. The sole exception involved women working in capacities which required less physical strength.

In the first century CE, the Roman Stoic philosopher Gaius Musonius Rufus entitled one of his 21 Discourses "That Women Too Should Study Philosophy", in which he argues for equal education of women in philosophy: "If you ask me what doctrine produces such an education, I shall reply that as without philosophy no man would be properly educated, so no woman would be. Moreover, not men alone, but women too, have a natural inclination toward virtue and the capacity for acquiring it, and it is the nature of women no less than men to be pleased by good and just acts and to reject the opposite of these. If this is true, by what reasoning would it ever be appropriate for men to search out and consider how they may lead good lives, which is exactly the study of philosophy, but inappropriate for women?"

=== Islamic world ===
While in the pre-modern period there was no formal feminist movement in Islamic nations, there were a number of important figures who spoke for improving women's rights and autonomy. The medieval mystic and philosopher Ibn Arabi argued that while men were favored over women as prophets, women were just as capable of sainthood as men.

In the 12th century, the Sunni scholar Ibn Asakir wrote that women could study and earn ijazahs in order to transmit religious texts like the hadiths. This was especially the case for learned and scholarly families, who wanted to ensure the highest possible education for both their sons and daughters. However, some men did not approve of this practice, such as Muhammad ibn al-Hajj (died 1336), who was appalled by women speaking in loud voices and exposing their 'awra in the presence of men while listening to the recitation of books.

In the 12th century, the Islamic philosopher and qadi (judge) Ibn Rushd, commenting on Plato's views in The Republic on equality between the sexes, concluded that while men were stronger, it was still possible for women to perform the same duties as men. In Bidayat al-mujtahid (The Distinguished Jurist's Primer) he added that such duties could include participation in warfare and expressed discontent with the fact that women in his society were typically limited to being mothers and wives. Several women are said to have taken part in battles or helped in them during the Muslim conquests and fitnas, including Nusaybah bint Ka'ab and Aisha.

=== Christian medieval Europe ===
In Christian medieval Europe, the dominant view was that women were intellectually and morally weaker than men, having been tainted by the original sin of Eve as described in biblical tradition. This was used to justify many limits placed on women, such as not being allowed to own property, or being obliged to obey fathers or husbands at all times. This view and curbs derived from it were disputed even in medieval times. Medieval European protofeminists recognized as important to the development of feminism include Marie de France, Eleanor of Aquitaine, Bettisia Gozzadini, Nicola de la Haye, Christine de Pizan, Jadwiga of Poland, and Laura Cereta.

==== Women in the Peasants' Revolt ====
The 1381 Peasants' Revolt was a peasant rebellion in England in which English women played prominent roles. On 14 June 1381, the Lord Chancellor and Archbishop of Canterbury, Simon Sudbury, was dragged from the Tower of London and beheaded by the rebels. Leading the group that executed him was Johanna Ferrour, who ordered his execution in response to Sudbury's harsh poll taxes. She also ordered the beheading of the Lord High Treasurer, Sir Robert Hales, for his involvement with the taxes. Ferrour also participated in the looting of the Savoy Palace by the rebels, stealing a chest of gold. The Chief Justice of the King's Bench, Sir John Cavendish, was beheaded by rebels after Katherine Gamen untied the boat he planned on escaping them in.

Bates College professor Sylvia Federico argues that women often had the strongest desire to participate in revolts, including the Peasants' Revolt. They did all that men did, and were just as violent in rebelling against the government, if not more so. Ferrour was not the only female leader of the Peasants' Revolt; one Englishwoman was indicted for encouraging an attack on a prison at Maidstone in Kent, and another was responsible for robbing a multitude of mansions, which left servants too scared to return afterwards. Although there were only a small number of female leaders involved in the Peasants' Revolt, there were surprising numbers of women among the rebels, including 70 in Suffolk. The women involved had valid reasons for desiring to be so and on occasions taking a leading role. The 1380 poll tax was tougher on married women, so it is unsurprising that some women were as violent as men in their involvement. Their acts of violence signified mounting hatred for the government.

==== Hrotsvitha ====
Hrotsvitha, a German secular canoness, was born about 935 and died about 973. Her work is still seen as important, as she was the first female writer from the German lands, the first female historian, and apparently the first person since antiquity to write dramas in the Latin West.

Since her rediscovery in the 1600s by Conrad Celtis, Hrotsvitha has become a source of particular interest and study for feminists, who have begun to place her work in a feminist context, some arguing that while Hrotsvitha was not a feminist, that she is important to the history of feminism.

=== European Renaissance ===
==== Restrictions on women ====
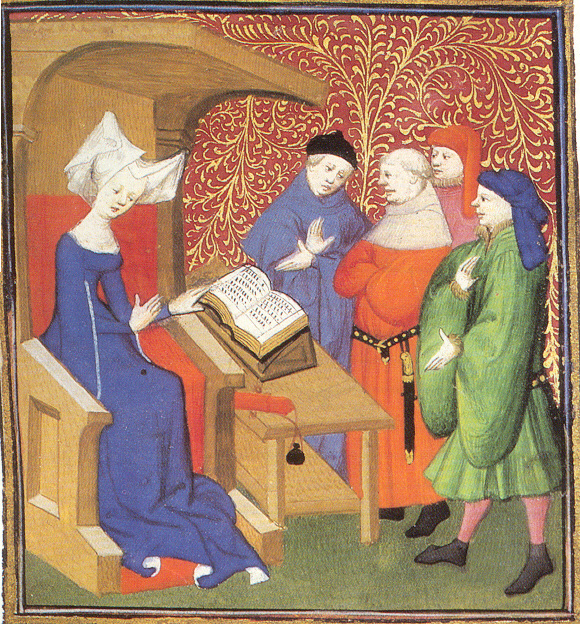
Christine de Pizan lecturing to a group of men.

At the beginning of the renaissance, women's sole role and social value was held to be reproduction.

This gender role defined a woman's main identity and purpose in life. Socrates, a well-known exemplar of the love of wisdom to Renaissance humanists, said that he tolerated his first wife Xanthippe because she bore him sons, in the same way as one tolerated the noise of geese because they produce eggs and chicks. This analogy perpetuated the claim that a woman's sole role was reproduction.

Marriage in the Renaissance defined a woman: she was whom she married. Till marriage she remained her father's property. Each had few rights beyond privileges granted by a husband or father. She was expected to be chaste, obedient, pleasant, gentle, submissive, and unless sweet-spoken, silent. In William Shakespeare's 1593 play The Taming of the Shrew, Katherina is seen as unmarriageable for her headstrong, outspoken nature, unlike her mild sister Bianca. She is seen as a wayward shrew who needs taming into submission. Once tamed, she readily goes when Petruchio summons her. Her submission is applauded; she is accepted as a proper woman, now "conformable to other household Kates."

Unsurprisingly, therefore, most women were barely educated. In a letter to Lady Baptista Maletesta of Montefeltro in 1424, the humanist Leonardo Bruni wrote, "While you live in these times when learning has so far decayed that it is regarded as positively miraculous to meet a learned man, let alone a woman." Bruni himself thought women had no need of education because they were not engaged in social forums for which such discourse was needed. In the same letter he wrote,

For why should the subtleties of... a thousand... rhetorical conundra consume the powers of a woman, who never sees the forum? The contests of the forum, like those of warfare and battle, are the sphere of men. Hers is not the task of learning to speak for and against witnesses, for and against torture, for and against reputation.... She will, in a word, leave the rough-and-tumble of the forum entirely to men."

==== "Witch literature" ====
Starting with the Malleus Maleficarum, Renaissance Europe saw the publication of numerous treatises on witches: their essence, their features, and ways to spot, prosecute and punish them.

==== Advocating women's learning ====
Yet not all agreed with this negative view of women and the restrictions on them. Simone de Beauvoir states, "The first time we see a woman take up her pen in defense of her sex" was when Christine de Pizan wrote Épître au Dieu d'Amour (Epistle to the God of Love) and The Book of the City of Ladies, at the turn of the 15th century. A notable male advocate of women's superiority was Heinrich Cornelius Agrippa in The Superior Excellence of Women Over Men.

Catherine of Aragon, commissioned a book by Juan Luis Vives arguing that women had a right to education, and encouraged and popularized education for women in England in her time as Henry VIII's wife.

Vives and fellow Renaissance humanist Agricola argued that aristocratic women at least required education. Roger Ascham educated Queen Elizabeth I, who read Latin and Greek and wrote occasional poems such as On Monsieur's Departure that are still anthologized. She was seen as having talent without a woman's weakness, industry with a man's perseverance, and the body of a weak and feeble woman, but the heart and stomach of a king. The only way she could be seen as a good ruler was through manly qualities. Being a powerful and successful woman in the Renaissance, like Queen Elizabeth I, meant in some ways being male – a perception that limited women's potential as women.

Aristocratic women had greater chances of receiving an education, but it was not impossible for lower-class women to become literate. A woman named Margherita, living during the Renaissance, learned to read and write at the age of about 30, so there would be no mediator for the letters exchanged between her and her husband. Although Margherita defied gender roles, she became literate not to become a more enlightened person, but to be a better wife by gaining the ability to communicate with her husband directly.

==== Learned women in Early Modern Europe ====
Women who received an education often reached high standards of learning and wrote in defence of women and their rights. An example is the 16th-century Venetian author Modesta di Pozzo di Forzi. The painter Sofonisba Anguissola (c. 1532–1625) was born into an enlightened family in Cremona. She and her sisters were educated to male standards, and four out of five became professional painters. Sofonisba was the most successful of all, crowning her career as court painter to the Spanish king Philip II.

The famous Renaissance salons that held intelligent debate and lectures did not allow women. This exclusion from public forums led to problems for educated women. Despite these constraints, many women were capable voices of new ideas. Isotta Nogarola fought to belie such literary misogyny through defenses of women in biographical work and the exoneration of Eve. She made a space for women's voice in this time period, being regarded as a female intellectual. Similarly, Laura Cereta re-imagined the role of women in society and argued that education is a right for all humans and going so far as to say that women were at fault for not seizing their educational rights. Cassandra Fedele was the first to join a humanist gentleman's club, declaring that womanhood was a point of pride and equality of the sexes was essential. Other women including Margaret Roper, Mary Basset and the Cooke sisters gained recognition as scholars by making important translating contributions. Moderata Fonte and Lucrezia Marinella were among some of the first women to adopt male rhetoric styles to rectify the inferior social context for women. Men at the time also recognised that certain women intellectuals had possibilities, and began writing their biographies, as Jacopo Filippo Tomasini did. The modern scholar Diana Robin outlined the history of intellectual women as a long and noble lineage.

==== The Reformation ====
The Reformation was a milestone in the development of women's rights and education. As Protestantism rested on believers' direct interaction with God, the ability to read the Bible and prayer books suddenly became necessary to all, including women and girls. Protestant communities started to set up schools where ordinary boys and girls were taught basic literacy.

Some Protestants no longer saw women as weak and evil sinners, but as worthy companions of men needing education to become capable wives.

=== Spanish colonial America ===
==== India Juliana ====
Modern depiction of the India Juliana.

Juliana, better known as the India Juliana, was the Christian name of a Guaraní woman who lived in the newly-founded Asunción, in early-colonial Paraguay, known for killing a Spanish colonist between 1538 and 1542. She was one of the many indigenous women who were handed over to the Spanish colonists and forced to move to their settlements to serve them and bear children. Juliana poisoned her Spaniard master and boasted of her actions to her peers, ending up executed as a warning to other indigenous women not to do the same.

Today, the India Juliana is regarded as an early feminist and a symbol of women's liberation, and her figure is of special interest for Paraguayan women and feminist historians. The figure of the India Juliana has been reclaimed as a foremother by Paraguayan academics and activists as part of a process of "recovery of feminist and women's genealogies" in South America, intended to move away from the Eurocentric vision. The same has happened in Ecuador with Dolores Cacuango and Tránsito Amaguaña; in the central Andes region with Bartolina Sisa and Micaela Bastidas; and in Argentina with María Remedios del Valle and Juana Azurduy. According to the researcher Silvia Tieffemberg, her revenge "crossed ethnic and gender barriers simultaneously." Several feminist groups, schools, libraries and centers for the promotion of women in Paraguay are named after her, and she is "carried as a banner" in the annual demonstrations of International Women's Day and the International Day for the Elimination of Violence against Women.

==== Sor Juana Ines de la Cruz ====
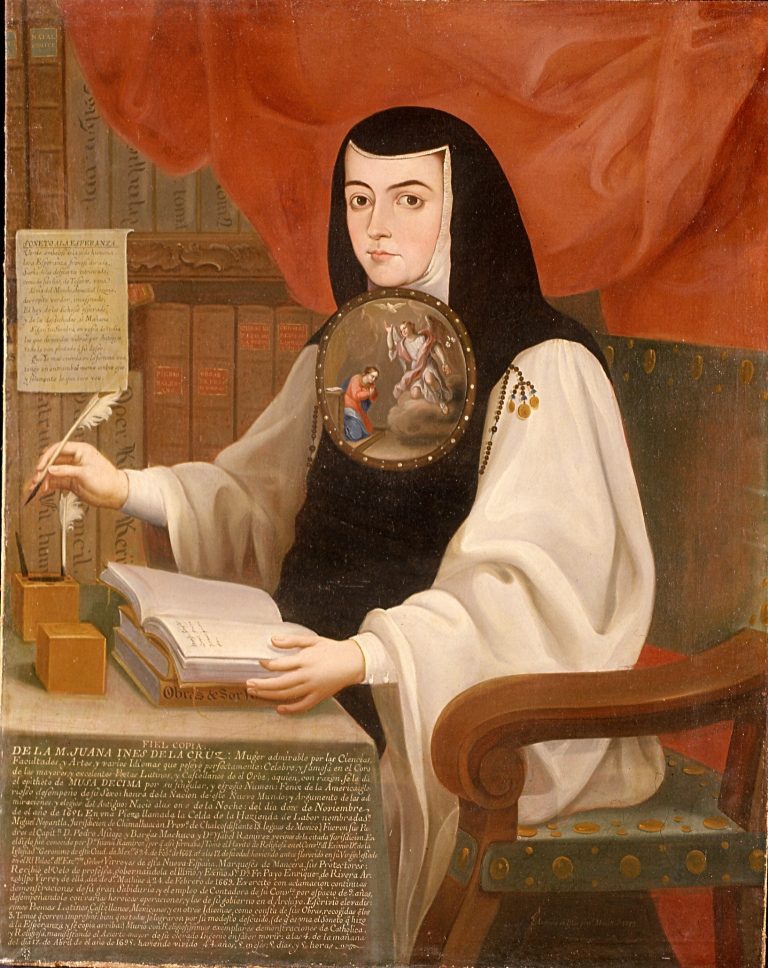
Protofeminist Sor Juana Inés de la Cruz portrayed in 1772.

Sor Juana Ines de la Cruz was a nun in colonial New Spain in the 17th century. She was an illegitimate Criolla, born to an absent Spanish father and a Criolla mother. Not only was she highly intelligent, but also self-educated, having studied in her wealthy grandfather's library. Sor Juana as a woman was barred from entering formal education. She pleaded with her mother to let her masculinize her appearance and attend university under a male guise. After the Vicereine Leonor Carreto took Sor Juana under her wing, the Viceroy, the Marquis de Mancera, provided Sor Juana with the chance to prove her intelligence. She exceeded all expectations, and legitimized by the vice-regal court, established a reputation for herself as an intellectual.

For reasons still debated, Sor Juana became a nun. While in the convent, she became a controversial figure, advocating recognition of women theologians, criticizing the patriarchal and colonial structures of the Church, and publishing her own writing, in which she set herself as an authority. Sor Juana also advocated for universal education and language rights. Not only did she contribute to the historic discourse of the Querelle des Femmes, but she has also been recognized as a protofeminist, religious feminist, and ecofeminist, and is connected with lesbian feminism.

=== 17th century ===
==== Nonconformism, protectorate and restoration ====
Marie de Gournay (1565–1645) edited the third edition of Michel de Montaigne's Essays after his death. She also wrote two feminist essays: The Equality of Men and Women (1622) and The Ladies' Grievance (1626). In 1673, François Poullain de la Barre wrote De l'Ėgalité des deux sexes (On the equality of the two sexes).

The 17th century saw many new nonconformist sects such as the Quakers give women greater freedom of expression. Noted feminist writers included Rachel Speght, Katherine Evans, Sarah Chevers, Margaret Fell (a founding Quaker), Mary Forster and Sarah Blackborow. This gave prominence to some female ministers and writers such as Mary Mollineux and Barbara Blaugdone in Quakerism's early decades.

In general, though, women who preached or expressed opinions on religion were in danger of being suspected of lunacy or witchcraft, and many, like Anne Askew, who was burned at the stake for heresy, died "for their implicit or explicit challenge to the patriarchal order".

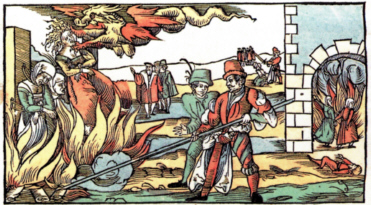
Burning of witches

In France and Britain, feminist ideas were attributes of heterodoxy, such as the Waldensians and Catharists, rather than orthodoxy. Religious egalitarianism, such as that embraced by the Levellers, carried over into gender equality and so had political implications. Leveller women mounted demonstrations and petitions for equal rights, although dismissed by the authorities of the day.

The 17th century also saw more women writers emerging, such as Anne Bradstreet, Bathsua Makin, Margaret Cavendish, Duchess of Newcastle, Lady Mary Wroth, the anonymous Eugenia, Mary Chudleigh, and Mary Astell, who depicted women's changing roles and pleaded for their education. In Sweden, women like Sophia Elisabet Brenner and Beata Rosenhane became known protofeminists. However, they encountered hostility, as shown by the experiences of Cavendish and of Wroth, whose work was unpublished until the 20th century.

Seventeenth-century France saw the rise of salons – cultural gathering places of the upper-class intelligentsia – which were run by women and in which they took part as artists. But while women gained salon membership, they stayed in the background, writing "but not for [publication]". Despite their limited role in the salons, Jean-Jacques Rousseau saw them as a "threat to the 'natural' dominance of men".

Mary Astell is often described as the first feminist writer, although this ignores the intellectual debt she owed to Anna Maria van Schurman, Bathsua Makin and others who preceded her. She was certainly among the earliest feminist writers in English, whose analyses remain relevant today, and who moved beyond earlier writers by instituting educational institutions for women. Astell and Aphra Behn together laid the groundwork for feminist theory in the 17th century. No woman would speak out as strongly again for another century. In historical accounts, Astell is often overshadowed by her younger and more colourful friend and correspondent Lady Mary Wortley Montagu.

Relaxation of social values and secularization in the English Restoration provided new chances for women in the arts, which they used to advance their cause. Yet female playwrights encountered similar hostility, including Catherine Trotter Cockburn, Mary Manley and Mary Pix. The most influential of all was Aphra Behn, one of the first English women to earn her living as a writer, who was influential as a novelist, playwright and political propagandist. Although successful in her lifetime, Behn was often vilified as "unwomanly" by 18th-century writers like Henry Fielding and Samuel Richardson. Likewise, the 19th-century critic Julia Kavanagh said that "instead of raising man to woman's moral standards [Behn] sank to the level of man's courseness." Not until the 20th century would Behn gain a wider readership and critical acceptance. Virginia Woolf praised her: "All women together ought to let flowers fall upon the grave of Aphra Behn... for it was she who earned them the right to speak their minds."

Major feminist writers in continental Europe included Marguerite de Navarre, Marie de Gournay and Anna Maria van Schurman, who attacked misogyny and promoted women's education. In Switzerland, the first printed publication by a woman appeared in 1694: in Glaubens-Rechenschafft, Hortensia von Moos argued against the idea that women should stay silent. The previous year saw publication of an anonymous tract, Rose der Freyheit (Rose of Freedom), whose author denounced male dominance and abuse of women.

In the New World, the Mexican nun, Juana Ines de la Cruz (1651–1695), advanced the education of women in her essay "Reply to Sor Philotea". By the end of the 17th century women's voices were becoming increasingly heard at least by educated women. Literature in the last decades of the century was sometimes referred to as the "Battle of the Sexes", and was often surprisingly polemic, such as Hannah Woolley's The Gentlewoman's Companion. However, women received mixed messages, for there was also a strident backlash and even self-deprecation by some women writers in response. They were also subjected to conflicting social pressures: fewer opportunities for work outside the home, and education that sometimes reinforced the social order as much as inspired independent thinking.

== See also ==
- History of feminism
