= Gonzalo Casco =

Spanish military leader and conquistador

- Coat of arms of Casco, according to Don Tirso de Avilés

Alcalde of Asunción
- In office 1574–1575
- Monarch: Philip II

Personal details
- Born: 1533 Avilés, Asturias, Spain
- Died: c.1588 Asunción, Paraguay
- Spouse: María de Mendoza Irala
- Occupation: Politician
- Profession: Army's officer

Military service
- Allegiance: Spain
- Branch/service: Spanish Army
- Rank: Captain

Gonzalo Casco (1533–c.1588) was a Spanish military leader and conquistador of Paraguay.

== Biography ==
Casco was born in Aviles. After being established in Peru, he arrived in Asunción, in the expedition of Ñuflo de Chaves. Time later it held honorary positions in the city, serving like Alcalde in 1574, and Regidor in 1568, 1575 and 1578.

Under the orders of Nufrio de Chaves, Gonzalo Casco participated in the expeditions against the tribes of Mayáes and Tomacocis, native inhabitants of Paraguayan territory.

He was married to María de Mendoza Irala, daughter of Gonzalo de Mendoza, interim governor of the Río de la Plata between 1556 and 1558, and Isabel de Irala, daughter of Domingo Martínez de Irala.

== See also ==
- Juan Abalos de Mendoza
- Juan de Ayolas
- Martín Suárez de Toledo
- Nicolás Colman
- Ulrich Schmidl
