= Juan Abalos de Mendoza =

Paraguayan explorer (1560–1605)

- Born: 1560; Asunción, Paraguay
- Died: 1605 (aged 44–45); Buenos Aires, Viceroyalty of Peru
- Military career
- Allegiance: Spain
- Rank: Captain

Juan Abalos de Mendoza (1560–1605) was an explorer and colonizer in South America born in what is now Paraguay.

== Biography ==
Born in Asunción, his parents were Gonzalo Casco and María de Mendoza Irala daughter of Gonzalo de Mendoza, and granddaughter Domingo Martínez de Irala. Mendoza married first with Bernardina Guerra de Sepúlveda, and after being widowed to Juana Cejas, whom he had three sons. Abalos de Mendoza, came from Asunción to Santiago del Estero, and then permanently established in Buenos Aires, and was appointed Regidor in 1598.

Juan Abalos de Mendoza was a personal friend of the founder of Buenos Aires Juan de Garay.

== See also ==
- Juan de Ayolas
- Martín Suárez de Toledo
- Nicolás Colman
- Ulrich Schmidl
