= Felipe de Cáceres =

Spanish conquistador

Felipe de Cáceres was a Spanish conquistador, accountant, and Governor of Rio de la Plata. He was appointed in 1568 to replace Francisco Ortiz de Vergara as governor of Rio de la Plata.

The Royal Audience at Charcas appointed Cáceres as governor despite the preference of the people of Asunción for Juan Ortiz de Zárate to take over the post. Cáceres had previously assisted Domingo Martínez de Irala in removing Alvar Núñez Cabeza de Vaca from power, and during his administration quarrelled with Fray Pedro de la Torre, the first bishop of Paraguay. Returning from a trip to the mouth of the Paraná, he was accosted upon his return to Asunción and arrested under the authority of the bishop. The viceroy Martin Suarez de Toledo approved the incarceration and ordered de Cáceres removed to Spain. He escaped en route to jail with the help of the Portuguese, but was recaptured by the captain Ruy Diaz Melgarejo.

Preceded by Francisco Ortiz de Vergara	Acting Governor of Rio de la Plata; 1565–1572	Succeeded by Juan Ortiz de Zárate
