= Gonzalo de Mendoza =

Spanish conquistador and colonizer

Gonzalo de Mendoza (around 1510 in Baeza, Spain – 1558 in Asunción, Paraguay) was a Spanish conquistador and colonizer.

== Biography ==
A native of Andalusia in Spain, he joined his brother Pedro at his new colony of New Andalusia in 1536. Together with Juan de Salazar y Espinosa, he founded Nuestra Señora Santa María de la Asunción (Asunción del Paraguay) on 15 August 1537, which soon became the seat of the colony. Under succeeding governors, he acted as their captain and lieutenant, while exploring Paraguay and Brazil.

He succeeded Domingo Martínez de Irala as acting governor of the renamed Governorate of Rio de la Plata in 1556. During his term, the Ciudad Real del Guayrá was founded by Ruy Díaz de Malgarejo at the confluence of the Pepirí-Guazú and Paraná rivers. This city received the settlers of Villa de Ontiveros when it was abandoned and later grew large enough to briefly become the namesake for the governorate of Paraguay.

Mendoza was succeeded in his turn by captain Francisco Ortiz de Vergara in 1558.

Preceded by Domingo Martínez de Irala	Acting Governor of Rio de la Plata; 1556–1558	Succeeded by Francisco Ortiz de Vergara
