= Francisco de Freytas =

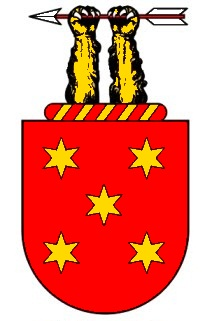
- Born: Portugal
- Died: Asunción, Paraguay
- Military career
- Allegiance: Spanish Empire
- Branch: Spanish Army
- Rank: Captain

Francisco de Freytas was a Portuguese conquistador who arrived in the Río de la Plata with the expedition of Pedro de Mendoza in the 16th century. He was chosen along with other conquistadores to negotiate with Charles I of Spain the supply of arms and provisions for the settlers of Buenos Aires.

De Freytas resided in Asunción, where he was a member of the Cabildo.
