= Guayrá =

Historical region in South America

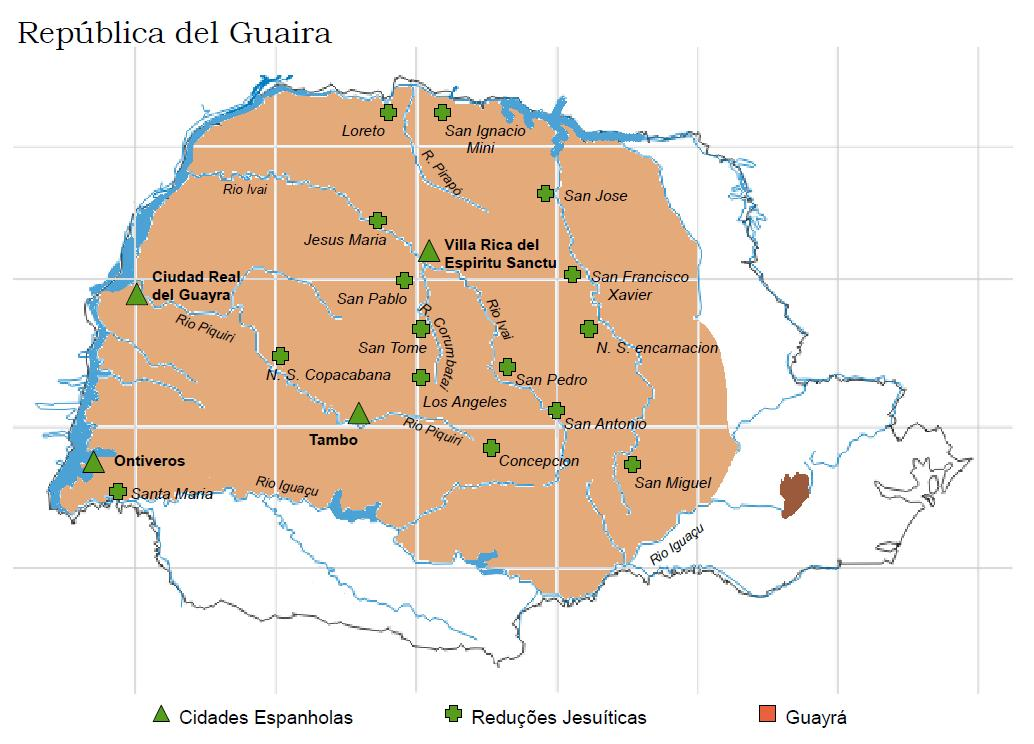
Map the modern state of Paraná showing the Guayrá region in brown, Jesuit missions are marked with crosses and Spanish cities with triangles.

Guayrá (initially called Gobernación del Guayrá) was a historical region of the Spanish Empire, located in the Governorate of Paraguay, within the colonial Viceroyalty of Peru. The region is located in present-day Paraguay and Paraná.

There are some conflicting etymologies for the origin of the name, with some claiming it was named after a cacique of the region whose name was Guayrá or Guayracá. Alternatively, the word might come from Guarani "kwa y ra" ("can not pass", "impassable") or even "guay ra" ("river that goes [beyond]").

== Geography ==
The limits of Guayrá were the Iguazu River on the south, the Paraná River on the west, the Tiete (or Añemby) River to the north, and the line of the Treaty of Tordesillas to the east. The Tiete also marked the boundary between the Tupi and Guarani Indians.

== History ==
The town of Ontiveros was founded by Captain Garcia Rodriguez de Vergara on orders from Domingo Martínez de Irala in 1554. It was located on the left bank of the Paraná, between the Iguazu and Pipiri-Guazu, which according to some sources was about 50 kilometres (31 miles) north of Salto del Guairá, in the territory of the cacique Canendiyu. It was intended to serve as a connection to Portuguese Colonial Brazil.

Ciudad Real del Guayrá, also referred to as Guayrá and the present day Guaíra, Paraná, was founded by Captain Ruy Diaz Melgarejo in 1556. It is on the left bank of the Paraná at the confluence of the Pipiry-Guazu.

Guayrá was covered with dense forest and many rivers, and by 1600, it had become a place of refuge for the Guarani from the encomenderos of Paraguay and the Bandeirantes or esclavistas of Brazil.

Aleixo Garcia crossed the region in 1522. In 1542, Alvar Nunez Cabeza de Vaca travelled through its southern reaches on his way to Asunción from Santa Catarina Island.

=== Jesuit Missions of the Guaranis ===
It was the main region occupied by the Spanish Jesuit reductions of the indigenous peoples, at the Jesuit Missions of the Guaranis. However, it was destroyed by the bandeirantes from São Paulo in 1631.

== See also ==
- Guarani people
- Governorate of Paraguay
- Spanish Jesuit Missions of the Guaranis−related topics — World Heritage Sites
- Governorate of the Río de la Plata
- Viceroyalty of the Río de la Plata
