= Marie de Gournay =

French writer (1565–1645)

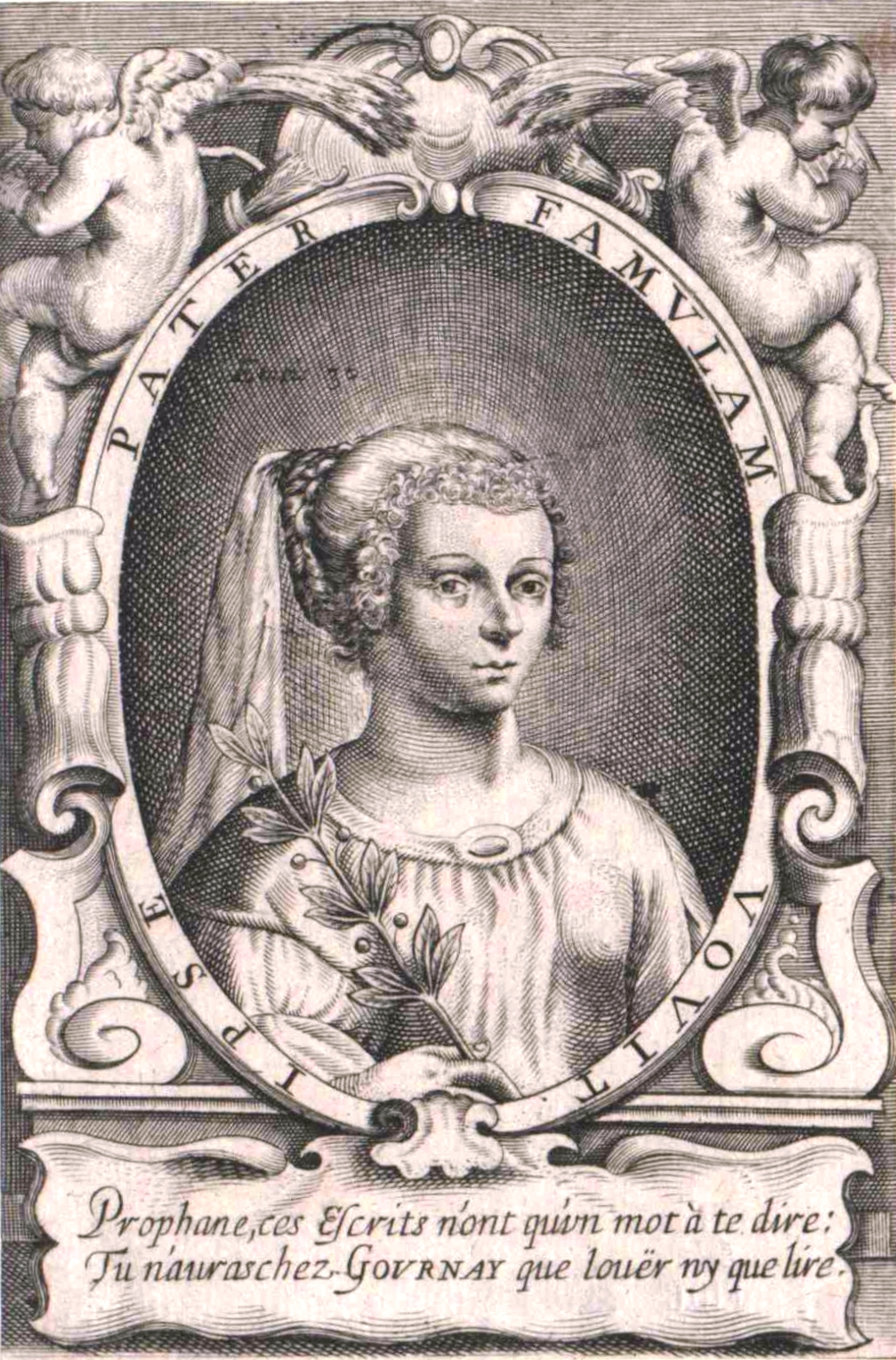
Frontispiece of Marie le Jars de Gournay (unknown date)

Marie de Gournay (French: [maʁi də ɡuʁnɛ]; 6 October 1565 – 13 July 1645) was a French writer. Author of a novel and a number of other literary compositions, including The Equality of Men and Women (Égalité des hommes et des femmes, 1622) and The Ladies' Grievance (Grief des dames, 1626), she insisted that women should be educated. Gournay was also an editor and commentator of Michel de Montaigne. After Montaigne's death, Gournay edited and published his Essays.

== Life ==
She was born in Paris in 1565. Her father, Guillaume Le Jars, was treasurer to King Henry III of France. In 1568, he obtained feudal rights to the Gournay estate in Picardy, and in 1573, after he purchased the Neufvy estate, he became Seigneur de Neufvy et de Gournay. The family moved to Gournay-sur-Aronde after her father's sudden death in 1577.

Gournay was an autodidact. She studied the humanities and taught herself Latin. Her studies led her to discover the works of Michel de Montaigne. She met him in 1588 in Paris after writing him a note and became his "adopted daughter". She published her first book in 1594, Le Proumenoir de Monsieur de Montaigne.

After her mother's death in 1591, Marie moved to Paris, leaving the family home to her brother Charles, who was forced to sell it in 1608. Montaigne died the following year, and his widow, Françoise de la Chassaigne, provided Gournay with a copy of the Essays and charged her with its publication. In 1595, Gournay published the first posthumous edition of his Essays and in 1598 she published a revised edition. She settled in Paris, determined to earn a living from writing. She published a timely discussion on the education of children in 1608, Bienvenue à Monseigneur le Duc d'Anjou. This work brought her to wider attention among Paris intellectuals. Her 1610 work Adieu de l'ame du Roy de France et de Navarre caused a scandal because it defended Jesuits, who were suspected of having conspired to assassinate King Henry IV. Gournay was attacked in the satirical pamphlet The Anti-Gournay and was pictured as an old shrew.

In Paris, Marie de Gournay met Henri Louis Habert de Montmor and the scholar Justus Lipsius presented her to Europe as a woman of letters. Gournay found herself protectors by writing for Queen Margo, Henry IV of France, Marie de Médicis, Louis XIII, the marquise de Guercheville, the ministers Villeroy and Jeannin. Queen Margo became her patron. Gournay was invited to the Queen's royal salon and received financial support on a quarterly basis.

She translated works by Sallust, Ovid, Virgil, and Tacitus. Gournay also wrote verses about her cat Léonore (also the name of Montaigne's daughter) and Joan of Arc, adapted Ronsard, wrote on the instruction of princes, and criticized the Précieuses. In 1619 she published the translation Versions de quelques pièces de Virgile, Tacite, Salluste with a preface in which she opposed François de Malherbe's view that the French language had to be purged. Gournay was accused of being ridiculous, past-orientated, and of being an old maid. In turn, Gournay published a fierce defense of women's rights in 1622, Égalité des Hommes et des Femmes, which she dedicated to Queen Anne d'Autriche. In 1624 she published a bold revision of Pierre de Ronsard's poem Remerciement, au Roy.

In her 1626 novel Le Promenoir de M. de Montaigne qui traite de l’amour dans l’œuvre de Plutarque, she explored the dangers women face when they become dependent on men. A collection of her works was published in 1626 entitled L'ombre de la damoiselle de Gournay. She moved to an apartment on the rue Saint Honoré and helped to establish the French Academy. The small pension granted to her by Cardinal Richelieu allowed her to publish a 1635 edition of Montaigne's Essays. In 1641 she published another collection of her own works Les Advis, ou les Presens de la Demoiselle de Gournay. She died in Paris in 1645, aged 79, and is buried at the Saint-Eustache Church in Paris. Marie de Gournay is now recognized as the first woman in France to contribute to literary criticism and one of the first to argue forcibly on the equality of men and women. Her final collected works ran to nearly 1,000 pages.

== Views on women's education ==
Gournay's arguments for women's right to education had a religious underpinning. Gournay was Roman Catholic and known as an opponent of the Protestant movement in the French wars of religion. She advocated for women's education in two treatises, Égalité des Hommes et des Femmes (The Equality of Men and Women), published 1622, and Grief des Dames (The Ladies' Grievance) published 1626. She argued that men and women were equal because "the virtue of men and virtue of women are the same thing, since God bestowed on them the same creation and the same honor".

"Happy are you, reader, if you do not belong to this sex to which all good is forbidden"

In The Equality of Men and Women, Gournay structured her argument in a manner similar to Christine de Pizan, citing examples of notable women from history to demonstrate women's intellectual capabilities. She emphasized the equality of men and women rather than arguing for the superiority of either sex, while challenging the view that accomplished women were merely exceptions who resembled men. Gournay attributed perceptions of women's inferiority to limited access to education and opportunities, arguing that women could achieve comparable accomplishments if given similar conditions. In the Ladies' Grievance, she addressed social and legal inequalities, noting that women were restricted in property ownership, personal freedom, and participation in public life. She maintained that educated women should have the same right to be heard as educated men. Influenced by contemporary philosophical thought, including that of René Descartes, she distinguished between mind and body, arguing that intellectual capacity was not determined by gender.

== Works ==
- Adieu de l'âme du Roy de France et de Navarre Henry le Grand à la Royne, avec la défence des Pères Jésuites / par la damoiselle de G.
- L'ombre de la damoiselle de Gournay (1626, 1634 and 1641)
- Les advis ou Les présens de la demoiselle de Gournay (1634)
- Les essais de Michel seigneur de Montaigne : nouvelle édition exactement purgée des défauts des precedentes, selon le vray original, et enrichie & augmentée aux marges du nom des autheurs qui y sont citez, & de la version de leurs passages, avec des observations très importantes & necessaires pour le soulagement du lecteur, ensemble la vie de l'auteur, & deux tables, l'une des chapitres, & l'autre des principales matières, de beaucoup plus ample & plus utile que celles des dernieres éditions / [Henri Estienne]; [Marie de Jars de Gournay]
- First volume of her complete works (1641) was published in 1997 by Rodopi

== Publications ==
- Œuvres complètes : Les advis ou Les présens de la demoiselle de Gournay; T. Du Bray, 1634 Lire en ligne sur Gallica
- avant 1588 : un sonnet et une ode dans les « Regrets funèbres sur la mort d'Aymée ». In Œuvres de Pierre de Brach (Le Tombeau d'Aymée)
- 1594 : Le Proumenoir de Monsieur de Montaigne
- 1595 : Préface sur les Essais de Michel, seigneur de Montaigne Lire en ligne sur gallica, in Les Essais de Michel Seigneur de Montaigne
- 1595 : hommage en prose à Jean de Sponde, dans Response du Feu Sieur de Sponde...
- 1598 : Preface sur les Essais de Michel, seigneur de Montaigne, in Les Essais de Michel Seigneur de Montaigne
- 1608 : Bienvenue de Monseigneur le duc d'Anjou
- 1610 : Adieu de l'Ame du Roy de France et de Navarre Henry le Grand, avec la Défense des Peres Jesuites
- 1619 : Versions de quelques pièces de Virgile, Tacite, Salluste, avec l'Institution de Monseigneur, frere unique du Roy (comprend également un « traicté sur la Poësie »).
- 1620 : Eschantillons de Virgile
- 1620 : deux poèmes dans Les Muses en deuil
- 1621 : Traductions. Partie du Quatriesme de l'Eneide, avec une oraison de Tacite, et une de Saluste
- 1622 : Égalité des Hommes et des Femmes
- 1624 : Remerciement, au Roy
- 1626 : L’ombre de la Damoiselle de Gournay – œuvre composée de mélanges – L’homme est l’ombre d’un songe & son œuvre est son ombre qui comprend :

De l'éducation des Enfans de France - Naissance des Enfans de France - Exclamation sur l'assassinat deplorable de l'année 1610 - Adieu de l'ame du Roy à la Reyne Regente son espouse - Priere pour l'ame du mesme Roy, escrite à son trépas - Gratification à Venise sur une victoire - Institution du Prince - Du langage François - De la medisance - Des fausses devotions, Si la vangeance est licite - Antipathie des ames basses et hautes - Consideration sur quelques contes de Cour - Advis à quelques gens d'Église - Que les grands esprits et les gens de bien s'entrecherchent - De la neantise de la commune vaillance de ce temps et du peu de prix de la qualité de Noblesse - Que l'integrité suit la vraye suffisance - Sur la version des Poètes antiques, ou des Metaphores - Chrysante, ou convalescence d'une petite fille - Des Vertus vicieuses - Des Rymes - Des diminutifs François - Des grimaces mondaines - De l'impertinente amitié - Des sottes ou presomptives finesses - Grief des Dames - Défense de la Poësie et du langage des Poètes - Advis sur la nouvelle edition du Promenoir - Promenoir - Apologie pour celle qui escrit - Lettre sur l'art de traduire les Orateurs - Version d'une Oraison de Tacite - Version d'une Oraison de Salluste - Epistre de Laodamie traduicte d'Ovide - Seconde Philippique de Ciceron traduicte - De la façon d'escrire de Messieurs du Perron et Bertault, qui sert d'Advertissement sur les Poesies de ce volume - Partie du Premier de l'Æneide, commençant où monsieur le Cardinal du Perron acheve de le traduire - Second de l'Æneide traduict - Partie du Quatriesme de l'Æneide, commençant comme dessus après monsieur le Cardinal, Bouquet de Pynde, composé de fleurs diverses - Si ce Livre me survit...

- 1628 : trois poèmes, in Recueil de plusieurs inscriptions proposées pour remplir les Tables d'attente estans sous les statues du Roy Charles VII et de la Pucelle d'Orléans...
- 1634 : Les Advis, ou les Presens de la Demoiselle de Gournay (ajoute à L'Ombre : Discours sur ce livre à Sophrosine, Oraison du Roy à S. Louys durant le siège de Rhé, Première delivrance de Casal, De la temerité et la traduction du VIe livre de l'Énéide).
- 1635 : un poème, in Le Sacrifice des Muses
- 1635 : un poème, in Le Parnasse royal
- 1641 : réédition des Advis
- 1642 : deux épigrammes, in le Jardin des Muses
- 1643 : les petits gros hommes dirigent le monde
- 1644 : une épigramme, in l'Approbation du Parnasse qui précède Les Chevilles de Me Adam Menuisier de Nevers

== Bibliography ==
- Conroy, Derval. 'A Defence and Illustration of Marie de Gournay: Bayle’s Reception of ‘Cette Savante Demoiselle’, French Studies Bulletin, 40.152 (2019): 51–54. https://doi.org/10.1093/frebul/ktz009
- Conroy, Derval; 'Marie de Gournay’s “Advis à quelques gens d’Église” and the Early Modern Rigorist Debate. Romanic Review 112.3 (2021): 423–36. doi: https://doi.org/10.1215/00358118-9377342
- Dezon-Jones Elyane, Marie de Gournay. Fragments d’un discours féminin, Paris, José Corti, 1988.
- Fogel Michèle, Marie de Gournay, itinéraires d’une femme savante, Paris, Fayard, 2004.
- Schiff, Mario (1910). La Fille d'alliance de Montaigne, Marie de Gournay. Paris: Honoré Champion.
- Les historiettes de Tallemant des Réaux, t. II, p. 124-128, Paris, 1834.
- Œuvres complètes réalisées par J.-C. Arnould, E. Berriot-Salvadore, M.-C. Bichard-Thomine, C. Blum, A. L. Franchetti, V. Worth-Stylianou, Paris, Honoré Champion, 2002.
- Égalité des hommes et des femmes, suivi de Grief des Dames, édition établie par Claude Pinganaud et présentée par Séverine Auffret, Paris, Arléa, 2008.
- Beaulieu J.P., Fournier H. "Pratiques Dialogiques et réécriture dans l'oeuvre de Marie de Gournay", Neophilologus, volume 82, number 3 (1998), 357–367, DOI:10.1023/A:1004225101249.
- Noiset Marie-Thérèse, "Marie de Gournay et le caprice des siècles", Études françaises, vol. 29, n° 3, 1993, p. 193-205. Texte intégral.
- Dezon-Jones Elyane, "Marie de Gournay" in Writings by Pre-Revolutionary French Women, Anne R. Larsen, Colette H. Winn, New York, Garland, 1999, 237–42.
- Freeman Ring, Lynn Wendy, 'In Her Own Fashion': Marie de Gournay and the Fabrication of the Writer's Persona, 2007. texte intégral.
- Frelick Nancy, "(Re)Fashoning Marie de Gournay" in La Femme au XVII^{e} siècle. Actes du colloque de Vancouver. University of British Columbia. 5-7 octobre 2000 édités par Richard G. Hodgson, Tübingen, Gunter Narr, 2002. https://books.google.com/books?id=UY8ONbC9l9ECpg=PP1 extrais.
- Venesoen Constant, "Mademoiselle de Gournay" in Études sur la Littérature féminine du XVIIe siècle, Birmingham, Summa, 1990, p. 13-42 Texte intégral
- Maryanne Cline Horowitz, "Marie de Gournay, Editor of the Essais of Michel de Montaigne : A Case-Study in Mentor-Protegee Friendship", The Sixteenth Century Journal, vol. 17, n°3, autumn, 1986, p. 271-284. texte disponible.
- Poudérou Robert, Parce que c'était lui, parce que c'était moi, pièce de théâtre parue en 1992 mettant en scène Michel de Montaigne, Marie de Gournay et Françoise de La Chassaigne Dossier de presse.
- Jean-Claude Idée, Parce que c'était lui, pièce de théâtre parue en 2014 dans les Cahiers des Universités Populaires du Théâtre et jouée au Théâtre Montparnasse, à Paris.
- Marie de Gournay, "Escritos sobre la igualdad y en defensa de las mujeres" M. Cabré i Pairet & E. Rubio Hernández (Eds.) Spanish translation by M. Cabré i Pairet, E. Rubio Hernández & E. Teixidor Aránegui. Madrid, CSIC, 2014. http://libros.csic.es/product_info.php?products_id=772.
- Jenny Diski, "Apology for the Woman Writing", Virago Press, 2008 ISBN 9781844083855 : a work of historical fiction based on the life of Marie de Gournay

== See also ==
- Protofeminism
- Feminism
