= Ulrich Schmidl =

German conquistador and chronicler (c. 1510–1581)

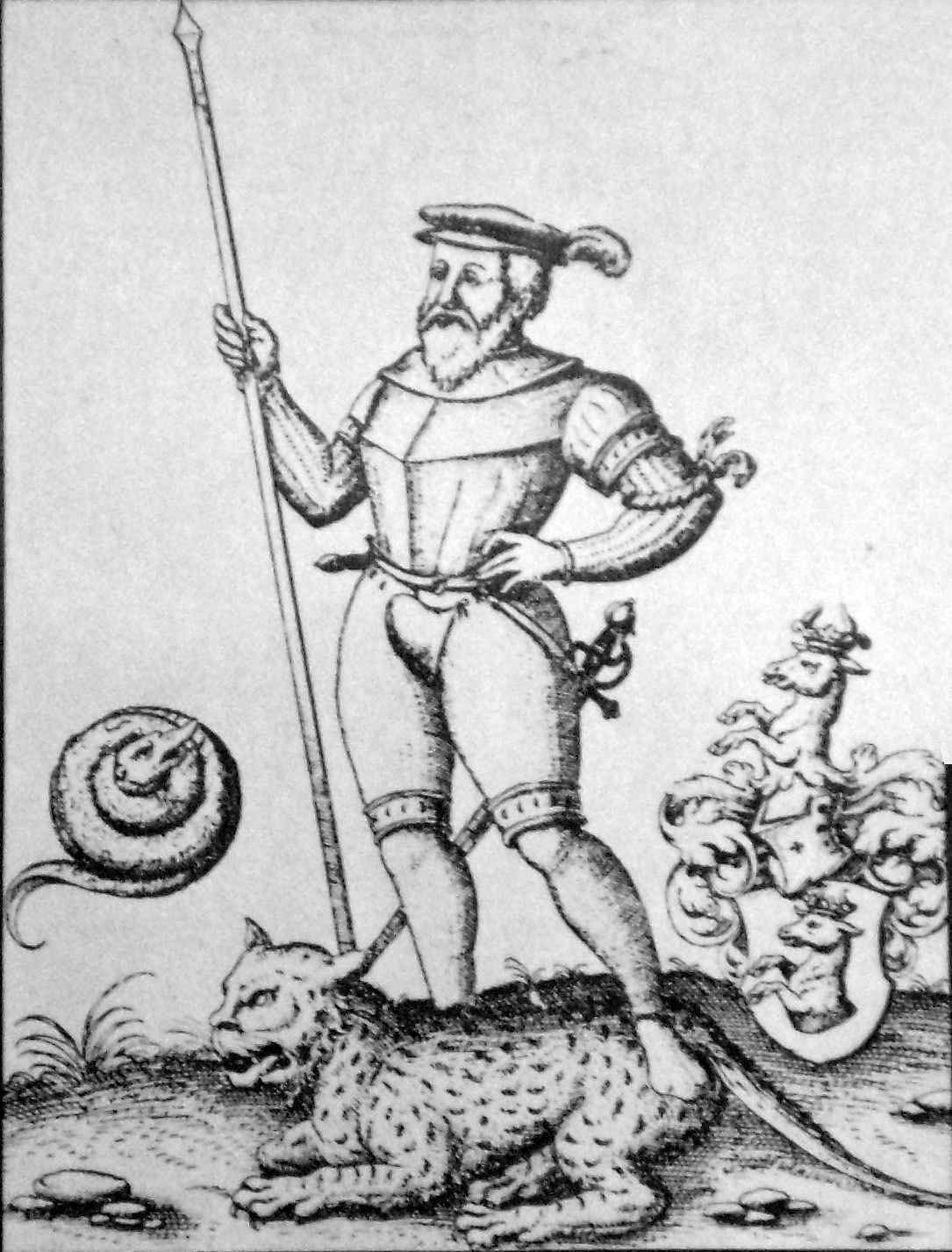
Ulrich Schmidl, engraving from Levinus Hulsius, 1599

Ulrich Schmidl or Schmidel (c. 1510 - 1581) was a German conquistador and chronicler. Between 1534 and 1554 he took part in the Spanish conquest of the Río de la Plata region. Upon his return to Germany in 1554 he wrote a narrative of his adventures in the New World. His account is one of the earliest and most important sources of information about the history of the region during that time period. Historians regard his account as generally reliable.

== Biography ==
Schmidel was born between 1500 and 1511 in Straubing, Bavaria. He was the son of a wealthy merchant named Wolfgang Schmidel. His surname appeared variously as "Schmidel" or "Schmidl" or "Schmeidel" but contemporary evidence shows that most of his family used "Schmidel".

He entered military service and took part in 1534 as a Landsknecht under Pedro de Mendoza in an expedition to today's Argentina (the Río de la Plata). He also accompanied Juan de Ayolas on his first trip in quest of provisions, and afterward went with Ayolas in his expedition up the Paraguay River, and was one of the soldiers that were left with Domingo Irala in charge of the vessels in Puerto la Candelaria (modern Fuerte Olimpo).

When Cabeza de Vaca was deposed in April 1544, Schmidel supported Irala, the new governor, and in 1546 accompanied him in his expedition to Peru as far as the foot of the Andes, where he was dispatched with Nuño de Chaves to President La Gasca. He accompanied Irala on his last unfortunate expedition of 1550.

He became a founder of Buenos Aires. His journey led him across the Río Paraná and Paraguay River and into today's Paraguay, where he helped to found Asunción. From there he undertook several expeditions in the Gran Chaco, which led him into southeast Bolivia.

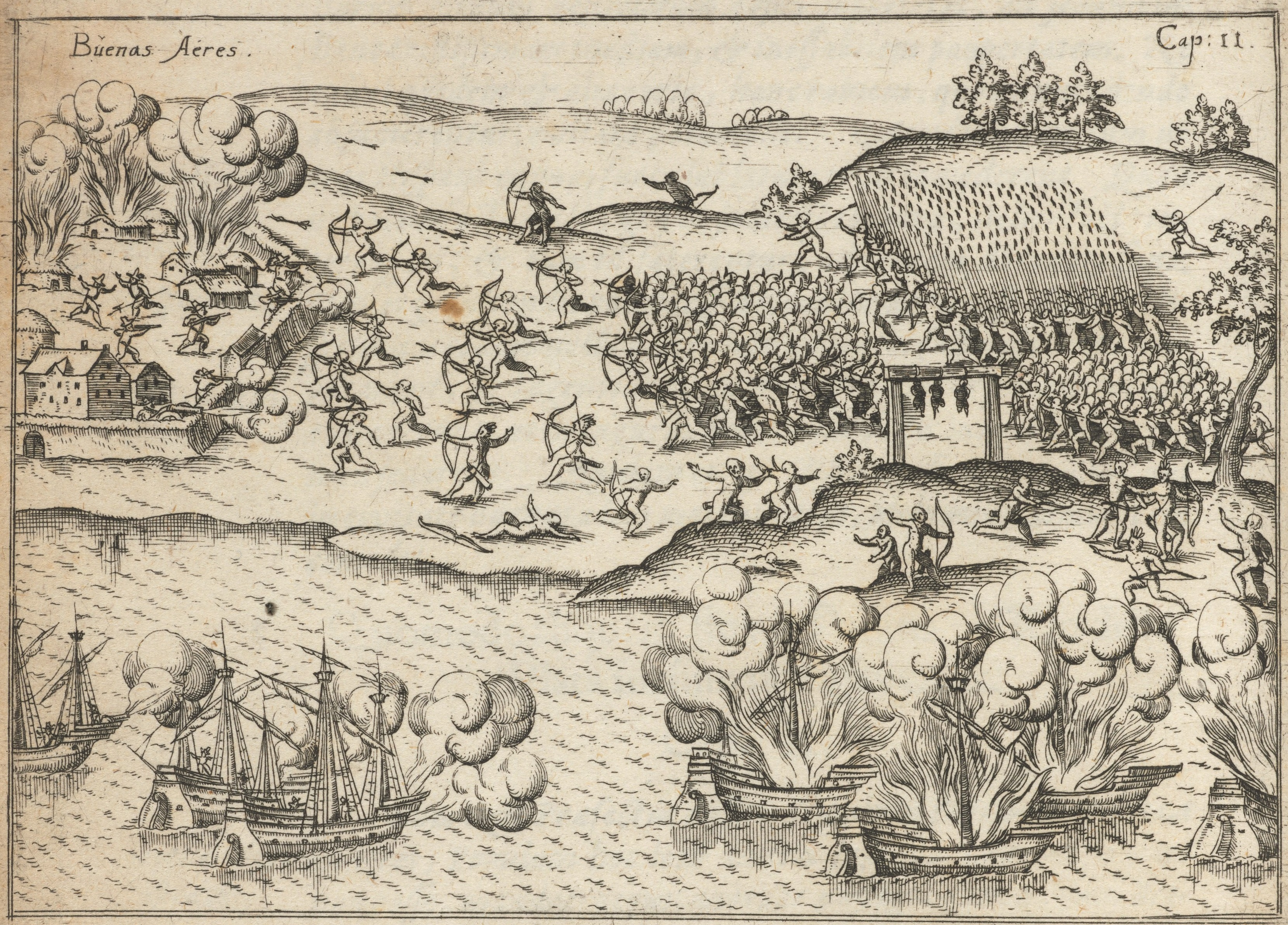
Illustration from Vera historia, 1599

In 1552, on learning of the death of his elder brother to whose estate he was to succeed, Schmidl obtained his discharge. In Seville, he presented to the council of the Indies letters from Irala with the report of his discoveries, and arrived toward the close of 1554 in Straubing, where he afterward resided.

He had kept a diary during his wanderings, and wrote a narrative of his adventures under the title of Wahre Geschichte einer merkwürdigen Reise, gemacht durch Ulrich Schmidel von Straubingen... (True story of a remarkable journey made by Ulrich Schmidel von Straubingen...), of which a Latin version appeared in Nuremberg in 1599 as Vera historia....

Much of his account in the German language overlaps with an account written in Spanish by Álvar Núñez Cabeza de Vaca, who was adelantado of the Governorate of the Río de la Plata between 1540 and 1545. Their accounts, one by a German mercenary, another by a Spanish nobleman, offer stark differences in point of view.

His narrative gives the names and tells of the habits and manner of living of many Indigenous American nations that were extinct a century later. Perhaps the most fascinating parts of his accounts are those that attribute cannibalism not only to some South American tribes, but also to the desperate conquistadors who were unsuited for survival in the rough climate, and would consume one another in an effort to escape starvation. A particularly notable account states that Spaniards who were hung, were hacked up by their fellow countrymen, and devoured.

After his return to Straubing with a few pieces of booty, he inherited the fortune of his deceased brother, and became a councilman. Because of religious strife he had to leave Straubing and went in 1562 to Regensburg, where he died around 1579.

== See also ==
- Juan Abalos de Mendoza
- Juan de Ayolas
- Gonzalo Casco
- Martín Suárez de Toledo
- Nicolás Colman

== Sources ==
English

- Frawley, William, ed. (2007). "Schmidel, Ulrich". The Oxford companion to world exploration. Oxford reference online. Oxford: Oxford Univ. Press. ISBN 978-0-19-530741-2.
- Howgego, Raymond John, ed. (2003). "Schmidel, Ulrich". Encyclopedia of Exploration to 1800. Hordern House. ISBN 1875567364.
- Huffines, Marion Lois (1977). "The Original Manuscript of Ulrich Schmidl: German Conquistador and Chronicler". The Americas. 34 (2): 202–206. doi:10.2307/981353. ISSN 0003-1615.
- Schmidel, Ulrich; Hernandez, Pero (1891). Luis L. Dominguez (ed.). The Conquest of the River Plate (1535–1555). The Hakluyt Society. OCLC 166620573.
- Tucker, Gene Rhea (2011). "The Discovery of Germany in America: Hans Staden, Ulrich Schmidel, and the Construction of a German Identity". Traversea: The Journal of Transatlantic History. 1 (1).

Non-English

- Häberlein, Mark (2007). "Schmidl, Ulrich - Deutsche Biographie". Neue Deutsche Biographie (in German).
- Schmidel, Ulrich (1889). Valentin Langmantel (ed.). Reise nach Süd-Amerika in den Jahren 1534 bis 1554 (in German). Tübingen: Litterarischer Verein in Stuttgart. OCLC 29076934.
- Schmidel, Ulrich (1903). Samuel A. Lafone Quevedo (ed.). Viaje al Río de la Plata, 1534–1554 (in Spanish). Buenos Aires: Cabaut y Cía. OCLC 11160770.
