= Juan Ortiz de Zárate =

Spanish Basque explorer and conquistador

Juan Ortiz de Zarate
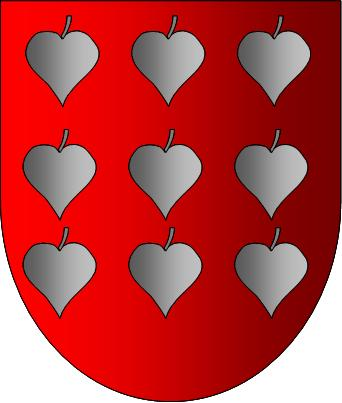
- Arms of the Ortiz de Zarate family
- Born: c. 1521; Orduña, Biscay, Spain
- Died: 1575; Asunción, Paraguay

Juan Ortiz de Zárate (c. 1521 – 1575) was a Spanish Basque explorer and conquistador. He journeyed to the Americas as a teenager, where he took part in the conquest of Peru under Diego de Almagro.

On the removal of Francisco Ortiz de Vergara from office, he was the conquistadors' preferred choice to be his replacement, but the Royal Audience required he return to Spain for confirmation by the Council of the Indies while Felipe de Cáceres governed in his stead.

He returned to Spain and was appointed the third adelantado of the Governorate of the Río de la Plata, with the goal of exploring and populating the lands, founding towns, and introducing cattle and horses. His expedition left the port of Sanlúcar de Barrameda in October 1572 but reached the mouth of the Plata more than a year later, disembarking at the location of present-day Colonia, Uruguay.

Zárate attempted to subdue the Charrúa, who had destroyed several previous settlements in what is now Uruguay, but he was attacked and forced to seek shelter on Martín García Island. Juan de Garay, who had just founded the city of Santa Fe, was sent for and promptly came to the rescue; the combined forces defeated the Charrúas. Ortiz de Zárate was forced to leave a permanent guard at the settlement, while he marched to Asunción to assume his post as governor.

He held this office until his death in 1575. He willed his authority to his daughter Juana, but was succeeded by her husband, Juan Torres de Vera y Aragón.

Preceded by Felipe de Cáceres	Governor of Río de la Plata; 1572–1575	Succeeded by Juan Torres de Vera y Aragón
