= Ruy Diaz Melgarejo =

Spanish conquistador

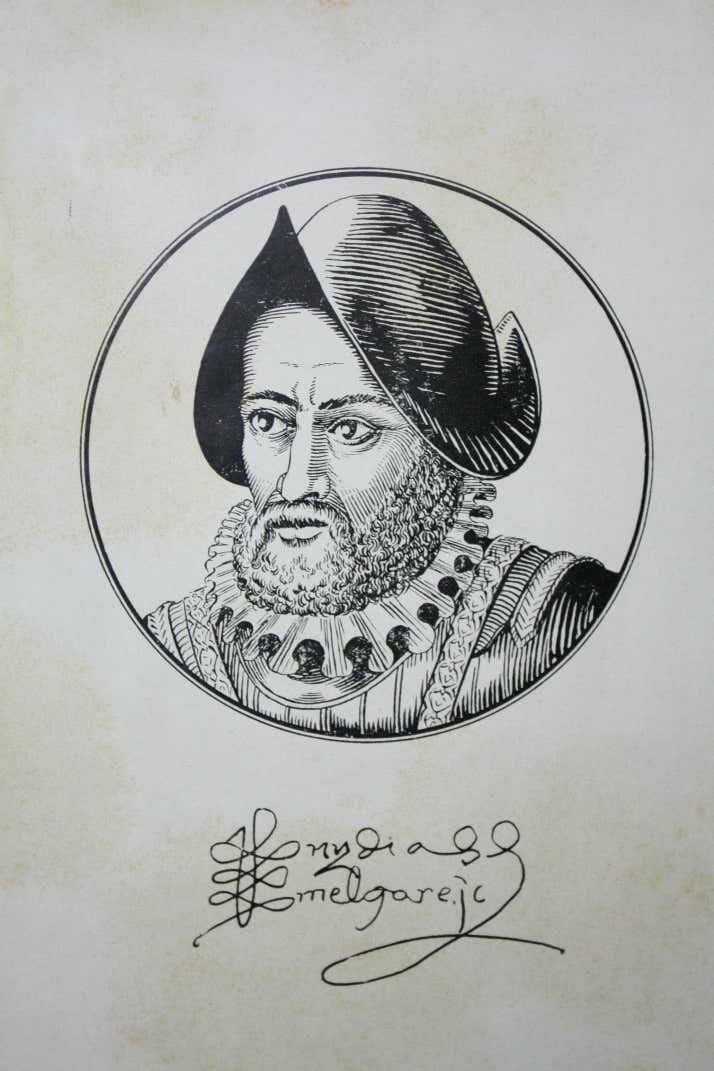
- Imaginary portrait and signature of Melgarejo
- Born: 1518; Salteras, Crown of Castile
- Died: 1602 (aged 83–84); Santa Fe, Spanish Empire
- Spouse: Elvira de Becerra
- Parents: Francisco de Vergara (father); Beatriz de Roelas (mother)

Ruy Diaz de Melgarejo (Salteras, Castile 1519 – Santa Fe, Río de la Plata 1602) was a Spanish conquistador and statesman who served in the settlement and defense of the possessions of the Crown of Castile in the region of Río de la Plata in South America. His life was marked by wars, conspiracies, persecutions and family conflicts. Melgarejo enjoyed the favor of the Spanish crown. He almost absolutely ruled the independent province of Guayrá for 30 years.

== Early life and arrival to South America ==
Ruy Díaz Ortiz Melgarejo was born in Salteras of Seville, in the southernmost region of Andalusia. His parents were Francisco de Vergara y Ribera (1489) and Beatriz de las Roelas (1499).

His paternal grandparents were Fernando de Vergara (1459) and his third spouse Francisca de Riber (1469). His maternal grandparents were Ruy Díaz Ortiz Melgarejo (n. ca. 1469), from whom he adopted his lastname, lord of Torres de Guadiamar and was part of the expedition of the Catholic Monarchs on the Granada War, and his wife named Leonor de Herrera (1479).

He was also great grandson of Mosén García de Vergara, originally from Guipúzcoa who settled in Seville in 1449, where he was knighted into the Order of Santiago and appointed as commander of the villages of Benazuza and Mures, and of his wife named Beatriz Fernández de Marmolejo (1439).

He had three siblings, Hernando, Juana and Francisco Ortiz de Vergara, who became Governor of Rio de la Plata between 1558 and 1564.

Melgarejo left Italy on 1 November 1540, on an expedition led by Álvar Núñez Cabeza de Vaca to Río de la Plata. He remained with de Vaca until, in 1544, the latter was removed from his position. de Vaca's protest against the crown's removal of his position led to his jailing.

In the late 1540s Melgarejo organized the election of his relative Diego de Abreu to the post of Governor of Asunción, deposing Fernando Mendoza, who had been appointed governor by de Vaca's deputy. De Abreu was recognized as governor, but Melgarejo and de Abreu were forced to flee Asunción when de Abreu ordered Mendoza's death. The two spent seven years in hiding before de Abreu was killed and Melgarejo was again jailed.

Melgarejo escaped from jail, but was captured by Tupi Indians who killed and ate his traveling companion. He escaped captivity due to his forming a relationship with a female member of the tribe. The two would leave the tribe and travel to San Vincente, where they were married. Melgarejo, however, found his wife in the company of another lover. After the discovery, Melgarejo killed them both, which again led to him fleeing. In 1555, Melgarejo returned to Asunción, where he was welcomed by the current governor, Domingo Martínez de Irala.

Melgarejo married Elvira de Becerra, a woman of noble peerage from Extremadura. Elvira was the sister-in-law of Juan de Garay and a descendant of powerful dynasties of the former medieval kingdoms of Castile and Leon, the Houses of Mendoza and Guzman. They had at least four children together.

== Later successes ==
Melgarejo was active in establishing settlements along the Paraná River. Melgarejo founded Villarrica in May 1570. The name, translated as "rich town", was selected due to Melgarejo's belief that there were silver mines nearby. He was later sent by de Irala to "conquer and settle" Guayrá. Melgarejo was the leader of an expedition to Ontiveros, then capital of the region, a city founded three years earlier by another Irala lieutenant. However, Melgarejo thought that the site was uninhabitable and abandoned it. He instead created a new settlement, Ciudad Real, on higher ground across the Paraná River from the original Ontiveros site.

He was to be replaced as governor in 1570 by Alanzo Riguelme, but before Riguelme could take office his credentials were revoked and he was arrested. Melgarejo was instructed to bring Riguelme and Felipe de Caceres back to Spain. They embarked in 1573. Bad weather early in the voyage forced them to stop at the port of San Vicente in Brazil, where Melgarejo was commissioned to assist the Governor in battles against natives. His success in these battles led to his increased popularity with the government, which in turn led to increased opportunities to make additional expeditions to explore and settle the Paraguayan interior. His successes in his naval commands and as a leader of settlement parties led to him becoming known as the "Invincible Captan."

== Legacy ==
- Three streets have been named Ruy Diaz de Melgarejo after him. One in his birthplace Salteras, one in a ciity he founded Villarrica and another one in Asuncion.
- At the entrance of the city of Villarrica, there is a statue and a plaque dedicated to him.
- Bernardino Caballero. Founder of the Colorado Party and former President of Paraguay, was a descendant of his sister, Juana.
- Paraguayan author Ramon I Cardozo wrote an biographic essay about him titled Melgarejo.
