= Mencía Calderón =

Mencía Calderón y Ocampo
- Adelantada of the New World
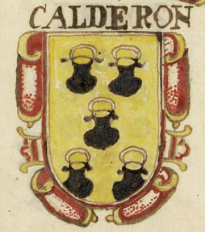
- Coat of Arms belonging to his paternal surname
- Born: 1514; Medellín, Spain
- Died: c. 1564; Asunción, Paraguay
- Spouse: Juan de Sanabria y Alonso de Hinojosa
- Father: Alonso Calderón
- Mother: Ana Ocampo

Mencía Calderón y Ocampo (1514 – c. 1564) was a Spanish noble lady, first expeditionary woman in the Río de la Plata.

== Biography ==
Mencía Calderón y Ocampo was born in Medellín, Badajoz, Spain, daughter of Alonso Calderón and Ana Ocampo, belonging to a noble family of Extremadura. She was married to Juan de Sanabria, a noble Spanish expeditionary who died shortly before leaving for New Spain. Through his mother, Mencía Calderón, was related to Francisco Pizarro and Hernán Cortés, belonging to noble Castilian families.

On 10 April 1550 Mencía Calderón embarked to America. In the expedition traveled 300 passengers, among which there were captains Salazar and Saavedra, Calderon's daughters, 50 eligible maidens, the wives of various conquerors, 80 sailors, and adventurer Hans Staden, who would write the chronicle of the expedition. The fleet survived storms and attacks by French corsairs before managing to reach the isle of Santa Catalina. From there, they made their way to the coast of Brazil, where they settled for a year while repairing their ships and building new, more fit ones with what was left of the others. After this period of rest they left to Asunción.

The arguments between Salazar y Saavedra became constant, and it was Mencía who managed to organize the expedition and keep the group together. Mencía took the rank of Adelantada upon herself and led an expedition of 21 women and 22 men across 1.600 km of rainforest, following the same path that years before had followed Alejo García and Alvar Núñez Cabeza de Vaca. They reached Asunción in 1555, where some problems erupted when the women who had come to meet their husbands found them already remarried to indigenous women, and with mestizo children, some of which were already in their teens.
