= Tránsito Amaguaña =

Ecuadorian leader of the indigenous movement

- Born: September 10, 1909; Pesillo, Pichincha, Ecuador
- Died: May 10, 2009 (aged 99)
- Occupation: Activist
- Awards: Premio Manuela Espejo (1997) Premio Eugenio Espejo (2003)

Rosa Elena Tránsito Amaguaña Alba (September 10, 1909 – May 10, 2009) was an Ecuadorian leader of the indigenous movement and one of the founders of the Ecuadorian Indian Federation (FEI) along with Dolores Cacuango. She was awarded the Premio Eugenio Espejo in 2003 by President Lucio Gutiérrez for her lifetime work in the indigenous movement.

== Biography ==
She was born in 1909 to Venancio Amaguaña and Mercedes Alba. They were a family of slaves and ‘property’ of the landowner, Tránsito Amaguaña helped her parents on their small piece of land. The family worked seven days a week for no pay and in return could cultivate food on that land to grow and eat.

As it was common for girls to be raped by the landowners, Tránsito’s mother decided her daughter would be better marrying an older man. She was married at the age of 15 to a 25-year-old and became pregnant almost immediately. Tránsito’s husband was cruel and beat her repeatedly. The young Tránsito became involved in the Socialist Party and on discovering this her husband beat her so violently that he tired himself out, the next morning she discovered her baby dead in his cot.

Transito continued to attend meetings and became more and more involved in politics and the injustices of the indigenous people of Ecuador. By the time she was able to free herself from her violent husband she had two more children by him.

On her own, Tránsito continued to work the land in exchange for food for herself and her children. In 1930 she helped to set up the first indigenous organization of her country and took part in 26 marches to the capital, Quito, to demand justice for her people. Quito was 66 kilometers from her home and Tránsito did this carrying her two children.

On her own initiative and without government support, in 1945 she started rural schools, founding four bilingual schools (Quichua-Spanish) in the Cayambe area, recalls Ecuadorimediato. She helped organize and took part in the first worker’s union. One strike lasted three months until the military moved in and destroyed the workers homes and detained them. Tránsito had to live the next 15 months of her life in hiding from the authorities. Among her people she was greatly admired, but the authorities constantly threatened her. She later joined the Communist Party and traveled to Cuba and the Soviet Union to represent the Ecuadorian people. Tránsito was arrested on return from one of these tours and detained, accused of trafficking weapons and Bolshevik money to incite revolution, all she had was documentation for promoting land reforms. She was released after 4 months after being made to sign a declaration that she would not continue ‘agitating’ her people. But of course she did not stop, in true style of the revolutionary woman that she was, she continued her work, fighting for equality and justice for her people.

Tránsito retired on a state pension and died of unknown causes in her home village of Pesillo in 2009. Her funeral was attended by President Rafael Correa and vice president Lenín Moreno and various indigenous leaders.

== See also ==
- Micaela Bastidas
- Dolores Cacuango
- India Juliana
- María la Grande
- Bartolina Sisa
