= Dolores Cacuango =

Ecuadorian indigenous rights activist

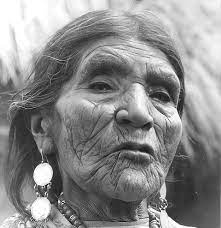
- Born: 26 October 1881; San Pablo Urco, Pesillo Hacienda, Cayambe Canton, Ecuador
- Died: 23 April 1971 (aged 89); Yanahuayco, Cayambe Canton, Ecuador

Dolores Cacuango (26 October 1881 - 23 April 1971), also known as Mamá Doloreс, was a pioneer in the fight for indigenous and farmers rights in Ecuador. She stood out in the political arena and was one of the first activists of Ecuadorian feminism, between the 1930s and 1960s. She founded the Federación Ecuatoriana de Indios (FEI) in 1944 with the help of Ecuador's Communist Party.

== Biography ==
Dolores Cacuango was born in 1881 in San Pablo Urco on the Pesillo Hacienda near Cayambe, Ecuador, of parents of indigenous heritage. Her parents were peons, who worked in haciendas as unpaid laborers. Growing up, she had no access to education due to lack of resources. At the age of fifteen, she worked for the owner of the hacienda as a domestic servant and was struck by the disparity between the living conditions of the landlords and the peons.

Dolores never learned how to read or write. She learned Spanish in Quito, where she worked as a housemaid at a young age.

During her political life, she led many rebellions against the systemic abuse of the owners of haciendas (hacendados) and their administrators. She was a key figure in the indigenous struggle leading towards the Land Reform law in Ecuador, which was promulgated in October 1973. She had also promoted the foundation of bilingual schools; in 1946 she founded the first school of its kind in Ecuador, which taught in both Quechua and Spanish.

One of the political influences of Caucango was an indigenous man called Juan Albamocho, who was a beggar. He used to sit near a lawyer's office while eavesdropping on their conversations, which led to him reporting the creation of a law protecting indigenous people to his local community in Cayambe. This prompted them to start using the law to defend themselves from the abuse of landowners and the church.

In 1927, she married Luis Catucuamba. They lived in Yanahuayco, near Cayambe. The couple had nine children, eight of which died at a young age. The cause of death was bowel disease due to the lack of hygiene and sanitation in the area. The only child who lived to adulthood was Luis Catucuamba, who became an indigenous teacher in his homeland in 1946.

In 1971, Dolores died. During her last years, she became paraplegic and lost a significant amount of weight, making her unable to visit local communities and organizations.

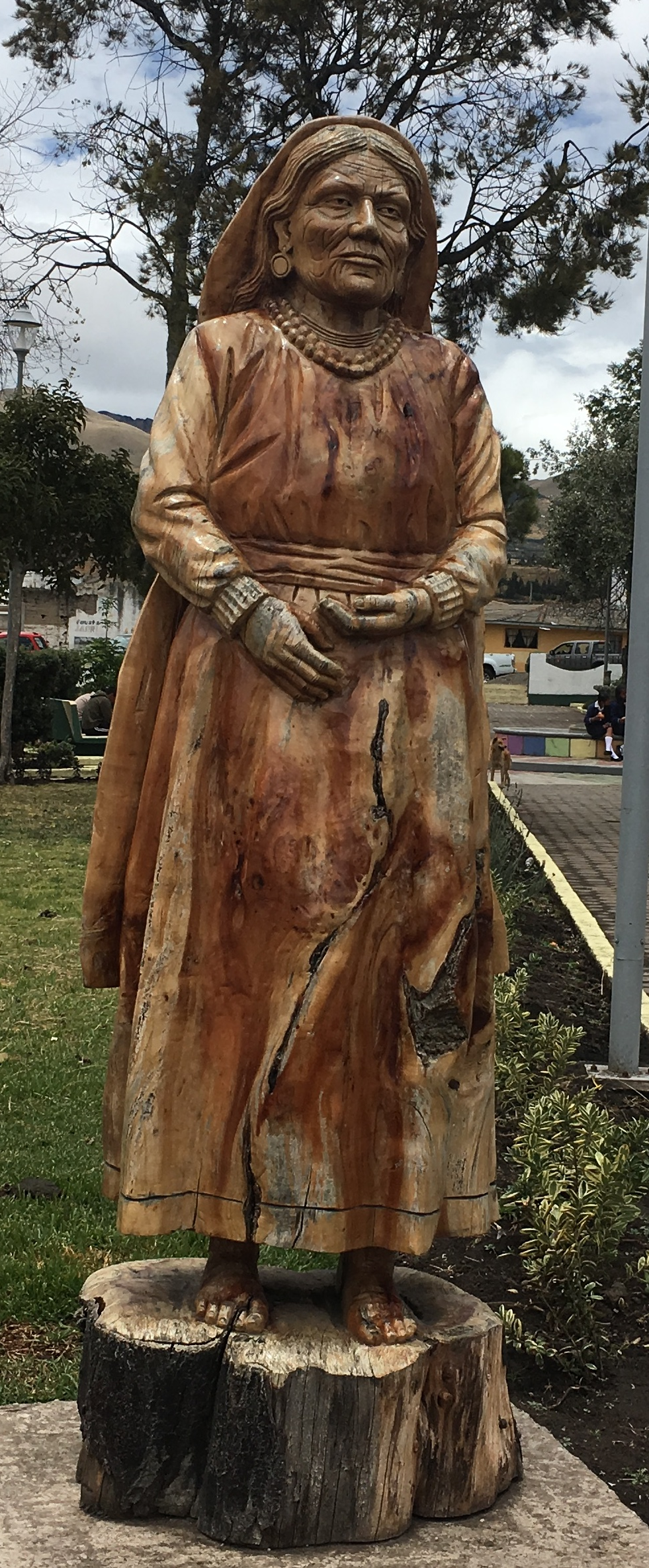
Statue of Dolores Cacuango in Parque Central de Olmedo, Ecuador

== Activism ==
In 1930, Cacuango was among the leaders of the historic workers' strike at the Pesillo hacienda in Cayambe. The strike was a milestone for indigenous and peasant rights, and was later the subject of Jorge Icaza's novel Huasipungo (1934).

During the May 1944 Revolution in Ecuador, Cacuango personally led an assault on a government military base. Along with fellow activist Tránsito Amaguaña, she founded the Indigenous Federation of Ecuador (FEI), one of the first primary organisations to position, demand and fight for indigenous rights.

While Cacuango never received a formal education, she helped establish the first bilingual Indian schools. Aware of the terrible conditions that the children of indigenous peoples suffered in the schools, she ultimately founded bilingual schools, taught in both Spanish and Quechua, the indigenous language. She established these schools in the Cayambe zone in 1945. Cacuango proposed that these schools teach the pupils to read in both languages. Her schools functioned for 18 years, but the military junta closed them in 1963, considering them as communist focos.

Cacuango was an outspoken Communist and was imprisoned for her activism.

== Death and legacy ==
Dolores Cacuango, or Mama Dulu, as she was known, died in 1971. Her son, Luis Catucuamba Cacuango (b. 1924), taught at the Yanahuaico Indigenous school from 1945 to 1963, until the schools were shut down by the junta.

In 1988, the Ministry of Education recognized the necessity of bettering the education of the indigenous people of Ecuador.

The National Direction of Bilingual Intercultural Education was also created. The Aleiodes cacuangoi species of wasp is named after her.

On October 26, 2020, Google celebrated her 139th birthday with a Google Doodle.

In 2023, a new species of snake found in Ecuador and probably endemic to the country was named Tropidophis cacuangoae after her.

== See also ==
- Tránsito Amaguaña
- María la Grande
- Micaela Bastidas
- India Juliana
- Bartolina Sisa
