= Juan de Salazar de Espinosa =

Spanish explorer

Juan de Salazar y Espinosa
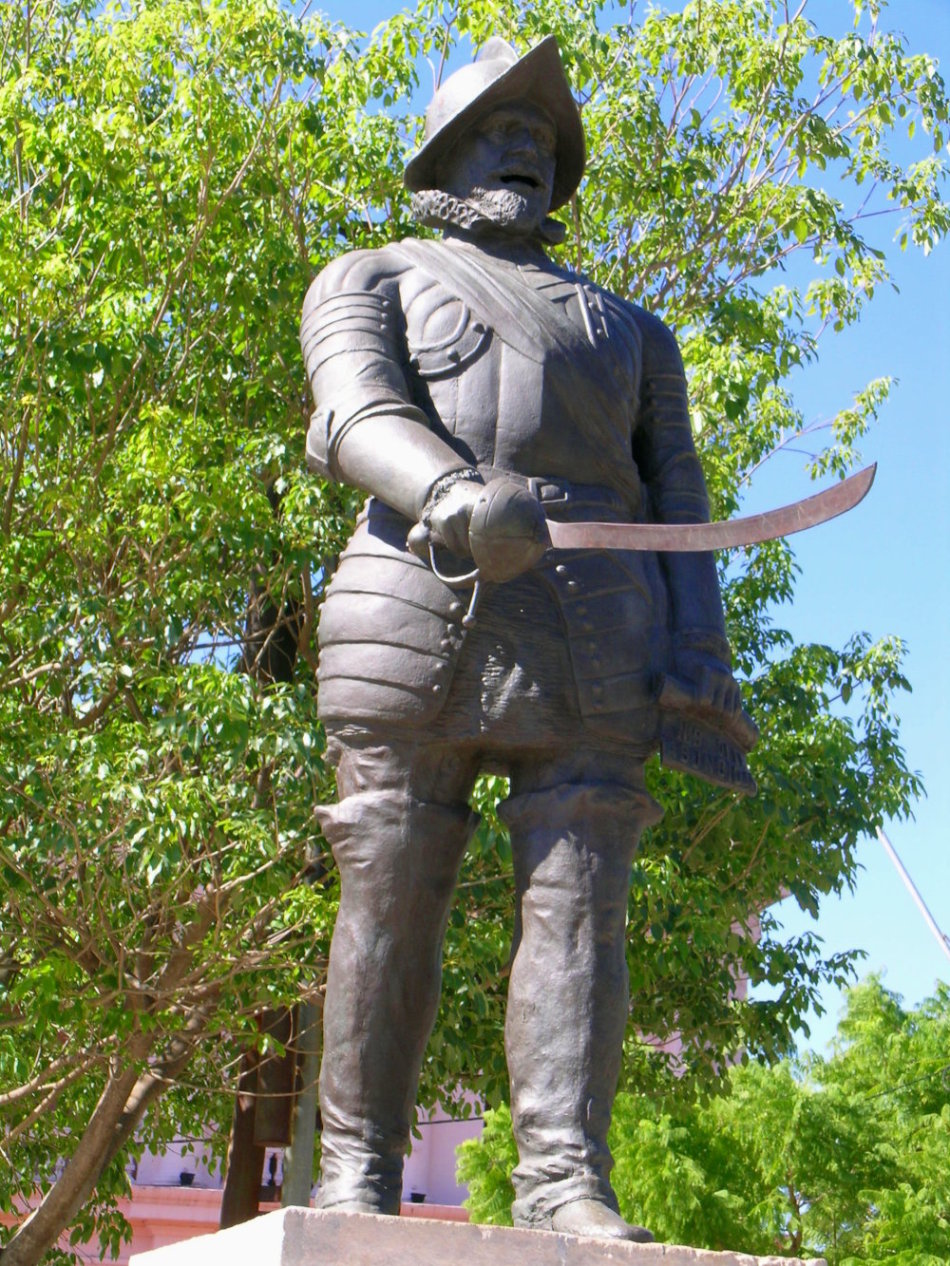
- Statue of Juan de Salazar in Asunción
- Born: 1508; Espinosa de los Monteros, Crown of Castile
- Died: 11 February 1560 (aged 51–52); Asunción, Viceroyalty of Peru, Spanish Empire
- Occupations: Soldier, conquistador

Juan de Salazar y Espinosa (1508–1560) was a Spanish conquistador, founder of the Paraguayan capital, Asunción.

== Biography ==
Espinosa was born in the city of Espinosa de los Monteros, Spain in 1508. Not much is known about his early life. He was a knight of the Order of Santiago.

In August 1535 he set sail from Cádiz as a member of the expeditionary Pedro de Mendoza, who set sail towards the region of the Río de la Plata, arriving to its estuary in January 1536. After assisting Pedro de Mendoza in the first foundation of Buenos Aires, Juan de Salazar de Espinosa was then sent to look for Juan de Ayolas, who had been sent earlier by Pedro de Mendoza to explore the Paraná and the Paraguay River. He managed to find another member of Ayolas' party, Domingo Martínez de Irala, holed up in the Puerto de la Candelaria, which was founded by Ayolas in February 1537.

While continuing his trip in the search of Ayolas, he founded a fort on the eastern banks of the Paraguay River which he named "Our Lady of Asunción", due to that day, August 15, being the Christian celebration of the Assumption of Mary. He then traveled as far as San Pedro to look for Ayolas, only to discover that he had been killed by the Chaco indigenous peoples.

Juan de Salazar y Espinosa is credited for having founded the first permanent European settlement in this region of the Río de la Plata: Asunción, which would become the capital of Paraguay. In 1544, he was expelled to Spain for having taken sides along the disgraced former governor of the Río de la Plata, Álvar Núñez Cabeza de Vaca. He returned to the region in 1550, in an expedition led by Diego de Sanabria. He died in 1560 in the city he had founded, Asunción.
