= Juan de Sanabria =

Spanish nobleman and conquistador (1504-1549)

Tercer Adelantado of the Río de la Plata
- Monarch: Charles I

Personal details
- Born: Juan de Sanabria y Alonso de Hinojosa; 1504 Trujillo, Cáceres, Spain
- Died: 1549 (aged 44–45) Seville, Spain
- Occupation: Explorer
- Profession: Navy officer

Military service
- Allegiance: Spain
- Branch/service: Spanish Navy
- Rank: Captain

Juan de Sanabria (1504-1549) was a Spanish Nobleman, Captain and Conquistador.

== Biography ==
Sanabria was born in Trujillo, Cáceres, Extremadura, son of Diego Rodríguez de Sanabria and María de Alonso de Hinojosa, belonging to a distinguished family He was cousin of conquistador Hernán Cortés (Marquis of the Valley of Oaxaca).

In 1547, Sanabria was appointed as Adelantado of the Río de la Plata, he died while preparing trip to America. His son Diego de Sanabria, remained in charge of the expedition.

Juan de Sanabria was the husband of Mencía Calderón Ocampo, the first expeditionary woman of the New World, who arrived in Paraguayan territory six years after having left Spain. She was accompanied by his daughters, and a contingent of 80 soldiers, 40 Spanish women and some children.
