= Francisco Ortiz de Vergara =

Spanish conquistador

Governor of the Río de la Plata
- In office 1558–1569
- Preceded by: Gonzalo de Mendoza

Personal details
- Born: 1524; Seville
- Died: December 2, 1574; Ciudad Zaratina
- Profession: Conquistador; Colonizer

Francisco Ortiz de Vergara (1524 in Seville – 2 December 1574 in Ciudad Zaratina) was a Spanish conquistador and colonizer.

== Biography ==
He succeeded Gonzalo de Mendoza as governor of Rio de la Plata. He was elected, rather than appointed by the king or his predecessor. His election was confirmed by bishop Pedro de la Torre, but he was demoted by the Royal Audience and returned to Spain in 1565 following charges by Ñuflo de Chaves.

During his administration, there were a number of failed attempts at new settlements - Sancti Spiritus, San Francisco, and Santa Cruz de la Sierra. This last, in the southern Amazon Basin, was eventually successful, but only after the city had been moved over 200 kilometers from site chosen by Chaves. The former location is in the vicinity of San José de Chiquitos and is now an archaeological site under the name Santa Cruz la Vieja.

Preceded by Gonzalo de Mendoza	Acting Governor of Rio de la Plata; 1558-1565	Succeeded by Don Felipe de Cáceres
