= Juan de Ayolas =

Spanish conquistador and explorer

- Born: Briviesca, Crown of Castile
- Died: c. 1537
- Occupation: Conquistador

Juan de Ayolas (died c. 1537) was a conquistador born in Briviesca who explored the watershed of the Río de la Plata for the Spanish Crown. He accompanied Pedro de Mendoza on his 1534 expedition to colonize the region between the Río de la Plata and the Strait of Magellan and briefly succeeded him as the second governor of the region after Mendoza returned home in 1537.

Seeking supplies, he sailed up the Paraná River and founded a fort called Corpus Christi, as Sebastian Cabot had before him. Leaving Domingo Martínez de Irala at Puerto la Candelaria (modern Fuerte Olimpo), he sailed up the Paraguay River seeking a connection to Peru. He fought with the Guaraní, crossed the Chaco to the Andes, and seized some loot there, but when he returned, he was killed with every man of his company by the Payagua.

The city of Ayolas in Paraguay, and its airport (IATA: AYO; ICAO: SGAY) are named for him.

== See also ==
- Juan Abalos de Mendoza
- Gonzalo Casco
- Martín Suárez de Toledo
- Nicolás Colman
- Ulrich Schmidl

== Sources ==
- Britannica Online Encyclopedia
- Chisholm, Hugh, ed. (1911). "Argentina" . Encyclopædia Britannica. Vol. 2 (11th ed.). Cambridge University Press. p. 468.
- MAURA, Juan Francisco. Alvar Núñez Cabeza de Vaca: el gran burlador de América. Parnaseo/Lemir. Valencia: Universidad de Valencia, 2008.

Preceded by Pedro de Mendoza	Governor of New Andalusia; 1537	Succeeded by Domingo Martínez de Irala
