= Pedro de Mendoza =

Spanish conquistador (1499–1537)

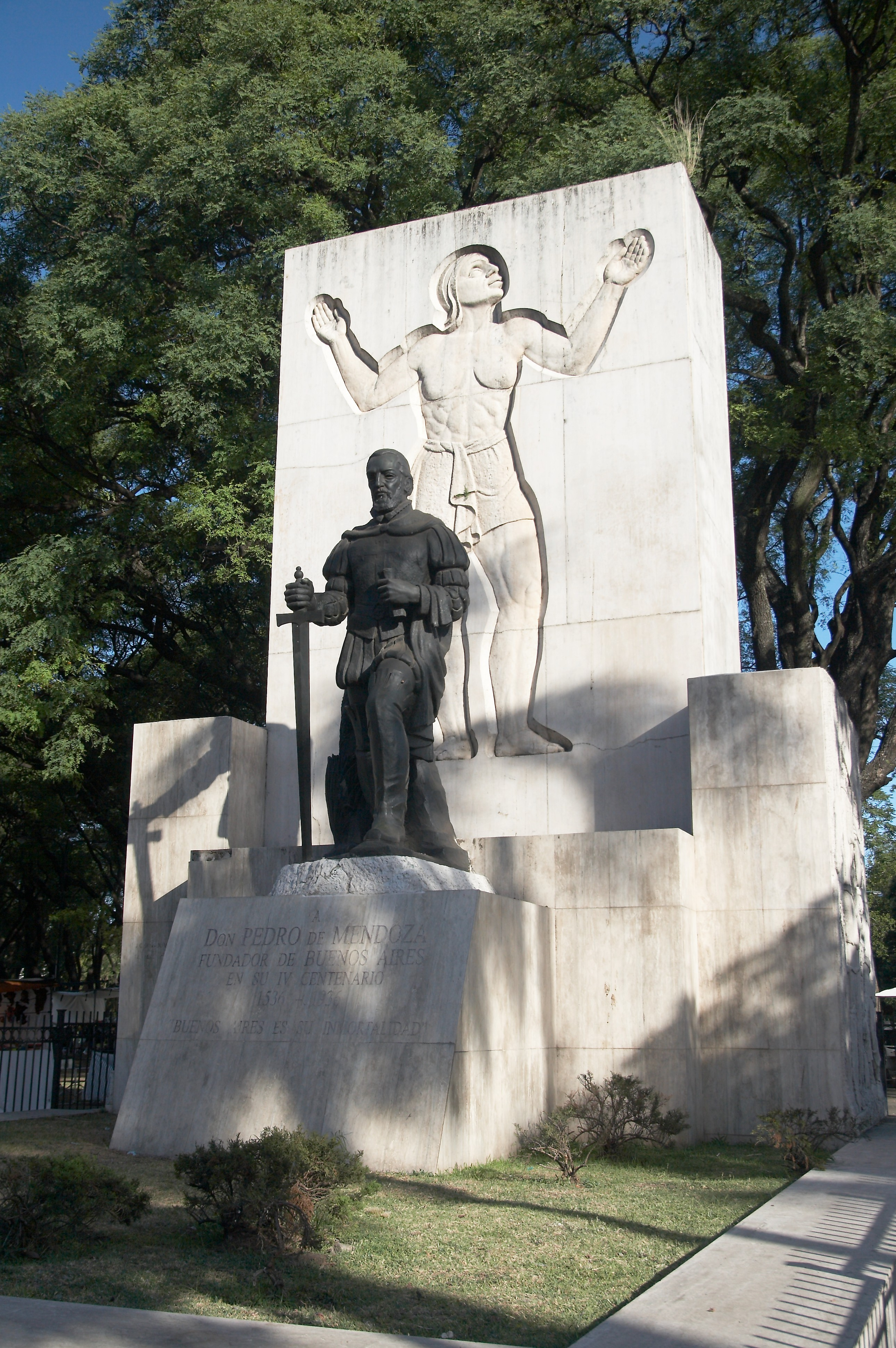
- Monument to Pedro de Mendoza, Parque Lezama, neighborhood of San Telmo, Buenos Aires, Argentina.
- Born: c. 1487; Guadix
- Died: 23 June 1537 (aged 49–50); Atlantic Ocean
- Occupation: Spanish conquistador

Pedro de Mendoza (Spanish pronunciation: [ˈpeðɾo ðe menˈdoθa]) (c. 1487 – 23 June 1537) was a Spanish conquistador, soldier and explorer, the first adelantado of New Andalusia, and the founder of Buenos Aires.

== Setting sail ==
Pedro de Mendoza was born in Guadix, Grenada, part of a large noble family that was preeminent in Spain. He was the son of Fernando de Mendoza of Guadix and Constanza de Luján. His father was the grandson of Íñigo López de Mendoza, 1st Marquis of Santillana.

His family settled in Guadix after its reconquest by the Christians in 1489. He was a page at the Spanish court of Emperor Charles V and accompanied the sovereign on his trip to England. In 1524 he received the title of knight of the Order of Alcántara and later, through the influence of his father — the knight Fernando de Mendoza Guadix — entered the Order of Santiago. He later fought in the Italian Wars against the French, in which he participated in the Sack of Rome in 1527.

In 1529, he offered to explore South America at his own expense and establish colonies. Thanks to the efforts of his relative María de Mendoza, wife of Secretary of State Francisco de los Cobos, in 1534 his offer was accepted: he was made adelantado governor, captain general, and chief justice over New Andalusia. This grant allowed him authority over as much land as he could conquer, within 200 leagues of the southern limit of New Toledo. Although this was measured along the Pacific coast, it was understood that his efforts would be directed towards the Río de la Plata on the Atlantic. The Emperor gave Mendoza 2000 men and 13 ships on the condition that within two years Mendoza should transport 1000 colonists, build roads into the interior, and construct three forts. He was to have half the treasure of the chiefs killed and nine-tenths of the ransom. The office of Governor was also, in theory, made hereditary.

That year, he set sail with a considerable fleet, but a terrible storm scattered it off the coast of Brazil. Here his lieutenant, Juan de Osorio, was assassinated, according to some authorities by the orders of Mendoza himself because of suspected disloyalty. Mendoza sailed up the Río de la Plata in 1535 and founded Buenos Aires on 2 February 1536.

Mendoza suffered from syphilis during the expedition and was frequently confined to bed. No notable campaigns occurred in the River Plate during this time, and the only chronicler was a German soldier named Ulderico Schmidt (or Ulrico Schmidl). Schmidt came over to the River Plate with Don Pedro and stayed there for eighteen years, fighting in almost every battle. His account of this early history of the River Plate region is the most important document from that time period.

== Battling the natives along the Río de la Plata ==
In the Río de la Plata region, the Spaniards encountered approximately 3,000 Querandíes, who initially provided food to them. But relations between the two groups later deteriorated, and the Querandíes moved further away from the settlement. Mendoza subsequently sent a force led by his brother against the Querandíes.

At the Battle of the Luján River, the natives were driven off after a bloody battle and their provisions were taken, but the fight was very costly to the Spaniards. Hundreds of natives were killed, but Mendoza's brother was slain as well, along with thirty of his men and several horses.

From "The Devastation of the Indies: A Brief Account" by Bartolomé de las Casas (a Spanish religious), written in 1542, published in 1552, under the subheadings "The Río de la Plata" wherein de las Casas writes of "A tyrannical Governor", the endnote #48 refers to this person as "a certain Pedro de Mendoza" and goes on to say,

"...ordered some of his men to go to a certain village for food...put to the sword more than 5,000 souls..." Further, another group of "Indians" "As they were killed, they cried out: 'We came in peace to serve you, and you kill us! Our blood spattered on these walls will remain as a witness to our unjust death and to your cruelty!'"

== Difficulties ==
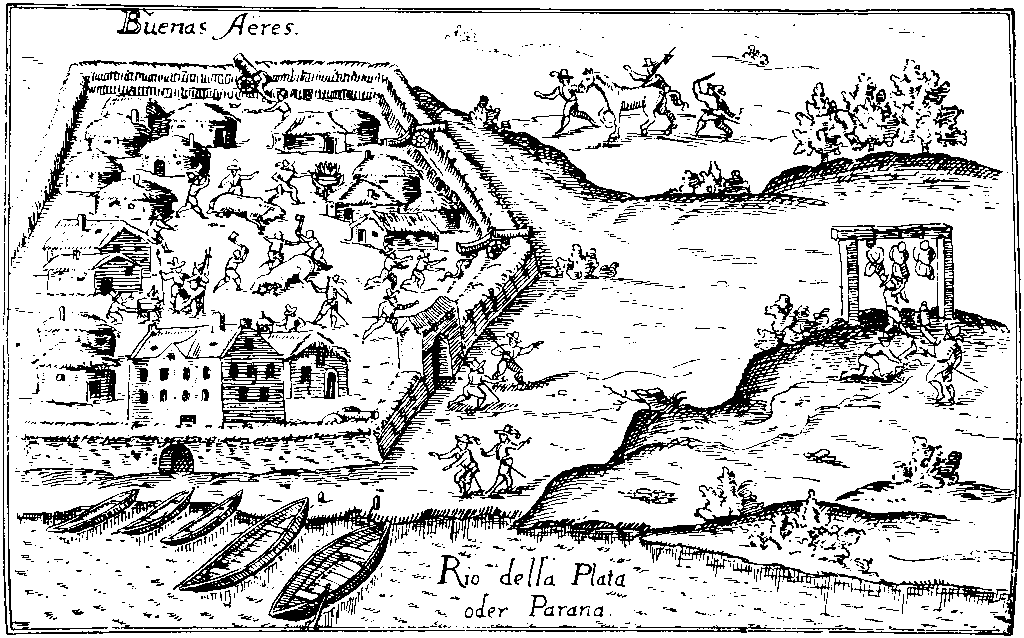
Buenos Aires shortly after its foundation by Pedro de Mendoza (drawing from the book of Ulrico Schmidl, a member of the expedition, 1536).

The colonists' city was surrounded by a hastily made 1 metre (3 ft) thick adobe wall made of mud. Every time it rained the wall partially dissolved. Along with this occasionally deteriorating wall, the colonists had to deal with another problem: famine. Food eventually became scarce, and the residents had to resort to eating rats, mice, snakes, lizards, rawhide boots, and even human remains.

In addition to these difficulties, a coalition of the natives formed. They attacked the city again and again, many times leaving the city almost completely burned to the ground. As his health deteriorated, Mendoza appointed Juan de Ayolas as captain-general.

Ayolas travelled up the Parana River with much of the remaining force. They defeated the Guaraní, and later reached an agreement with them. Ayolas then established Asunción, in current-day Paraguay, in 1537.

== Mendoza heads home ==
In 1537, Mendoza, whose health had deteriorated, embarked for Spain and died during the voyage. In his will, he requested that additional personnel and provisions be sent to the forces remaining in Buenos Aires, but the assistance provided was insufficient.

In 1541, the settlers abandoned Buenos Aires and moved to Asunción. Domingo Martínez de Irala was elected as the third (though temporary) governor by these men. With Buenos Aires in ruins, Asunción became the base for the reconquest of the Río de la Plata region.

New title Governorate created	Governor of New Andalusia; 1534–1537	Succeeded by Juan de Ayolas
