= Domingo Martínez de Irala =

Spanish conquistador (1509–1556)

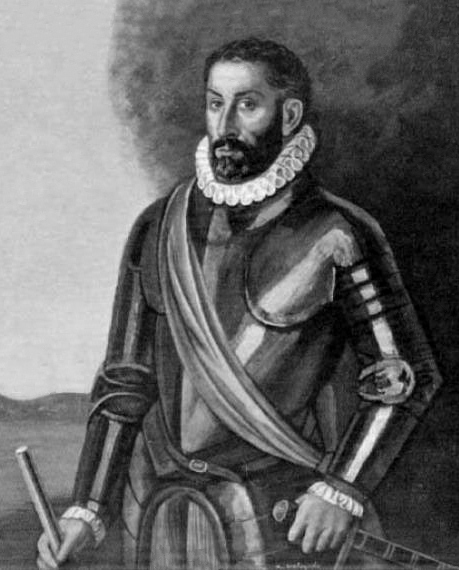
Domingo Martínez de Irala

Domingo Martínez de Irala (1509 – 3 October 1556) was a Spanish-Basque conquistador.

He headed for America in 1535 enrolled in the expedition of Pedro de Mendoza and participated in the founding of Buenos Aires. He explored the Paraná and Paraguay Rivers along with Juan de Ayolas and was commanding the rear-guard when Ayolas' advance party was wiped out by the Payagua Indians.

Unique in Spanish America, the colony had been granted by Charles V the right to elect its own commander under such circumstances; and in August 1538, de Irala was elected by the conquistadors as Captain General of the Río de la Plata.

In 1539, Irala began to move the inhabitants of Buenos Aires to Asunción, and the city was abandoned by 1541.

He outlasted Charles V's appointee, Álvar Núñez Cabeza de Vaca, whom he had recalled to Spain for trial as a traitor. Although Juan de Sanabria and his son Diego were appointed governor in 1547 and 1549, they never fulfilled their commissions, and de Irala was confirmed by the king as governor in 1552.

In 1555, he distributed land to approximately 320 colonists in Paraguay to govern as encomiendas that affected between 20,000 and 17,000 indigenous people. The institution of the first encomiendas provoked uprisings and rebellions.

He ruled forcefully until his death around 1556. During his rule, he had churches and public buildings erected, towns established, and the native population subjugated and distributed among the colonists in encomiendas. He was succeeded by Gonzalo de Mendoza.

Irala's relations with Guaraní women were central to the political and demographic history of the colony. Between 1537 and 1541, the giving of women to the conquistadors took place within the framework of the cuñadazgo, a Guaraní institution by which caciques sealed alliances by giving women to newcomers, transforming them into brothers-in-law or sons-in-law. From 1541 onwards, the abandonment of Buenos Aires and the concentration of colonization in Asunción overwhelmed this system and gave way to the rancheadas: mass and violent deportations of Guaraní women who were transformed into objects of buying and selling, used as common currency in commercial transactions and exported to the Portuguese port of São Vicente. Primary sources document Irala's personal involvement in this trade: a 1545 letter by Pero Hernández records that Irala sold a free Cario woman to Tristán de Vallartas "for a scarlet cloak and a velvet jacket" and sold an Agace man and woman "for a scarlet cloak and a quilt to a friar of the Order of Mercy." In his 1556 testament, Irala acknowledged nine children he had with seven different Guaraní women, whom he referred to as his criadas (servants). Modern historians argue that the mestizaje of Paraguay was "fundamentally a forced sexual relationship," with indigenous women exploited both sexually and economically.

== See also ==
- History of Paraguay
- India Juliana
- Indigenous women in the conquest of Paraguay

== Sources ==
- Maura, Juan Francisco (2008) Alvar Núñez Cabeza de Vaca: El gran burlador de América Publicaciones de Parnaseo, Universidad de Valencia, Valencia, Spain, in Spanish
- Infoplease
- Chisholm, Hugh, ed. (1911). "Argentina" . Encyclopædia Britannica. Vol. 2 (11th ed.). Cambridge University Press. p. 468.

Preceded by Juan de Ayolas	Acting Governor of New Andalusia; 1537–1540	Succeeded by Álvar Núñez Cabeza de Vaca
Preceded by Álvar Núñez Cabeza de Vaca	Acting Governor of New Andalusia; 1544–1552	Succeeded by Himself
Preceded by Himself	Governor of Rio de la Plata; 1552–1556	Succeeded by Gonzalo de Mendoza
