= Military history of South America =

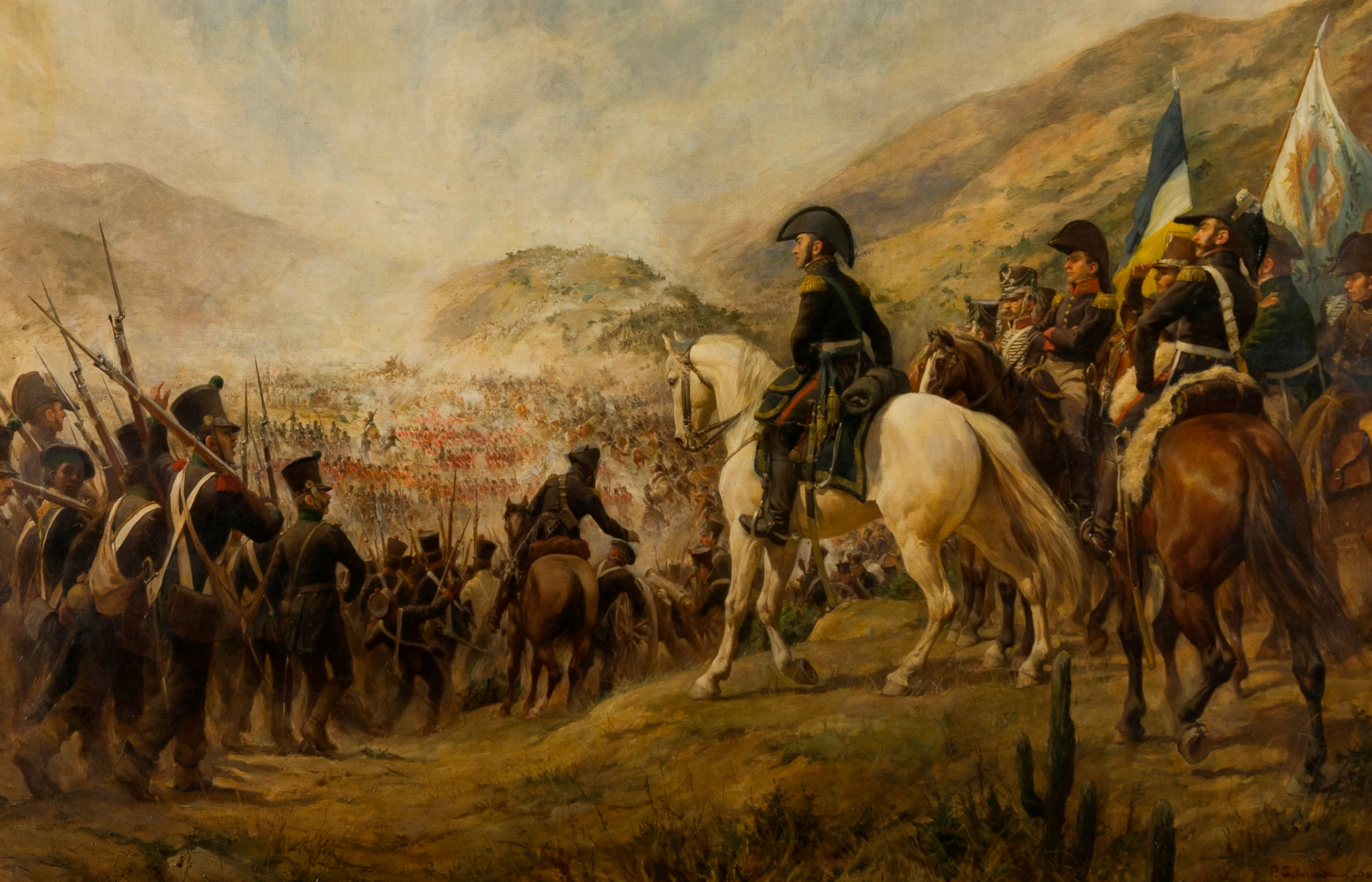
The Battle of Chacabuco, 1817, during the Chilean War of Independence, a war often fought across harsh and difficult terrain.

The military history of South America can be divided into two major periods – pre- and post-Columbian – divided by the entrance of European forces to the region. The sudden introduction of steel, gunpowder weapons and horses into the Americas would revolutionize warfare. Within the post-Columbian period, the events of the early 19th century, when almost all of South America was marked by wars of independence, also forms a natural historical juncture. Throughout its history, South America has had distinct military features: it has been geographically separated from many major military powers by large oceans; its unique terrain has imposed major logistical challenges, and privileged naval lines of communications.

Since the 1940s, the region has avoided wars between its states; see South American Long Peace.

== Early military history ==
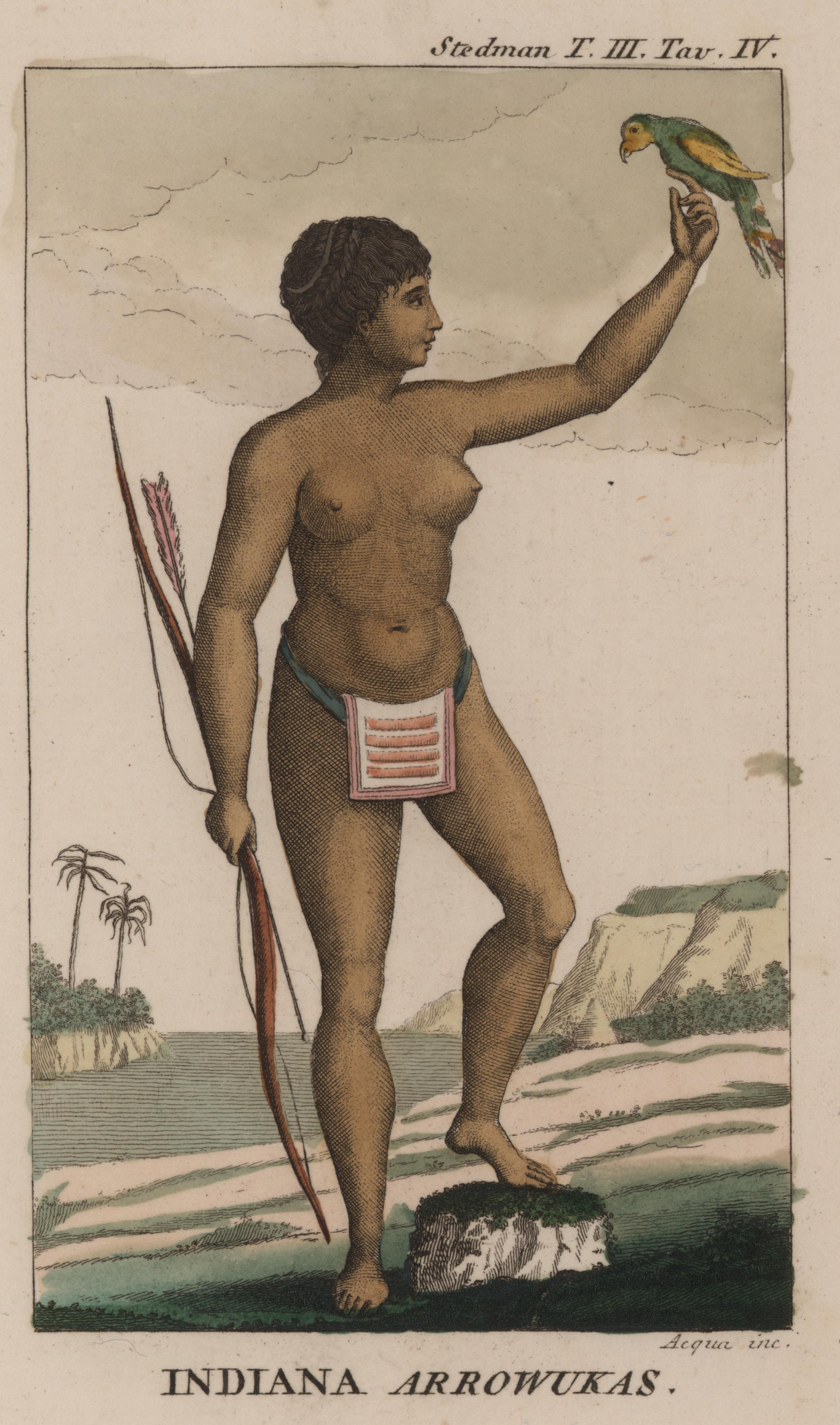
Arawak woman (John Gabriel Stedman)

Early South American military history is distinctively different from that in Asia or Europe. Metallurgy influenced warfare in the Americas less than in other parts of the world; in South America the use of stone, wood and bone, backed by limited use of copper, dominated weaponry up until the European invasions. The extinction of horses early on in the human habitation of the Americas meant that early South Americans had no cavalry – five thousand years of using horses in warfare had no parallel on the continent. In naval warfare, early South Americans did not build ships on a size comparable with those on other continents. Politically, state formation also came relatively late to South America, affecting the ability of South America to generate large armies early on in its history.

=== Caribbean coast, Amazonia and the south ===
The northern edge of the continent saw army events dominated by a struggle between two ethnic groups. The first, the Arawak, lived along the eastern coast of South America, as far south as what is now Brazil, and up into Guyana. When first encountered by Christopher Columbus, the Arawak were described as a peaceful people, although the Arawak had already dominated other local groups such as the Ciboney. The Arawak had, however, come under increasing army pressure from the Caribs, who are believed to have left the Orinoco River area in South America to settle in the Caribbean. Over the century leading up to Columbus' arrival in the Caribbean archipelago in 1492, the Caribs are believed to have displaced many of the Arawaks who previously settled the island chains, and making inroads into what would now be modern Guyana. The Caribs were skilled boatbuilders and sailors, and owed their dominance in the Caribbean basin to their military skills. Cannibalism formed a key part of the Caribs' war rituals: the limbs of victims may have been taken home as trophies.

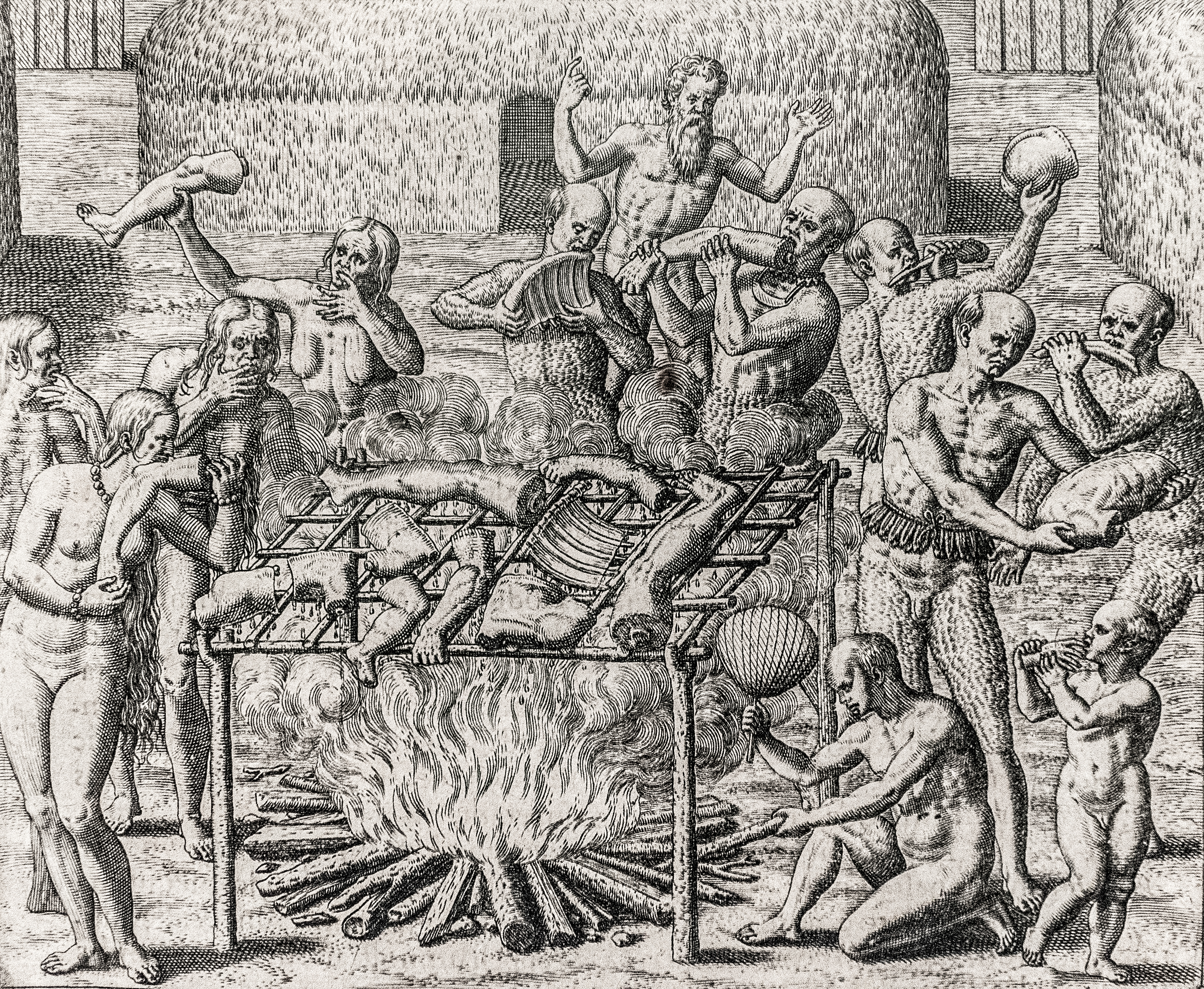
Military rituals in Brazil as described by Hans Staden.

The territory of current-day Brazil had as many as 2,000 tribes prior to European discovery, mostly semi-nomadic peoples who subsisted on hunting, fishing, gathering, and migrant agriculture. One such tribe were the Tupi, who had expanded to inhabit almost all of Brazil's coast, reaching an estimated population of 1 million people by 1500 AD. The Tupi often fought against the other tribes of the region and among themselves, aiming to capture their enemies to later kill them – as amongst the Caribs, cannibalism was a key part of the Tupi rituals after a war. Further south, across the regions of modern-day Paraguay, Argentina and Uruguay, early South American warfare appears to have been sporadic and decentralised – although the historical sources prior to contact with European invaders is limited. The Minuane were one of the indigenous tribes of Uruguay, related to the other tribes in the area like Charrúa and Guenoa, living across the area today known as Uruguay, northeastern Argentina and southern Brazil. They were a nomadic people that sustained themselves through fishing and foraging. Another Paraguayan tribe, the Guaraní people, also had a nomadic, decentralized society; they tended to form tribal groups by dialect, and like the Minuane, were not known as a war-like people – although the Charrúa people are believed to have killed Spanish explorer Juan Díaz de Solís during his 1515 voyage up the Río de la Plata

=== Pacific Rim ===
By contrast, the mountainous Pacific Rim of South America saw the evolution of a sequence of empires deploying well organised military forces. Early cultures in the central Andes seem to have been less centralised and far less militaristic. The Chavín culture, for example, which dominated the Moche Valley region in modern-day Peru from 900 BC to 300 BC, has left no archaeological trace of warfare. The Moche, however, formed a complex state along the northern coast of Peru from 100 BC – 700 AD, which included warfare. The mummified remains of a Moche woman found in 2005 were accompanied by various military and ornamental artifacts, including war clubs and spear throwers, hinting at the military technology of the Moche. Towards the end of the Moche, later settlements have fortifications and defensive works, but there is no evidence of a foreign invasion, for example by the Wari empire, as many scholars have suggested in the past. There is however some evidence of social unrest, possibly the result of climatic changes as factions fought for control over scarce resources.

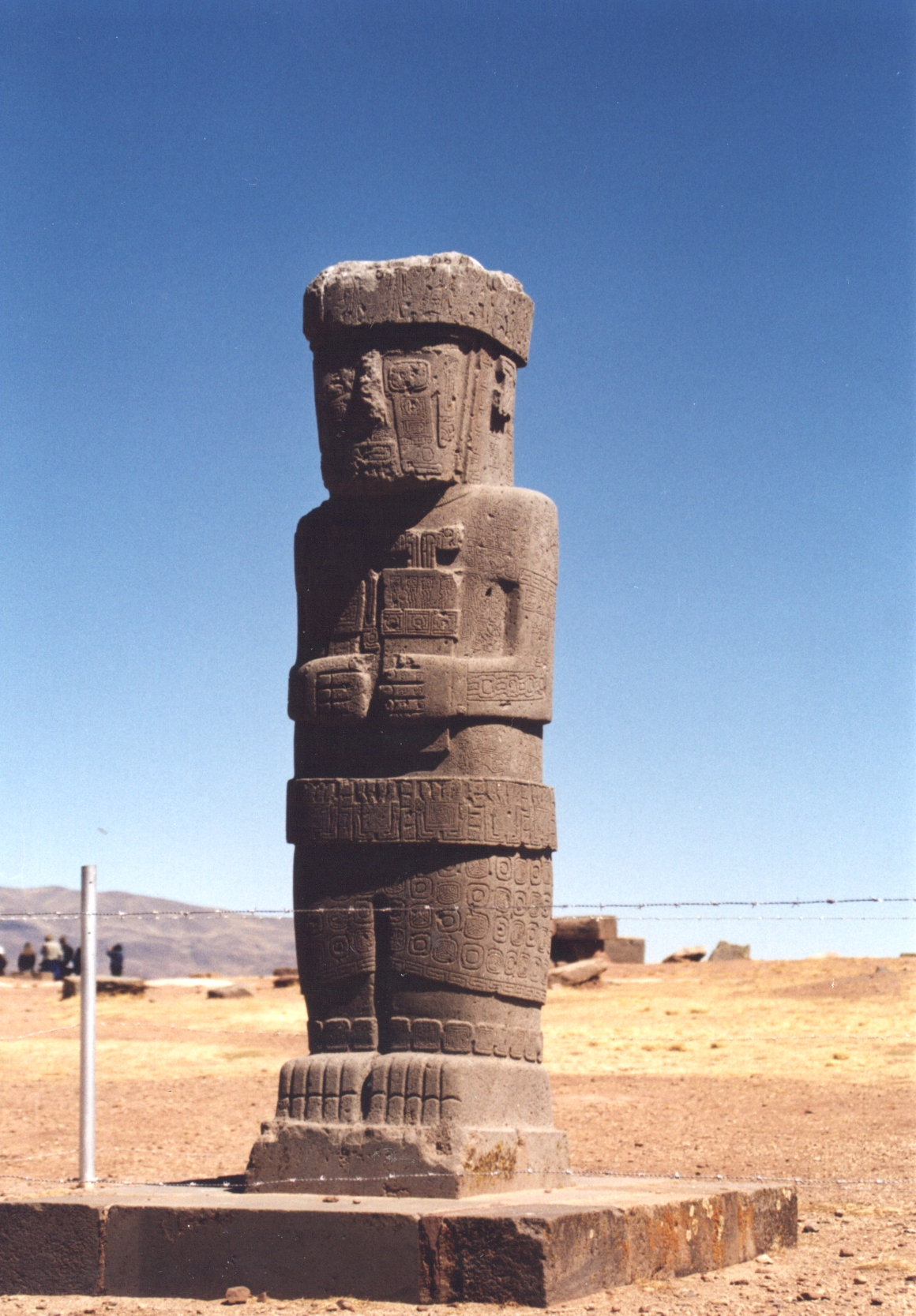
Tiwanaku statue, a symbol of their regional power.

As the Moche declined, the Wari civilisation was growing in power, lasting from 600 – 1200 AD. The capital city of Wari was located north-east of the modern city of Ayacucho, Peru. From there, the Wari expanded to control much of the highlands and coast of modern Peru. Early on, their territory expanded to include the ancient oracle center of Pachacamac, though it seems to have remained largely autonomous. Later it expanded to include much of the territory of the earlier Moche and later Chimu cultures.

The Chimú themselves had originated in the coastal areas once dominated by the Moche, centering on the Moche Valley, south of modern-day Lima. By 900 AD, a sequence of Chimú rulers had conquered the surrounding valleys, with the final Chimú Kingdom being founded somewhere in the first half of the 14th century AD, followed by a great military expansion across the region. At their peak, the Chimú advanced to the limits of the desert coast, to the Jequetepeque valley in the north, and Carabayllo in the south. Their expansion southward was stopped by the military power of the great valley of Lima, and the kingdom would survive up until the time of the Inca invasions.

Meanwhile, to the south, Tiwanaku had emerged as a well-organised, centralised military power for much of 400 AD – 1000 AD, taking forward military evolution in the Andean region. Tiwanaku, west of La Paz flourished as the capital for approximately five hundred years. Around 400 AD, Tiwanaku expanded militarily, moving into the Yungas and bringing its culture to many other cultures in modern-day Peru, Bolivia, and Chile. Tiwanaku grew by combining military expansion with colonies, trade agreements and the establishment of religious cult. Tiwanaku's power continued to grow until about 950 AD when a dramatic shift in climate occurred. As the rains reduced, many of the furthest cities began to produce fewer crops to give to the elites. As the surplus of food dropped, the elite's power began to fail – by 1000 AD, Tiwanaku had disappeared. The land was not inhabited again for many years, but the Tiwanaku approach to empire and military expansion was to be critical as a precursor of the Inca empire.

Further north along the Andes, into modern-day Ecuador, later cultures included the Quitus, who formed the city of Quito in the first millennium. The Quitu were ultimately conquered by the Caras tribe, who founded the Kingdom of Quito about 980 AD. Under their kings, the shyris, the Caras formed a powerful military state that would survive and dominate the Ecuadorian highlands up until the Inca period.

== Inca conquests ==
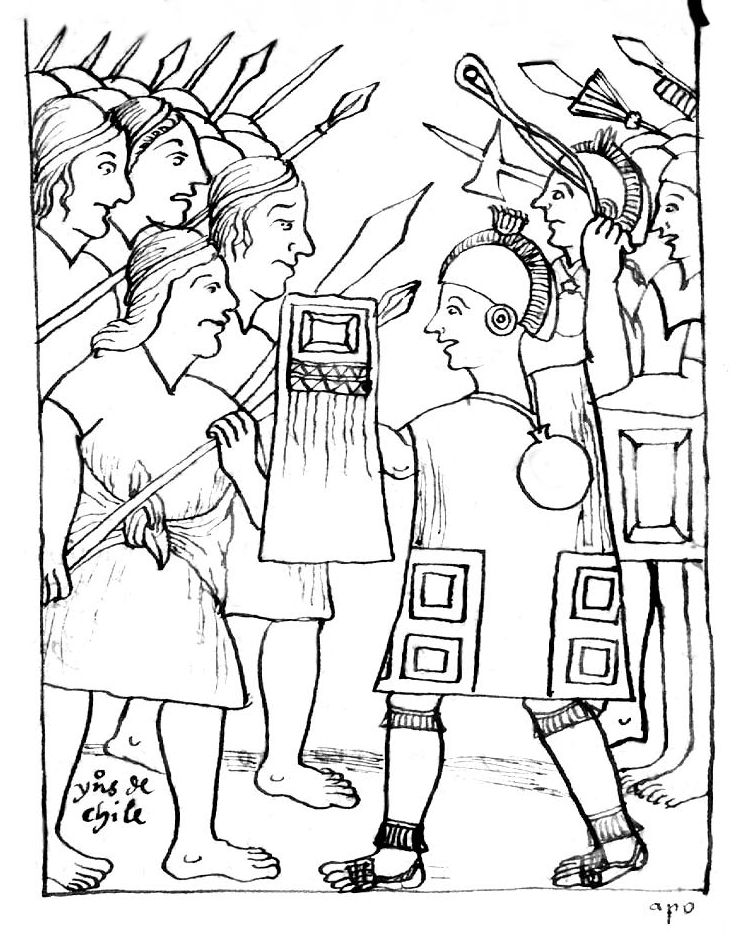
Huamán Poma de Ayala's picture showing the confrontation between the Mapuches (left) and the Incas (right)

The Inca Empire was the largest empire in pre-Columbian America. The Inca Empire arose from the highlands of Peru sometime in the early 13th century; from 1438 to 1533, the Incas used a variety of methods, from conquest to peaceful assimilation, to incorporate a large portion of western South America, centered on the Andean mountain ranges, including large parts of modern Ecuador, Peru, western and south central Bolivia, northwest Argentina, north and north-central Chile, and southern Colombia. The Inca approach to warfare was well organised and disciplined, building on the Andean military societies before it. It represented a major step forward in military organisation in South America.

=== Rise of the Inca ===
The Incan empire expanded into what later became Ecuador during the reign of Pachacuti Inca Yupanqui, who began the northward conquest in 1463. He gave his son Topa control of the army, and Topa conquered the kingdom of the Quitu and continued coastward. Topa may have undertaken a sea voyage across the Pacific Ocean. Upon his alleged return from this voyage, he was unable to subdue the people of Puná Island and the Guayas coast. His son Huayna Capac, however, was able to subsequently conquer these peoples, including the Cañaris who put up resistance for many years, consolidating Ecuador into the Inca Empire. In the south, the Mapuche successfully resisted many attempts by the Inca Empire to subjugate them, despite their lack of state organization. They fought against Sapa Inca and Tupac Yupanqui and their respective armies. The result of the bloody three-day confrontation known as the Battle of the Maule was that the Incan conquest of the territories of Chile ended at the Maule River. They fell back to the north behind the Rapel and Cachapoal Rivers where they established a fortified border guarded by fortresses like Pucará de La Compañía and the Pucará del Cerro La Muralla.

The Incas developed an integrated form of warfare; spies would be sent into regions prior to an invasion; attempts would be made to bribe local leaders and to marry local elites into the Inca families. Where conquest by force had occurred, the Incan empire would uproot groups of Quechua-speakers from the Inca heartlands, called mitimaes, who were loyal to the empire and resettle them in the disputed regions.

=== Inca warfare ===
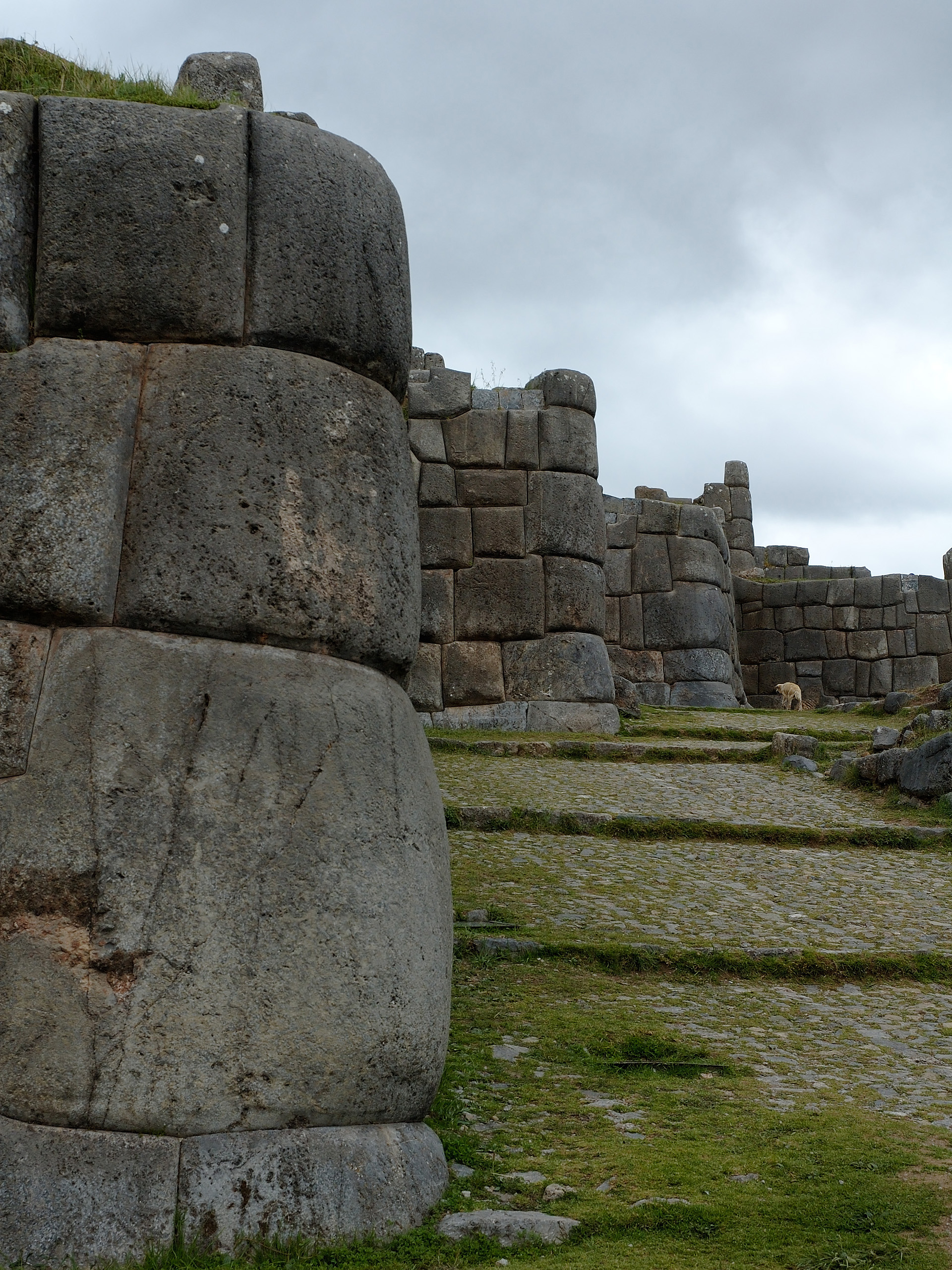
Sacsayhuamán, the Inca stronghold of Cusco

The Inca army was the most powerful on the continent during the period. Although enjoying a similar level of technology to their enemies, they excelled at mobilizing their available manpower and creating well disciplined forces. In contrast to the Aztecs, who waged war mainly to take prisoners for human sacrifice and who took tribute rather than land from the defeated people, the Incas' goals of war were to kill enemy soldiers and directly conquer enemy lands, putting them under the rule of the Sapa Inca, who was the highest head of the army. By the time the Inca empire had reached its full size, every section of the empire contributed in setting up an army for war. The Incas could field armies of 100,000 at a time, and were well organized in military logistics, using magazines owned by the state to supply mass contingents with food, and also white tents in camp, organized in symmetric patterns. Roads allowed very quick movement for the Inca army, and shelters called quolla were built one day's distance in travel from each other, so that an army on campaign could be fed and rested. Inca officers, often drawn from the Sapa Inca's own household, added to the overall sense of discipline.

The traditional mode of battle in the Andes was a form of siege warfare where large numbers of usually reluctant draftees were sent to overwhelm opponents. They went into battle with the beating of drums and the blowing of trumpets. Inca fortifications were massive, with carefully fitted stones forming huge fortifications, as at Cusco. Inca soldier would wear tunics, often with checkered patterns, and protected themselves with helmets made of wood, copper, bronze, cane, or animal skin; some were adorned with feathers. Shields made from wood or hide would be carried, with some soldiers also adding quilt cotton padding or small wooden planks to their tunics for additional protection. Inca armies carried multiple weapons, including heavy slings, bolas, two-handed wooden swords with serrated edges, bronze or bone-tipped spears, clubs, stone or copper headed battle-axes, bronze knives and scythes: polearms, each affixed with a large, curving blade, used for slashing at enemies from a distance.

=== Inca Civil War ===
The Inca Civil War broke out after the death in 1527 of the Sapa Inca Huayna Capac to smallpox, which he had caught whilst investigating the rumours of the European in the north. His eldest son and heir, Ninan Cuyochi, died shortly after him. With both the leading Inca and the successor to the throne dead, there was unrest as to who would become the next Inca king. No clear rules stated how one was to gain succession to the throne, with two brothers Huáscar and Atahualpa claiming primacy. From 1531 to 1532, the two brothers' armies participated in numerous battles. Atahualpa was victorious at Mochacaxa, Pincos and Andaguayias and then marched south into his brother's territories, killing those, including many of the Cañari tribesmen who had sided with Huáscar. Approaching Cajamarca, Atahualpa sent the majority of his army ahead to continue the advance while he stayed in the city to explore the rumors that the Spaniards had arrived in the empire. There, good news reached Atahualpa – Huáscar had sent another army to meet Atahualpa's, but his forces had been routed and Huáscar himself had been taken prisoner, bringing an end to the civil war.

== European invasion ==
The European invasions of South America in the 16th and 17th centuries, principally by the Spanish and Portuguese, were to have a dramatic impact. The military conquests destroyed the Inca state; the consequent epidemics and social chaos reduced this and other indigenous societies by up to 93%. Few other military events have had as long lasting consequences for a region.

=== Spanish conquests ===
==== Initial conquest of the Inca Empire ====
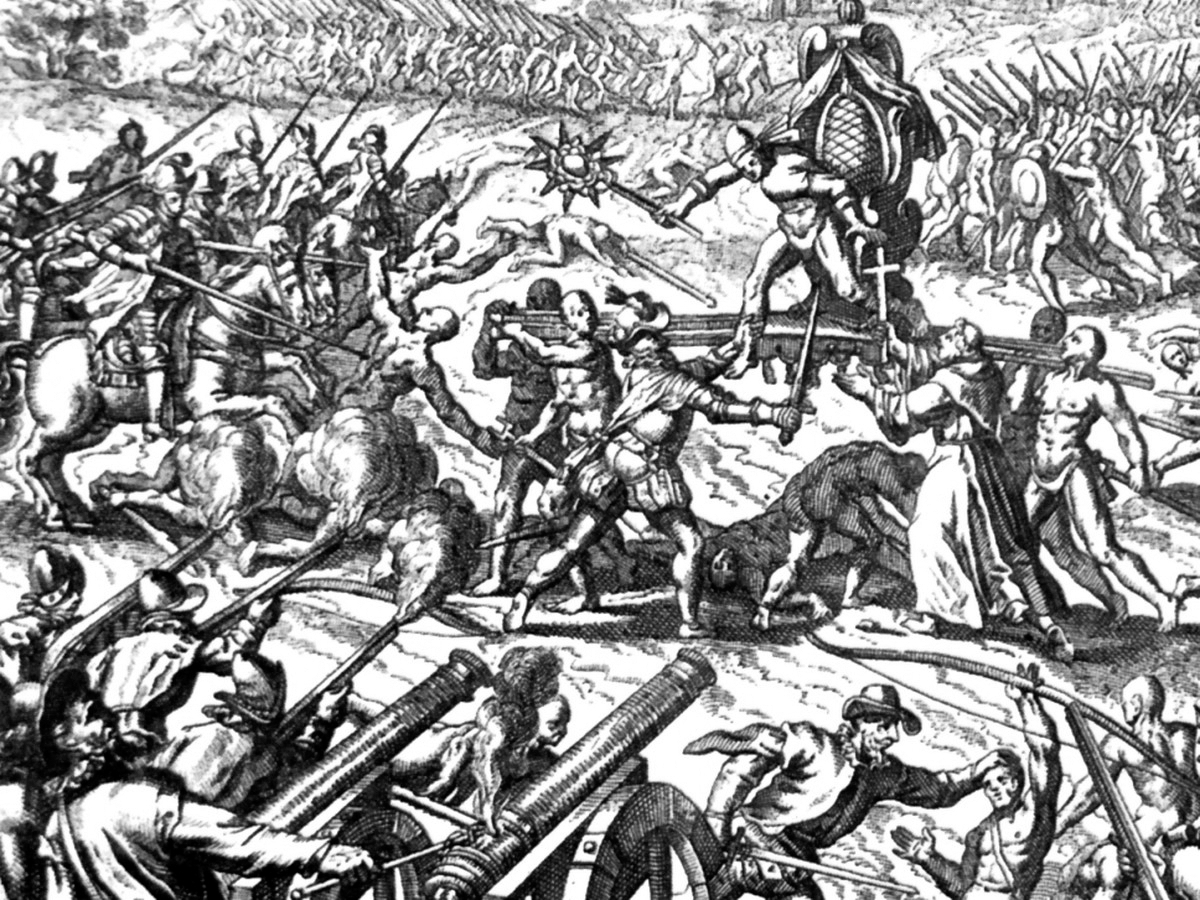
The battle of Cajamarca, 16 November 1532.

The Spanish conquistadors who would conquer the Incas, Francisco Pizarro and his brothers Gonzalo and Hernando, were attracted by the prospects of wealth and power. Pizarro made several early attempts to invade Peru from his main base in Panama; the first, leaving in 1524, met with setbacks in the battle of Punta Quemada against the natives of Colombia, and was forced to retreat. The second reached Atacames on the Ecuadorian coast, before encountering recently subdued tribes under the rule of the Incas, resulting in another withdrawal. Pizarro however pushed on, exploring the Tumbes region of northern Peru and hearing the first reports of the wealth of the Inca emperor. Unable to get local Spanish support for another expedition, Pizarro returned to Spain where he convinced the King to mount another full-scale expedition. When Pizarro returned to Peru in 1532 with 168 men under his command, he found it vastly different from when he had been there just five years before, the consequence of the intervening civil war and the disease that was now destroying the Inca Empire.

Arranging a sequence of discussions with Emperor Atahualpa, Pizarro laid a trap for the Inca leader. When Atahualpa arrived in Cajamara in November, accompanied by 7,000 unarmed soldiers and attendants, the Spanish made a surprise attack, initiating the battle of Cajamarca. The shocked Incas offered such feeble resistance that the battle has often been labeled a massacre with the Inca losing 2,000 dead compared to five of Pizarro's men. Contemporary accounts by members of Pizarro's force explain how the Spanish forces used a cavalry charge against the Inca forces, in combination with gunfire from cover – both military technologies were new to the Inca. Other factors in the Spaniard's favor were their steel swords, helmets and armour. The Spanish also had three small cannon which were used to great effect against the crowded town square. Taking the Inca emperor prisoner, the Spanish invaders demanded a huge sum of precious gems and metals to be exchanged for Atahualpa. By May, 1533 Pizarro received all the treasure he had requested; it was melted, refined, and made into bars. Atahualpa was executed by the Spanish in August 1533.

==== The Spanish consolidation and civil wars ====
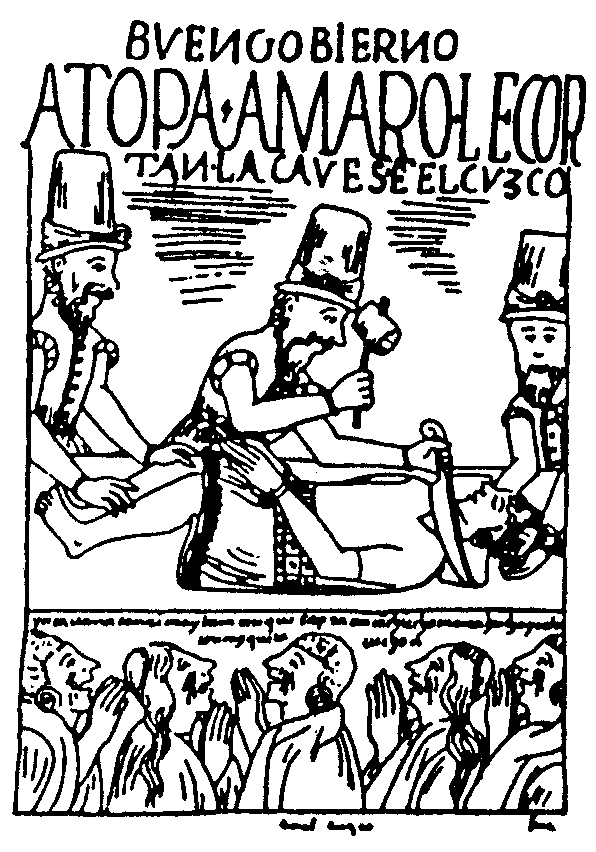
Spaniards executing Tupac Amaru, the last Inca of Vilcabamba, in 1572

After Atahualpa's execution, Pizarro installed Atahualpa's brother, Túpac Huallpa, as a puppet Inca ruler. Pizarro's lieutenant, Benalcázar, travelled north with 140 foot soldiers and a few horses to conquer modern-day Ecuador, where he defeated the forces of the Inca general Rumiñahui with the aid of Cañari tribesmen. Túpac Huallpa then died unexpectedly, leaving Manco Inca Yupanqui in power. He began his rule as an ally of the Spanish and was respected in the southern regions of the empire, but there was still much unrest in the north near Quito where the remaining Inca generals were amassing troops. The Inca armies inflicted considerable damage before the Spanish succeeded in recapturing Quito, effectively ending any organized rebellion in the north of the empire. After being mistreated, Manco Inca rebelled, escaping Spanish custody and attempted to retake Cusco in 1537. The Inca leadership did not, however, have the full support of its subject peoples and Manco was eventually forced to retreat, first to the fortress of Ollantaytambo, and then further into the mountainous region of Vilcabamba, where he established the small Neo-Inca State holding onto some power for several more decades. His son, Túpac Amaru, was the last Inca, and was finally killed by the Spanish in 1572. In total, the conquest took about forty years to complete.

Alongside the Spanish campaign to occupy Peru, a civil war broke out between Francisco Pizarro and Diego de Almagro over prerogatives and rights over the conquered cities, in which Almagro was ultimately killed. Almagro's faction, the Almagristas, later avenged his death by killing Pizarro, but were finally defeated in the battle of Chupas in 1542, and their new leader, Diego Almagro El Mozo, executed. Conflict broke out again, however, two years later when controversial New Laws were introduced by Peru's first viceroy. Gonzalo Pizarro organized a conquistador army to challenge the viceroy. The rebel army was victorious in 1546 at Añaquito near Quito but over the following months the support for Gonzalo diminished when the royal authorities offered pardon and a repealing of the New Laws. Most of Gonzalo's army deserted him just before the battle at Sacsayhuamán near Cuzco; Gonzalo surrendered and was beheaded.

==== The Spanish conquest of Chile ====
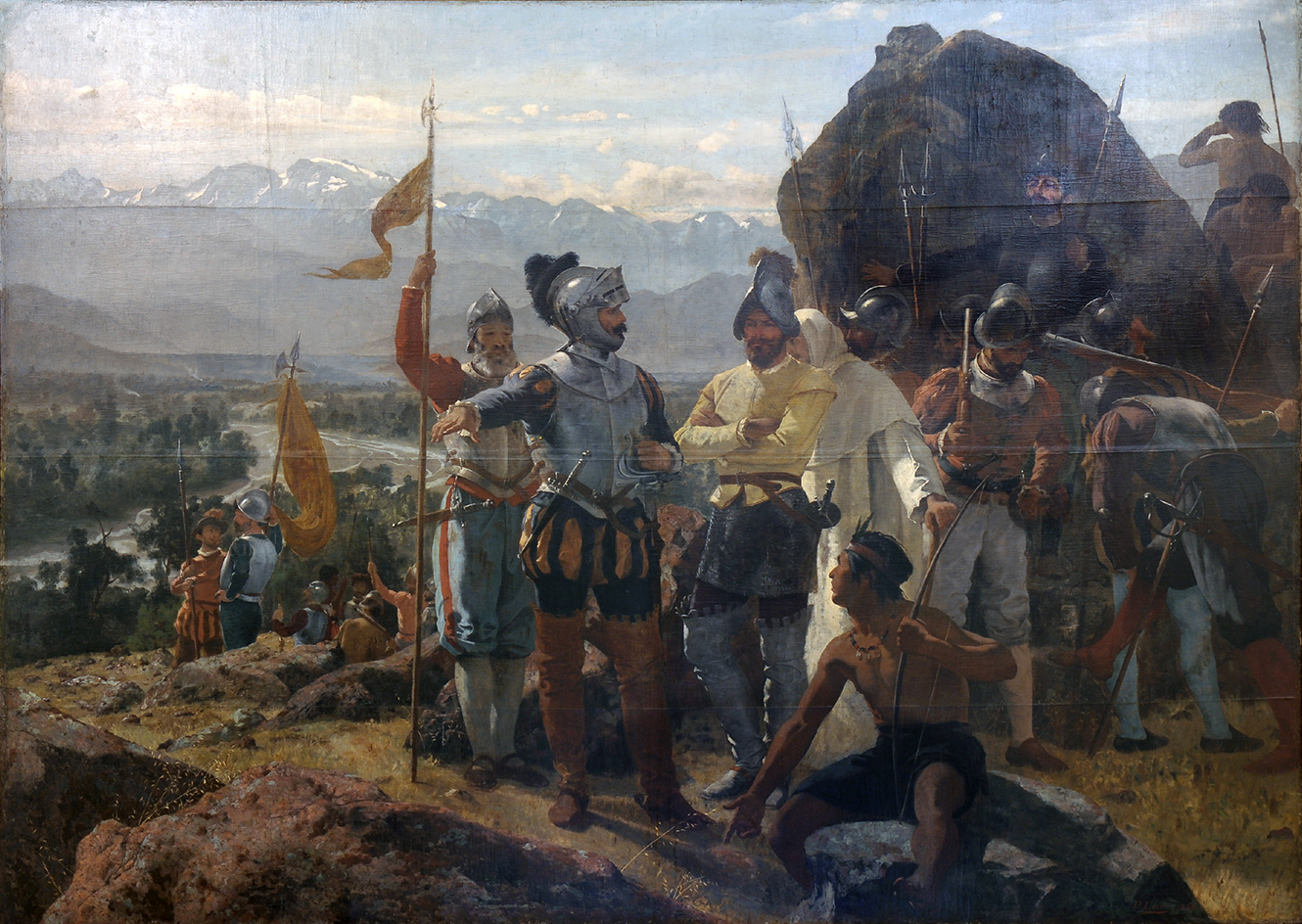
Pedro Lira's 1889 painting of the founding of Santiago by Pedro de Valdivia at Huelén Hill

The first Spanish attempt to conquer Chile under Diego de Almagro in 1536 resulted in failure as his forces marched over the Andes, but the potential for new lands remained an important driver for some of the Spanish leaders now ruling Peru. The second Spanish invasion of Chile was led by Pedro de Valdivia, who had first arrived in South America in 1534, and had served under Francisco Pizarro in Peru. In 1540 he led an expedition of 150 Spaniards and around a thousand native Indians into Chile. Raising this force had been challenging, as Spanish soldiers and equipment were in very short supply in South America and many suspected that Chile would turn out to be a poorer country than Peru. The Spanish marched through the Atacama Desert, avoiding the mountains and successfully fighting their way through to the Copiapó valley. By the end of the year, Valdivia reached the valley of the Mapocho River, establishing the capital of his new territory, Santiago.

The region was already held by the warlike Mapuche and the Picunche peoples. Valdivia pushed southward and divided the land and the local inhabitants among his followers, putting the natives to work in the mines. Local Indian resistance led by Michimalonco began to emerge, but the natives were crushed at the battle of Cachapoal and, in 1541, at the siege of Santiago – although the city was badly damaged. Valdivia soon began rebuilding Santiago and conquering the northern region of Chile, including the Atacama Desert. In 1546 Valdivia set out to conquer the south with sixty horsemen and crossed the Itata River, finally reaching the Biobío River where he was attacked by Mapuche warriors at the battle of Quilacura and was forced to retreat. Valdivia invaded southern Chile again, but faced heavy resistance from the indigenous population. Valdivia pressed on, defeating the Mapuche at the battle of Penco and founding Concepción in 1550. The Spanish occupiers then faced a number of great rebellions across the extreme south of their new territories, marking the beginning of a long-running war that would last three centuries.

==== Spanish-Mapuche wars ====
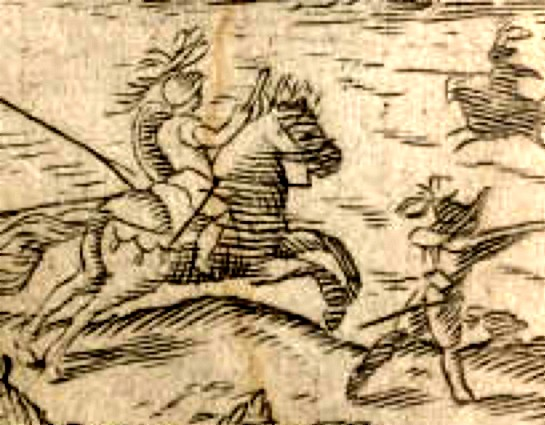
Spanish depiction of the war against the Mapuche

The first great Mapuche rebellion occurred in 1553, under the leadership of generals Caupolicán and Lautaro. It initially met with success, killing Valdivia at the battle of Tucapel. Lautaro found it difficult to turn these early victories into a strategic gain, however; his forces moved slowly, hampered by epidemics and internal divisions. Francisco de Villagra, the new Spanish general, killed Lautaro in 1557, whilst Caupolicán was defeated in a sequence of battles at Lagunillas and Millarapue. Finally captured, Caupolicán was painfully executed by the Spanish, bringing the rebellion to a close.

The pause was short lived. Illangulién was elected as successor to Caupolicán, and under his leadership the Mapuche learned to work iron, use Spanish weapons, including firearms and cannon, ride horses captured from their conquerors and acquired better strategies and tactics. In 1561, the second great revolt began against Spanish rule led by various Mapuche generals including Loble and Millalelmo. Attacking isolated and underdefended Spanish settlements and forts, the Mapuche contained the Spanish field army around the rebuilt city of Concepción, resulting in the siege of Concepción in 1564. The logistical challenges of maintaining a large army in the field resulted in the Mapuche finally lifting the siege. Meanwhile, the Spanish killed Illangulién at the battle of Angol. Pedro de Villagra, who had taken command of the Spanish forces, then regrouped his forces and began a fresh campaign against the Mapuche. In 1565, Pedro de Villagra defeated the Mapuche at the second battle of Reinohuelén, following this up by ambushing and killing Loble, effectively ending the second great revolt.

The region remained unstable, however, and in 1592 Martín García Óñez de Loyola was appointed to finish the war, taking an army from Panama deep into Mapuche territory. The invasion turned into disaster, when Loyola was surprised at the Curalaba and killed. This marked the beginning of another great Mapuche uprising that resulted in a six-year struggle called the 'Destruction of Seven Cities' that eliminated almost all the Spanish settlements south of the Biobío River. The Spanish sent in Alonso de Ribera to stabilise the situation; he created a permanent army of 1,500 men, paid from royal revenues in Peru. The Spanish came to rely on a series of forts along the frontier, backed by a concentrated mobile force behind it. In the early 17th century, this defensive stance was criticised, leading to a resumption of offensive Spanish actions, until Francisco López de Zúñiga held the Parliament of Quillin, with the toqui Lincopinchon and established the first formal peace with Mapuche people. Smaller uprisings and skirmishes would continue, however, until the 19th century.

=== Portuguese conquests ===
The Portuguese first landed in Brazil in 1500, as part of a journey following Vasco da Gama's way to India, around Africa. Subsequent Portuguese expeditions focused on Africa and India, rather than South America, relying on passing trade with the peoples of Brazil, enabled by explorers such as João Ramalho, who lived among the Guaianaz tribe near today's São Paulo, and Diogo Álvares Correia, nicknamed Caramuru, who lived among the Tupinamba natives near today's Salvador de Bahia. Concerned by reports that France might also be sending expeditions to Brazil, the Portuguese crown decided to send a large expedition to take full possession of the land and combat the French. In 1530, an expedition led by Martim Afonso de Sousa arrived to block the French from the coast and create the first colonial villages, such São Vicente.

The high cost of military occupation encouraged the Portuguese crown to find new ways to pay for the costs of colonialisation. Between 1534 and 1536 King John III divided the land into 15 Captaincies of Brazil, which were given to Portuguese noblemen who were granted considerable powers to administer, explore and profit from them. The captaincies faced strong opposition from the local tribes, and following widespread failure and the French threat along the Brazilian coast, King John III decided to revert Brazil to a royal enterprise. In 1549, a large fleet set sail to Brazil to establish a central government in the colony; Tomé de Sousa, the first Governor-General of Brazil, brought detailed instructions, prepared by the King's aides, about how to develop of the colony, including building up its military defences. The first three Governor-Generals all faced strong armed opposition from the local tribes and ongoing problems with the French – by 1573, however, the Portuguese were militarily well established all along the Brazilian coast

=== Dutch, English and French conquests ===
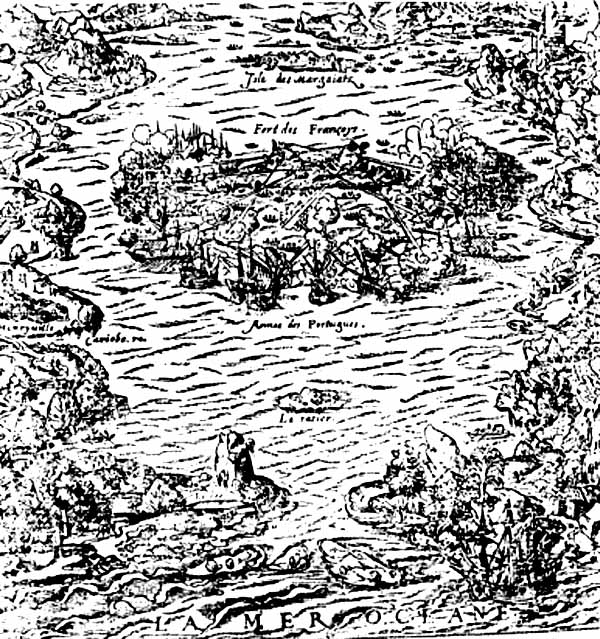
France Antarctique under Portuguese attack (1560)

The remaining European nations had to content themselves with seizing relatively small territories, usually based on isolated forts or islands along the coast. The Dutch, working through the Dutch West India Company built fortified plantations in modern-day Guyana, displacing the local Caribs, but found themselves in fierce competition with the neighbouring English plantations. Eventually European land swapping would result in the creation of Dutch Guiana and British Guyana. French Guiana was settled by the French in 1604, although its earliest settlements were abandoned in the face of hostility from the local tribes and tropical diseases; even two hundred years later, the French sheltered along the coast on the islands called the Iles de Salut or the "Islands of Salvation".

Further south, the Dutch West India Company attempted to take part of Brazil as New Holland, resulting in thirty years of conflict with the Portuguese until finally being sold to Lisbon in 1661. France made several attempts to expand into South America, neither of them tremendously successful. From 1555 to 1567, French Huguenots made an attempt to establish the colony of France Antarctique in what is now Brazil, making an alliance with the Tamoio and Tupinambá Indians of the region, who were fighting the Portuguese, before being overcome by their more powerful neighbours. From 1612 to 1615, a second failed French attempt to seize part of the Brazilian coast was made in present-day São Luís, Brazil.

== European hegemony in the 18th century ==
The 18th century saw numerous wars as the European powers sought dominance and trade advantage in South America and along the sea-lanes of the region. Conflicts were limited by the difficulties of projecting land forces at such distances. Ongoing conflicts and revolts with native peoples continued, dominated by the logistical challenges of taking distant or inland territories before the development of the railway.

=== European wars and South America in the 1700s ===
George Anson's capture of a Manila galleon, painted by Samuel Scott.

Many conflicts in South America during the 18th century were the result of rivalries in the Old World. In 1739, the War of Jenkins' Ear broke out between Great Britain and Spain, the result of disagreement over trade rights and Spanish markets. The British attempted to isolate the Spanish colonies, sending George Anson to attack the annual gold shipments, whilst Admiral Edward Vernon unsuccessfully attempted to seize Cartagena de Indias, one of Spain's principal gold-trading ports in their colony of New Granada, modern-day Colombia. Although the half-hearted Spanish effort to turn their successful defence into an offensive ended in failure, Spain's victory in Cartagena de Indias was crucial in maintaining its access to the Atlantic sea-lanes and therefore its empire. The diplomatic resolution formed part of the wider settlement of the War of the Austrian Succession by the Treaty of Aix-la-Chapelle.

A few years later, war almost broke out again as a result of the Falklands crisis of 1770. Britain had considered claiming the Falkland Islands in 1748, but Spanish objections had caused the shelving of the plan. At the end of the Seven Years' War, however, France landed on the islands; at the same time, the British landed on the other end of the islands. France handed over their base to the Spanish, and a larger Spanish force forced the surrender of the British detachment. War looked imminent until the French withdrew their support for the Spanish position, and a compromise was reached. In 1771 the British were allowed to restore their base, but the ultimate question of sovereignty was not addressed – which would lead to several future conflicts over the next two centuries.

Finally, from 1806 to 1807 the British made a concerted attempt to seize control of the Río de la Plata region from the Spanish Empire, believing that the local population would rise up and support them. The invasions were in two phases. A British expeditionary force occupied Buenos Aires for 46 days in 1806 before being expelled. In 1807, a second British force occupied Montevideo, following their victory at the battle of Montevideo, remaining there for several months, and a third force made a second attempt to take Buenos Aires. After several days of street-fighting against colonial regulars and militia forces, in which a significant portion of the British forces in Buenos Aires were either killed or wounded, the British were forced to withdraw. The resistance of the local people and their active participation in the defence, with only a little direct support from the Spanish Kingdom, were important steps toward the subsequent wars of independence.

=== Native revolts and slavery ===
As large-scale slavery was introduced into South America, it began to impact military events. In the north-east, in modern-day Suriname and Guyana, escaped African slaves began to form a military buffer zone between the hostile inland tribes and the coastal areas. These so-called Maroons formed bands and in some cases armed camps. Amongst the slaves which remained, uprisings occurred throughout the period, the most famous, the Berbice Slave Uprising, began in 1763. Led by Cuffy, the slave revolt came to number about 3,000 and threatened European control over the Guianas before being crushed. In Brazil, these runaway slave communities, emerging from the 16th century onwards, were termed Palmares. By the 1690s, these communities numbered approximately 11,000, living in fortifications called macocos. Six Portuguese expeditions tried to conquer the Palmares between 1680 and 1686, but failed, only retaking the territories in 1694.

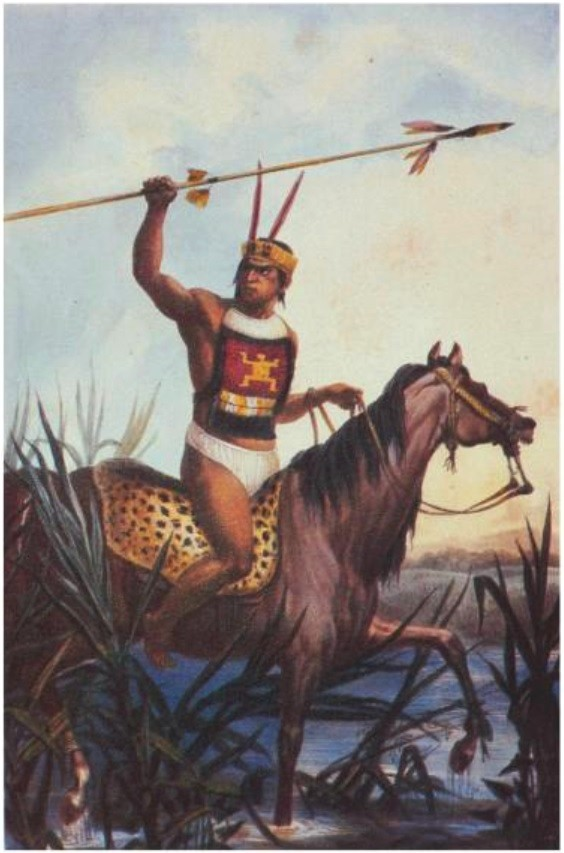
A native soldier depicted by Jean-Baptiste Debret, by this period mounted on horseback.

Despite the huge losses of the previous centuries, the native peoples of South America were not entirely suppressed. In the Andes, several major revolts occurred, with their leaders claiming authority by their descent from the Inca ruling family. In the 1650s, Pedro Bohórquez had himself crowned as the Inca emperor of the Calchaquíes Indians, fooling both Indians and Spanish alike. From 1742 onwards, Juan Santos Atahualpa led a revolt from the jungle settlement of Quisopango and Spain was not able to reassert control over the region until the 1780s. In 1780 another large-scale revolt occurred, under the leadership of Tupac Amaru II; his revolt spread quickly across the southern Andes, placing La Paz under siege, before Tupac Amaru II was captured and executed by the Spanish.

Many other tribes attempted to revolt against their colonial rulers. The Wayuu along the Venezuela-Colombia border had never been very subjugated by the Spanish and between 1701 and 1769 there were six rebellions, during which the Wayuu became famous for their use of firearms and horses in battle. In 1769, the largest of these, there were as many as 20,000 Wayuu under arms. In the south, another major revolt, the 'War of the Seven Reductions', occurred in 1754, when the Guarani tribes rose up against Spanish-Portuguese rule. The Guarani lived along the contested border in South America; when the colonial powers decided to redraw the boundaries at the Treaty of Madrid, the decision was taken to relocate the Guarani. Led by Sepé Tiaraju, the Guarani fought to avoid removal from 1754 to 1756, ultimately being defeated by the combined forces of Spain and Portugal.

Not all the revolts were indigenous in origin. The revolt of the Communeros broke out in Paraguay from 1721 to 1732, forming one of the first uprisings against Spanish colonial rule. Led by José de Antequera y Castro, the revolt formed around grievances between the settlers and the Spanish crown. In 1724 Viceroy José de Armendáriz sent in troops, who defeated the Comuneros. Antequera was captured, brought to Lima and executed. Further revolts in Asunción in 1730 and 1732 were also quelled.

== Wars of Independence, 19th century ==
The Wars of Independence in South America were the numerous wars against Spanish rule that took place during the early 19th century, from 1808 to 1829. The conflicts can be characterized both as a civil wars and a war of national liberation, since the majority of combatants on both sides were Spanish Americans and the goal of the conflict for one side was the independence of the Spanish colonies in the Americas. The events in Napoleonic Europe, during which France deposed Ferdinand VII of Spain and Maria I of Portugal provided the spark for conflict within both Spanish and Portuguese colonies between those pro-independence criollos who sought political and economic independence from Europe and royalist criollos, who supported the continued allegiance to and permanence within the Spanish or Portuguese empires. The conflict saw prolonged campaigns between poorly equipped, largely peasant forces, often in harsh conditions. By the end of the wars, the military relationship between South America and Europe had changed forever.

=== New Granada, Venezuela, Quito ===
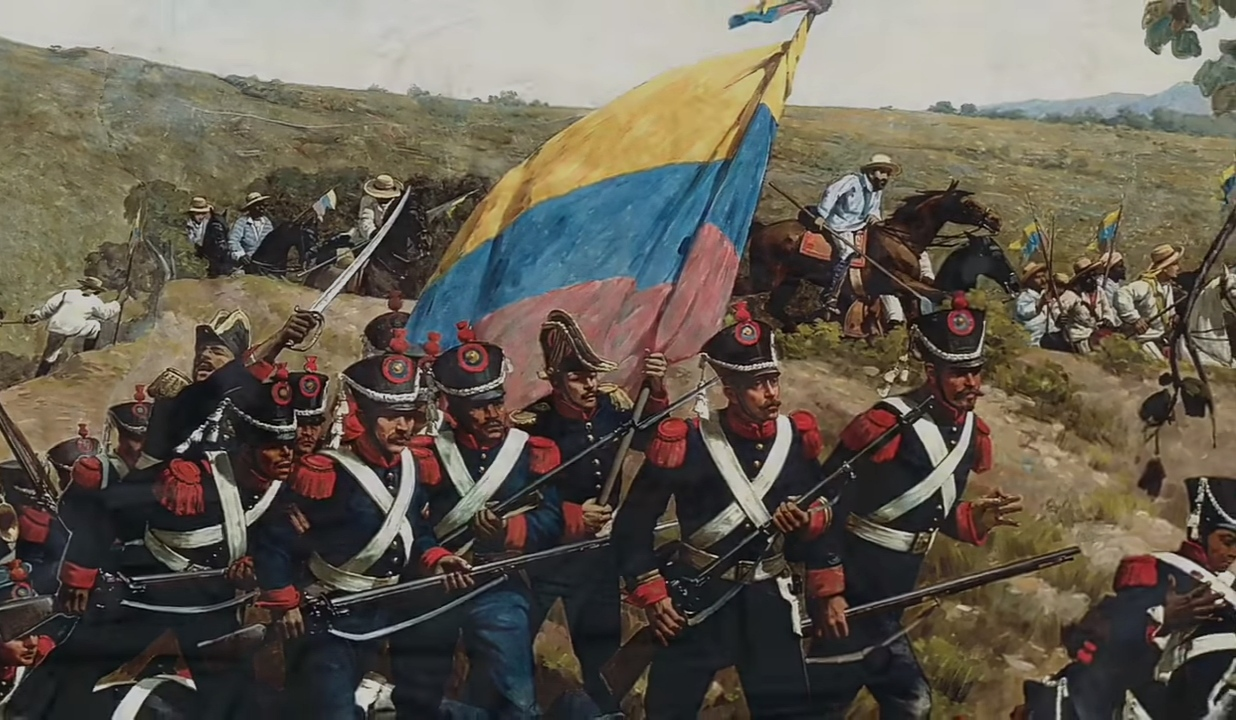
Detail of The Battle of Carabobo (1887) by Martín Tovar y Tovar. Federal Capitol of Venezuela.

New Granada responded to the troubles in Spain by establishing a sequence of city juntas in mid-1810, deposing the existing viceroy. The splintering of political authority continued as city juntas turned on one another militarily, marking the start of the period known as the Patria Boba, or the Foolish Fatherland. By contrast, in Venezuela, new juntas that emerged formed a joint Congress. The Congress initially upheld the deposed Spanish king's rights, but a faction proposing complete autonomy rapidly won favour, declaring independence as a republic in 1811. Civil war rapidly broke out between the juntas and the royalists in Venezuela. Blockaded by the Spanish regency and defeated at the battle of San Mateo the first Venezuelan republic collapsed in 1812. Simón Bolívar fled Venezuela and in 1813 joined the republican army of United Provinces of New Granada, achieving dominance over the other factions by late 1814. Bolívar was then authorised to lead a liberating force back into Venezuela in what became known as the Admirable Campaign, quickly defeating the royalist troops at the battle of Alto de los Godos. The Llanero people of the southern plains, however, then rebelled against the Criollo republicans, defeating them and reestablishing royalist control of Venezuela. Bolívar fought on, but a stalemate ensued in which the royalists controlled the highly populated, urban north and the republicans the vast, under-populated plains of the south.

The status quo did not last for long. In mid-1815 a large Spanish expeditionary force under Pablo Morillo had arrived in New Granada. Morillo retook Cartagena and by mid-1816 had conquered Bogotá and returned all of New Granada to royalist control. Bolívar reinvaded, defeating the royalists at Boyacá. The republicans of New Granada and Venezuela came together to form Gran Colombia as a united front against the royalists. In 1821 the Gran Colombian army won a decisive victory at the Battle of Carabobo, with the last royalist strongholds falling within two years. A Spanish fleet sent in 1823 was defeated at the Battle of Lake Maracaibo, marking the end of the war for independence in the north.

Meanwhile, in 1820, an independence movement had established itself in Ecuador, creating a junta and an army in Guayaquil; other towns in Ecuador declared independence in short order, leaving the way open for a campaign on the capital, Quito. By the end of the year, the majority of the country was firmly under republican rule. Field-Marshal Melchor Aymerich, acting president and supreme commander of the military forces in the Quito, then turned the tide of battle at Huachi and began to retake territory, triumphing again the following year at the battle of Tanizagua. Assistance from Gran Colombia arrived in the nick of time, however, in the form of General José Mires and large quantities of weapons. The republicans' first attempt to then take Quito in late 1821 failed with heavy casualties, but in 1822 victory at the battle of Pichincha finally saw a republican victory – Ecuador joined the union of Gran Colombia.

=== Río de la Plata and the region ===
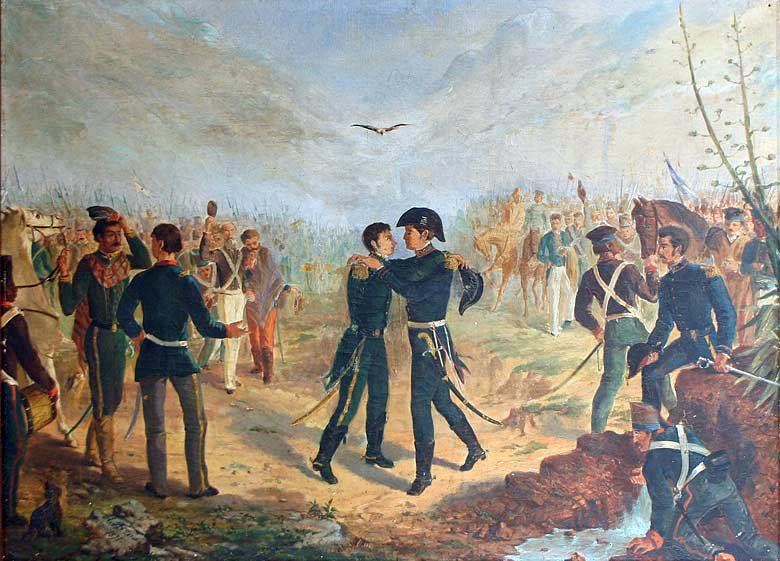
Meeting of José de San Martín and Manuel Belgrano at Yatasto.

In 1809, Upper Peru, modern Bolivia, saw the creation of two juntas in response to the situation in Spain; a rapid response by the viceroys of Lima and Buenos Aires crushed the revolt, and Upper Peru came under the control of the Viceroyalty of Peru which defended it vigorously. The following year, Buenos Aires itself formed a junta which removed the local Viceroy from power. The junta, presided by Cornelio Saavedra expanded to include deputies from the other provinces and became the known as the Junta Grande, or the "Big Junta". Two campaigns were ordered by the Junta Grande in order to gain support for the revolutionary ideas of Buenos Aires. The first of these was an attempt to conquer Upper Peru. An initial victory at the Battle of Suipacha led to reversals and the royalist victory at the Battle of Huaqui. The second campaign focused on Asunción in neighbouring Paraguay. Buenos Aires sent 1,100 troops under General Manuel Belgrano to Asunción, expecting to be welcomed as liberators; instead, they were defeated at Paraguarí and Tacuarí by local Paraguayan forces. The royalist governor in Asunción then became concerned about the loyalty of his men, and demobilised the victorious units. Discontent spread, and in May 1811 an uprising overthrew the governor, with Paraguayan independence being declared shortly afterwards.

Internal disagreements led to the fall of the Junta, and a sequence of campaigns between 1811 and 1815, in which commanders such as General Manuel Belgrano fought royalist armies from Upper Peru in a harsh, but chaotic sequence of campaigns, hampered by the governmental instability in Buenos Aires. The result was an effective stalemate. Meanwhile, Uruguay had shrugged off royalist rule several years before. In 1811, the royalist headquarters for the Viceroyalty of the Río de la Plata had retreated to Montevideo. José Gervasio Artigas invaded from Buenos Aires with 180 men, defeating the Spanish in April at the battle of Las Piedras and assuming control of the "Orientals", or modern Uruguay. By 1816 in Europe, King Ferdinand had been returned to in power, and an urgent decision was needed regarding independence. An assembly of representatives from most of modern-day Argentina, alongside those of present-day Uruguay, met at the Congress of Tucumán declaring full independence from the Spanish Crown as the United Provinces of South America. San Martín, who had distinguished himself in recent years, took military command and rejected yet another direct invasion in favour of a new strategy that would use Chile as an indirect means of liberating Upper Peru.

=== Chile, Peru and Upper Peru ===
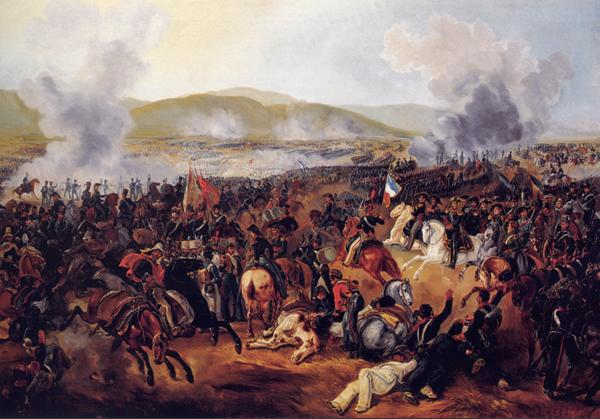
The battle of Maipú, 1818, effectively marking the end of Spanish rule in Chile.

In Chile, the conflict began in 1810, starting as an elitist political movement against the Spanish colonial master, now under the control of France, and finally ending as a fully-fledged civil war. Under the first stage of the conflict, the Patria Vieja campaign, the rebels, led primarily by José Miguel Carrera and his associated family, fought a sequence of battles resulting in defeat at the hands of the Royalist forces, who reoccupied Chile under the Reconquista. The royalist forces were aided by the increasing conflict between Carrera and his rival Bernardo O'Higgins, the two forces coming to open blows at the battle of Las Tres Acequias. Both Carrera and O'Higgins were forced to flee Chile.

Meanwhile, in Peru a similar conflict for independence has begun in 1809. During the previous decade Peru had been a stronghold for royalists, who fought those in favor of independence in Upper Peru, Quito and Chile. Local attempts at establishing juntas, led by Criollos in Huánuco in 1812 and during the rebellion of Cuzco from 1814 to 1816, were suppressed. Peru finally began to succumb in 1817 under the military pressure of José de San Martín. With large parts of Peru now independent, San Martín transited the Andes to Mendoza in Argentina, and then across into Chile, alongside his political ally O'Higgins, defeating royalist forces in the third and final part of the Chilean war, the Patria Nueva campaign, culminating in the battle of Maipú. Combining Peruvian and Chilean independent forces, including the newly formed Chilean Navy, San Martín and Simón Bolívar completed their campaign in Peru, which formally declared independence in 1821.

Meanwhile, the independent cause in Upper Peru had been kept alive by six guerrilla bands that formed in the backcountry of Upper Peru. The areas they controlled are called republiquetas in the historiography of Bolivia. Led by caudillos, they created quasi-states which attracted many followers from political exiles from the main urban centers to the fringe members of Criollo and Mestizo society, and where possible allied themselves with the regional Indian communities. A fifteen-year stalemate ensued. In 1824 the fight for independence gained new impetus after the battle of Ayacucho in which a combined army of 5,700 Gran Colombian and Peruvian troops under the command of Antonio José de Sucre defeated the royalist army of 6,500. The Colombians and Peruvians, who had already liberated Ecuador and Peru, tipped the balance of power in favor of the independence forces. The remaining royalists surrendered in 1825, and although Simón Bolívar, president of Gran Colombia and Peru at the time, was keen to incorporate Upper Peruvia into the wider federal state, local leaders supported full independence. A constituent congress renamed the country "Bolívar", later changed to Bolívia, later the same year.

=== Brazil ===
Prince Pedro declares independence for Brazil.

Brazil too was affected by the events in Napoleonic Europe, but in a rather different fashion. For a while Brazil formed the seat of King João VI and his government, after they fled from Napoleon's army in 1808. The Liberal Revolution of 1820 then led the royal family to return to Portugal, leaving the heir-apparent Prince Pedro as regent of the Kingdom of Brazil. Later in 1821, however, the Portuguese Assembly voted to abolish the Kingdom of Brazil and the royal agencies in Rio de Janeiro, thus subordinating all provinces of Brazil directly to Lisbon. Troops were sent to Brazil, and all Brazilian units were placed under Portuguese command. This marked the beginning of the Brazilian war of independence.

During the initial months, the situation remained tense. Lisbon sent reinforcements that arrived off Rio de Janeiro later in the year; they were not allowed to land, and returned to Portugal without bloodshed. Prince Pedro seized the initiative and in September 1822 he declared that he would deliver independence for Brazil, or die trying, announcing himself Emperor Pedro I of Brazil. Using various mercenary commanders, including Admiral Thomas Cochrane, the Emperor set about driving all of the Portuguese, many of whom were veterans of the Napoleonic Wars, out of Brazil, and establishing the central authority of Rio de Janeiro. Both sides generally avoided large, set-piece battle and by 1825 both sides were exhausted; and Pedro was able to acquire Portuguese recognition of Brazilian independence in exchange for significant financial compensation.

== European reintervention in 19th century ==
Despite the Monroe Doctrine, the 19th century saw significant European intervention in the military affairs of South America, mostly driven by commercial imperatives, and hampered by the huge logistical challenges involved.

=== British and French interventions ===
In January 1833, the United Kingdom of Great Britain and Ireland sent two naval vessels to re-assert British sovereignty over the Falkland Islands (Spanish: Islas Malvinas), after the United Provinces of the Río de la Plata, modern-day Argentina, ignored British diplomatic protests over the appointment of Luis Vernet as Governor of the Falkland Islands and a dispute over fishing rights. The episode, which ended without bloodshed when the badly outnumbered local United Provinces officer surrendered, remains politically contentious. Argentina claims that the population of the islands were expelled in 1833, however sources from the time suggest that the colonists were encouraged to remain.

During the 1830s and 1840s, the British and French governments were at odds with Rosas' leadership of the United Provinces, modern-day Argentina, and his economic policies of protecting the local industries with high tariffs. This had led to two naval blockades, a French one in 1838, and an Anglo-French one in 1845. By the 1840s, the advent of steam-powered sailing meant that merchant ships could easily sail up rivers that had previously been impassable; as a result British and French vessels had been sailing past Buenos Aires and trading directly inland, avoiding customs duties in the process. The Rosas government tried to stop this practice by declaring the Argentine rivers unnavigable by foreign countries, barring access to Paraguayan ports in the process. The British and French governments responded by intervening up the Paraná River in 1845 with a joint fleet of steam frigates, partially armoured and armed with rapid-fire guns and Congreve rockets. The result was a battle between an Argentinian fort that attempted to block the river and the European ships; the Anglo-French fleet had the best of the fight, but suffered considerable damage. The defence was enough to produce a political compromise in which France and Britain recognised the right of Buenos Aires to administer its own territories and rivers.

=== Spanish reintervention ===
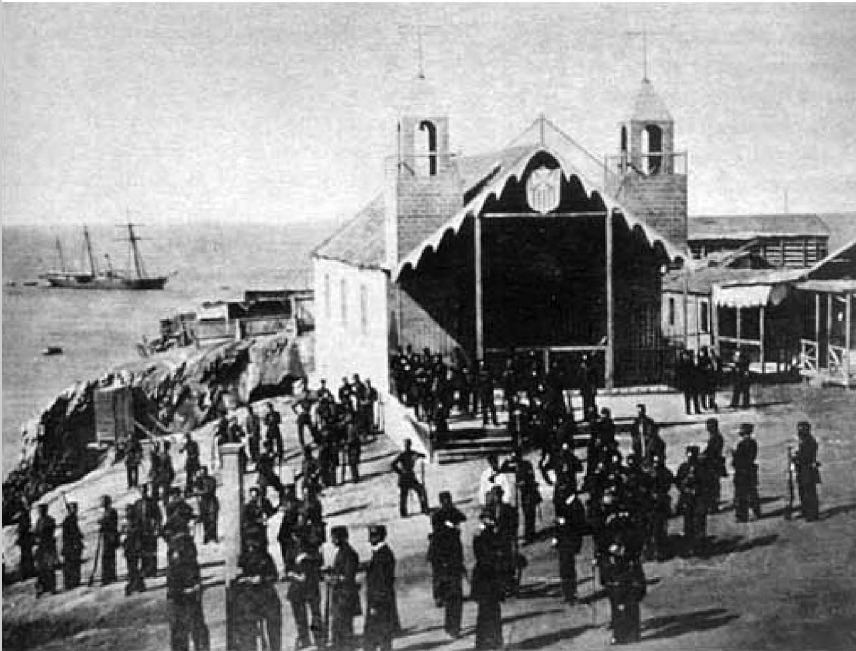
The Chincha islands of Peru, being occupied by Spanish sailors on April 14, 1864

The Chincha Islands War was a series of coastal and naval battles between the former colonial power of Spain and Peru and Chile between 1864 and 1866. During the 1860s Spain had built up a very large naval force and was involved in a sequence of new colonial ventures around the world. In 1862, a Spanish naval expedition, including steam frigates, was sent to South America under Admiral Luis Hernández Pinzón; the visit went badly and diplomatic relations went downhill, with Spain demanding compensation and then the repayment of former debts from the wars of independence.

In April 1864, the Spanish fleet seized the lightly defended Chincha Islands in an attempt to force Peru to provide payment – the islands were the principal source of valuable Peruvian guano. The Spanish vessels also blockaded Peruvian ports. An attempt to produce a diplomatic solution failed when the Peruvian Congress refused to ratify it. Anti-Spanish sentiment was growing rapidly in the region, and Chile first declared that it would not sell coal supplies to the Spanish navy and then, when Spain demanded compensation, came out openly in support of Peru against Spain, declaring war. Ecuador and Bolivia joined the alliance the next year. It became evident that Spain was over extended. An isolated Spanish vessel was captured at the battle of Papudo, and Spanish attempts to blockade Chile as well as Peru were undermined by the distances involved, although Spanish naval bombardment, as at the Valparaíso bombardment which destroyed most of the Chilean merchant navy, could cause significant damage. The inconclusive battle of Abtao was followed by the battle of Callao. Since the Spanish navy was defeated by the Peruvian ships and coastal defenses on the first and second occasion respectively, morale was increasingly low and the Spanish eventually decided to withdraw from the Chincha Islands and return to Spain.

== Regional wars and discontent in the 19th century ==
The remainder of the 19th century was a violent time in South America, seeing numerous wars between the newly independent states. The conflicts were driven by the uncertain frontiers of the colonial period, attempts to achieve regional dominance, and the importance of trade and the consequent involvement of many European nations in the internal affairs of the continent. As the century progressed, the growing wealth of South America allowed the creation of larger and more modern armies than in the revolutionary period, with the death toll of the wars increasing as a result.

=== The rivalry between Argentina and Brazil ===
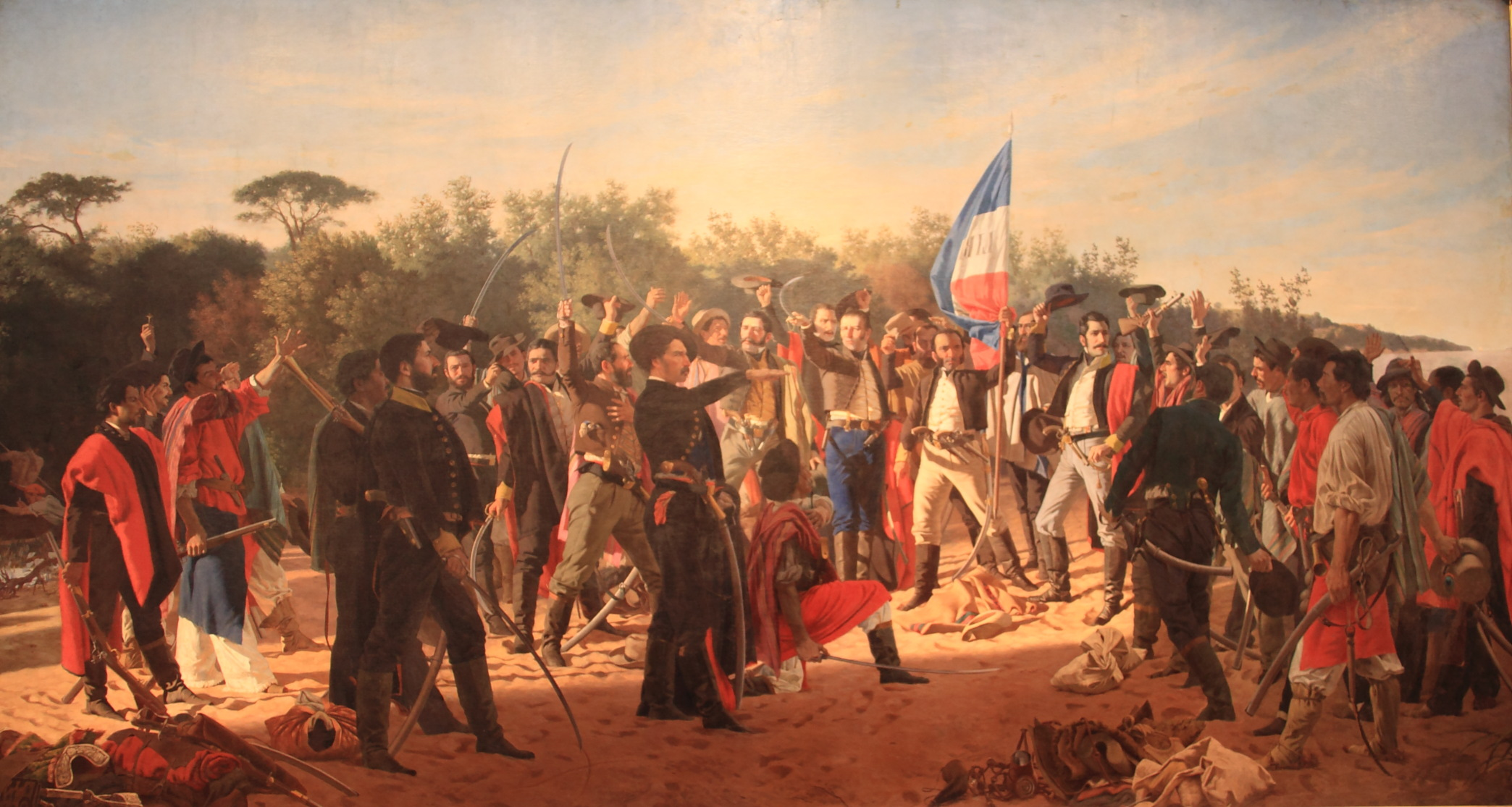
Oath of the 33 Orientales to the Uruguayan Republic.

With independence, United Provinces of the Río de la Plata, centred on modern-day Argentina with its capital in Buenos Aires, found itself in competition with the neighbouring Empire of Brazil for dominance across the Río de la Plata. The first conflict to emerge concerned the long-disputed Banda Oriental, or 'Eastern Strip', approximately present-day Uruguay; it had been re-annexed by Portugal in 1821, giving the country a strategic position over the Río de la Plata and control over the United Provinces' main port. Dom Pedro I then declared the region a province within the Empire of Brazil. Intending to regain control of the region, the United Provinces urged the people of the region, known as Orientales (or 'Easterners'), to rise up, giving them political and material support. In response, Brazil declared war on the United Provinces.

The first military moves occurred at sea, as Brazil blockaded the ports of Buenos Aires and Montevideo. On land, however, Buenos Aires held the initial advantage, pushing into Brazilian territory and winning the battle of Ituzaingó. Dom Pedro I commenced his offensive the next year, hampered by the ongoing rebellions across much of Brazil at the time. By 1828, Uruguayan leader Fructuoso Rivera had conquered the northern territories, but not decisively. The high cost of the war was affecting both sides by this time, and the damage to trade was concerning the British, resulting in both parties signing the Treaty of Montevideo acknowledging the independence of most of the disputed territory in the form of the Estado Oriental del Uruguay. The northern section was retained by Brazil.

Soon after the end of the Cisplatine War Don Juan Manuel de Rosas was elected governor of Buenos Aires in 1832. Rosas wished to create a state in the image of the Viceroyalty of the Río de la Plata, allowing Argentina to become the main power in South America. To achieve this, it would be necessary to integrate the three neighbouring countries of Bolivia, Uruguay and Paraguay, and most part of the southern region of Brazil.

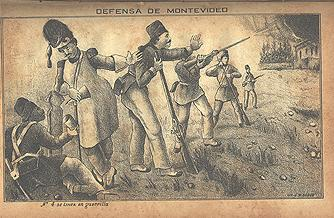
An illustration of the defense of Montevideo from Isidoro De-Maria's book, Anales de la defensa de Montevideo.

Meanwhile, the new state of Uruguay remained unstable and deeply split. On one side, the conservative Blancos, or Whites, represented the bulk of the business interests, and were supported by France, the United Kingdom. On the other side, the liberal Colorados, or Reds, favoured protectionism against European imports and represented many of the rural areas. Brazil chose to support the Colorados, whilst the dictator of the United Provinces, Manuel de Rosas, was a close friend of the Blanco President Manuel Oribe. In 1838, a European-backed Colorado army took up arms against Oribe and Uruguay became the centre of the 'Great War', as rival armies backed by the different countries fought for control. The siege of Montevideo, which began in February 1843, would ultimately last for nine years. Rosas' options were limited by the pressure from European states not to interfere with international shipping. In 1845, when access to Paraguay was blocked, Britain and France allied against Rosas, seized his fleet and began a blockade of Buenos Aires, resulting in an accommodation.

Brazilian emperor Dom Pedro II passed out of his minority in the late 1840s. For imperial Brazil, a powerful republican United Provinces was seen as an existential threat to the monarchy. The maintenance of an independent Paraguay and Uruguay was essential if Brazil was to retain its primacy in the region. In 1849, Brazil decided to launch an attack in the south with its powerful standing army, and in preparation for this formed first a military alliance with Bolivia, and a defensive military alliance with the Colorado Uruguayan government, and then a treaty of offensive alliance between Uruguay, Brazil and rebellious elements of the United Provinces. A large Brazilian army, backed by the Brazilian Armada along the coast, intervened in Uruguay, where the outnumbered Oribe surrendered his forces without a fight. The Brazilian fleet prevented any of his forces from escaping to Argentina. With Uruguay now under the complete control of the Colorados, the alliance renewed their treaty, with the new aim of removing Rosas from power. The battle of Caseros saw a victory for the alliance, and Rosas retreated in defeat to England, marking a period of imperial hegemony for the Brazilian empire across the region.

=== Paraguayan War ===
The Paraguayan War (also known as the War of the Triple Alliance), one of the most violent wars to be fought in South America, commenced in 1864 between Paraguay and the allied countries of Argentina, Brazil, and Uruguay. Paraguay had evolved since independence under the rule of the López family; government was harsh, and the López family ruled the country as it would a large property estate. Paraguay's President Francisco Solano López was deeply patriotic, but also ambitious, perhaps arrogant, and possibly insane. In the years before the war, he had invested heavily in building up a military and a standing army capable of taking on his larger neighbours; he increasingly looked eastwards towards the possibilities of an Atlantic port and access to valuable trade routes.

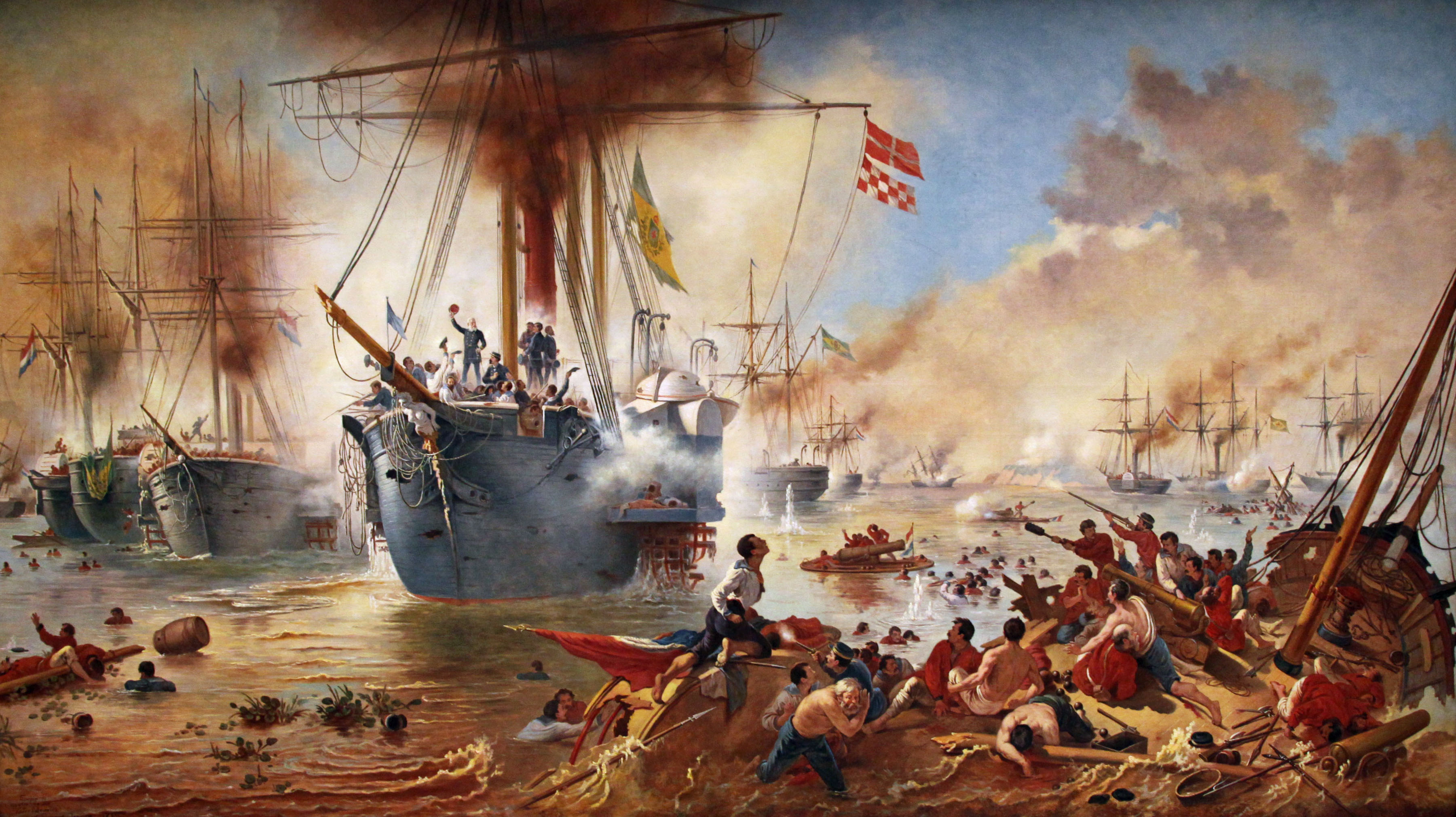
The Battle of Riachuelo was a key battle in the war.

López had forged an alliance with the Blanco faction in Uruguay. The tensions between the different factions in Uruguay, combined with the links between Uruguay and those territories absorbed into Brazil in 1828, meant that renewed military conflict remained a real possibility. When Brazil intervened to support its own clients, the Colorado faction, López declared war on Brazil. López then invaded Argentina in order to move forces quickly against Brazil, leading to Argentina joining the war on Brazil's side. The triple alliance – Brazil, Argentina and Uruguay – were outnumbered at the start of the conflict on land, but held a clear advantage at sea, thanks to Brazil's naval Armada. Initially, Paraguayan forces had the advantage and advanced rapidly. The alliance responded at the naval battle of Riachuelo in 1865, where the Brazilian fleet commanded by Francisco Manoel Barroso da Silva won, destroying the Paraguayan navy. The battle decided the outcome of the war in favour of the Triple Alliance, as the limitations on road transport mean that rivers were critical to military maneuver. By the end of 1865, the Triple Alliance was on the offensive on land and were prepared to invade Paraguay. The invasion itself ground on, marked by high rates of disease and attrition. It was not until 1869 that Asunción was finally occupied, and the conflict then turned into a drawn-out guerrilla war that lasted until López was killed in 1870. The result was disastrous for Paraguay – some estimates place total Paraguayan losses — through both war and disease — as high as 1.2 million people, or 90% of its pre-war population. It took decades for Paraguay to recover from the destruction.

For Uruguay, too, peace remained hard to come by. Civil war broke out again in 1871 in the 'Revolution of the Lances', named after an improvised weapon used by South American militias. Timoteo Aparicio, leading the Blanco faction, fought until 1872, when a temporary compromise was achieved with the ruling Colorado faction. The final battle of the long-running civil war was not fought until 1904, when the battle of Masoller resulting in victory for the Colorado forces.

=== Wars along the Pacific Rim ===
In 1828, in the aftermath of the wars of independence, the Republic of Peru and Gran Colombia, a confederation of the modern-day countries of Colombia, Ecuador, Panama, and Venezuela, went to war over disputed territories along their border: the Gran Colombia–Peru War. During the campaign for independence, there had been agreement that the new state lines should follow the old colonial boundaries. The ambiguities and changes during the colonial years, however, made this principle challenging to apply in practice. Early in 1828, Peru launched a campaign against Bolivia to take back the disputed territory and ultimately forced the Colombian military units stationed there out of Bolivia. Bolívar declared war on Peru in June; Peru responded in kind in July. Naval battles along the coast began shortly afterwards. Initially successful on land, the Peruvians were setback at the Battle of Tarqui in 1829. Following a military coup in Peru, the Convenio de Girón was signed, invoking the status quo based on the old, still disputed, colonial frontiers – almost guaranteeing future conflicts. The dissolution of Gran Colombia in 1830 complicated matters further, with Peru later arguing that the Convenio de Girón ceased to apply with the fragmentation of one of the signatories.

Tensions over borders in the Andes continued, with the Ecuadorian–Peruvian War (1857–1860), a long-running conflict. Ecuador had effectively ceded long-disputed territory in the Amazon Basin to British creditors. This angered the Peruvian government, who demanded the transaction to be nullified. When Ecuador refused, war broke out. The Peruvian navy moved quickly to blockade the entire Ecuadorian coast and their army moved in and occupied Guayaquil, Ecuador's largest city and port. With little other option, Ecuador signed the Treaty of Mapasingue, declaring the cession null and settling the border dispute in Peru's favour. Ecuador regarded the treaty as inequitable, and the conflict was not to be resolved until late in the 20th century.

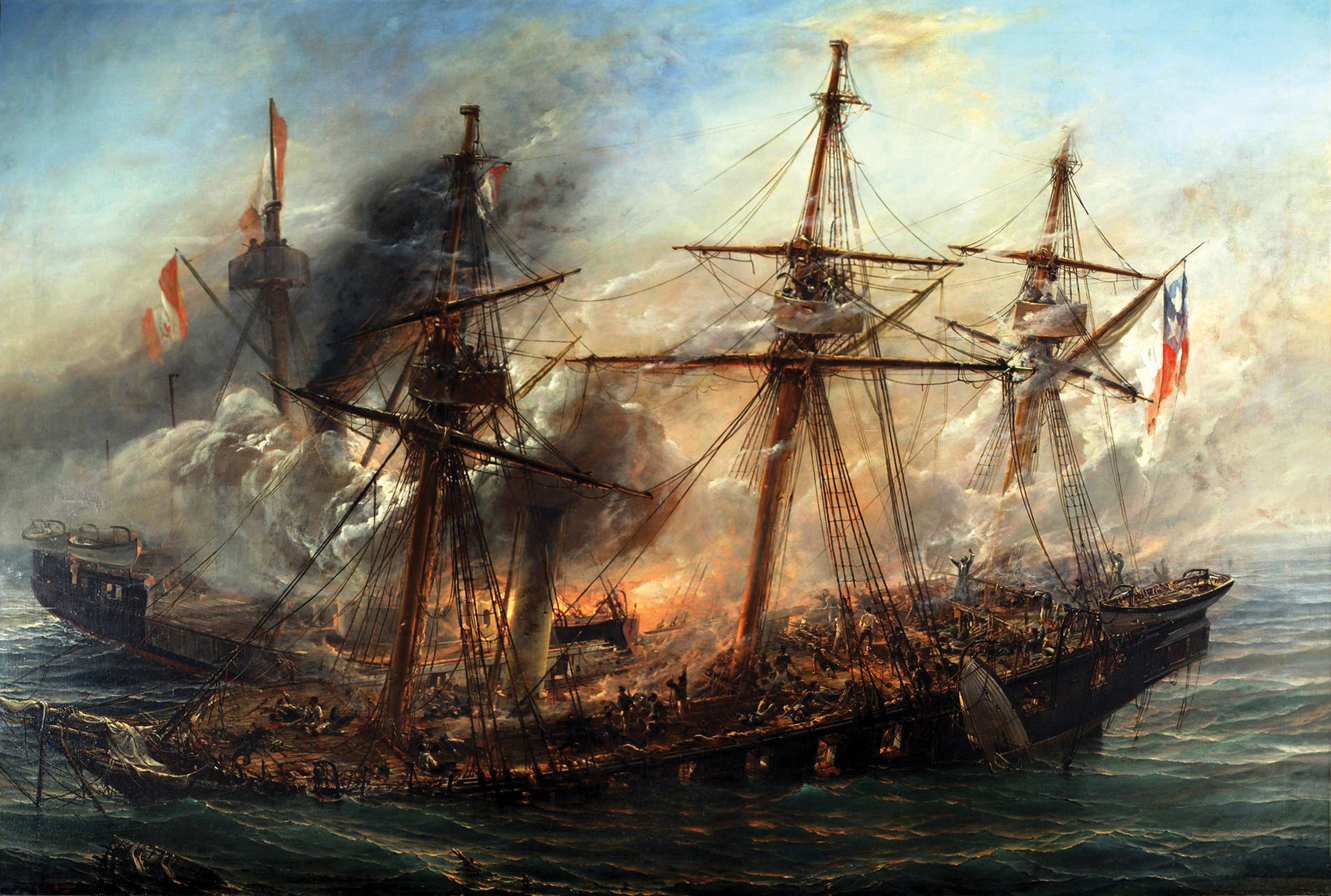
Naval Battle of Iquique: the Esmeralda versus the Huáscar.

The next major conflict, the War of the Pacific grew out of the initial dispute between Chile and Bolivia for control over part of the Atacama Desert on the Pacific coast. Technical advances in the 1840s made the desert's guano deposits incredibly valuable, and international investment poured in. The usual colonial-era ambiguities meant that the borders were uncertain. An arms race to build modern, ironclad vessels began. Peru signed a secret treaty of alliance with Bolivia; arguments between Chile and Bolivia grew, Peruvian mediation failed amidst the Chilean discovery of the secret treaty, and in 1879 violence broke out. The desert terrain meant that control of the coastal seas would be decisive; Bolivia had no navy of its own, and Peru faced fiscal problems that rendered many of its vessels unusable. Although also stretched financially, Chile's navy, upgraded and modernised, was in much better shape. Peru fell back on highly effective raiding activity, requiring three naval battles at Chipana, Iquique and Angamos before the larger Chilean force could achieve sea dominance. The naval battles and landings were keenly observed, as they saw the deployment of the then novel armor-piercing shells, naval torpedoes, torpedo boats, and purpose-built landing craft. On land, the Chilean forces were successful, and by early 1880, Bolivia had been forced to withdraw from the war entirely. The battle of Arica, another Chilean victory, saw the first use of land mines in South America. In January 1881, the Chileans took the Peruvian capital, Lima, and after several years of guerrilla warfare Peru and Chile signed the Treaty of Ancón, by which Peru's Department of Tarapacá was ceded to the victor; on its part, Bolivia was forced to cede Antofagasta.

=== Indigenous revolts and conquests ===
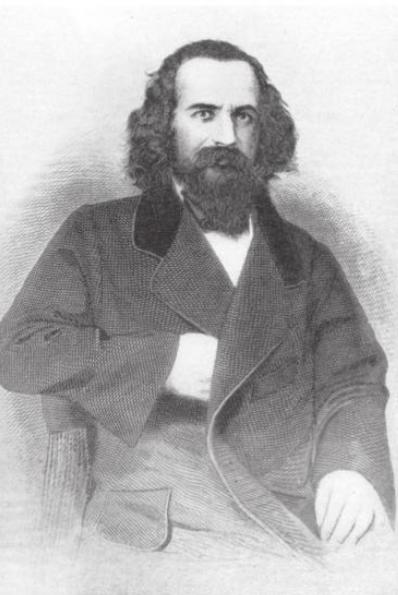
Orélie-Antoine I, King of Araucania and Patagonia.

The balance of power with the indigenous peoples turned steadily in the favour of the newly independent states during the second half of the 19th century. The Mapuche still remained largely autonomous in the 1860s, following several centuries of resistance to Spanish, and then Chilean, rule – but pressure was increasing. In 1860, the French lawyer and adventurer named Orélie-Antoine de Tounens visited the region and established Nouvelle France, also sometimes called the Kingdom of Araucania and Patagonia. This provided the trigger for Chilean action, who invaded and captured Orélie-Antoine, detaining him as a lunatic. Over the next twenty years the Chilean military set about building roads and telegraph systems, pacifying the region and forcibly assimilating the Mapuche into Chilean society. The Mapuche fought back, particularly during the War of the Pacific, but were ultimately defeated – some indigenous remnants were placed into reservations and their land given to Chilean and foreign settlers. Argentina also led their own campaign of pacification in neighbouring Patagonia, the "Conquest of the Desert" during the 1870s, spurred by greed, the military success of Chileans, and recent uprisings. Initially the military aimed at simply enabling white colonialisation of the desert, but in 1877 military efforts began to extinguish, subdue and expel the local Indians in their entirety. Some Mapuche were forced into Chile, whilst the remaining indigenous peoples largely perished.

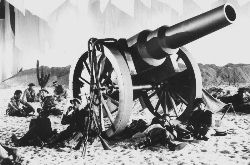
A Matadeira (The Killer), a British-manufactured cannon used in the War of Canudos by the Brazilian Army against the rebels. It was pulled by 21 pairs of oxen and fired only once.

Brazil saw a number of large armed revolts during the century, usually caused by the distance from the political capital and economic difficulties. One of the first was the Balaiada, a social revolt that occurred between 1838 and 1841 in the interior of the province of Maranhão, Brazil. The imperial government combined political pacification with an effective military offensive, pacifying the province by 1841. Another revolt, the Ragamuffin War, involved declaring of a new state, the Piratini Republic with the support of the Italian revolutionary Giuseppe Garibaldi. After many deaths, both revolts were resolved diplomatically. By contrast, the War of Canudos, which took place in Bahia, north-eastern Brazil from 1893 to 1897, ended violently after heavy artillery bombardment. The Contestado War, an uprising in southern Brazil between 1912 and 1916, was to drag on for several years before being completely suppressed by purely military means.

Towards the end of the century, Brazil saw several large revolts in its navy – a force still heavily dominated, amongst the other ranks at least, by black sailors. In 1893, the Revolta da Armada occurred in Rio de Janeiro, focused on the federal government – it lasted seven months before being ultimately suppressed. In 1910, Chibata Revolt occurred, during which more than 2,000 sailors rebelled against the use of physical punishments for military offences, in particular the use of the chibata, a type of whip associated with the slave trade. The mutineers, mostly black, threatened to destroy the city unless their demands were met. An amnesty was declared and the use of the whip brought to an end, but after the mutineers had stood down, the Government rescinded the amnesty and imposed harsh punishments.

== South America and the Global Wars ==
During the World Wars and the eventual Cold War, South America's distance from the main theatres of conflicts and the economic benefits of neutrality minimised its military involvement in these global conflicts. By the 1960s, Marxism had given a new context to the revolts of earlier centuries, and gave additional encouragement to the involvement of the military in civilian society and government.

=== The naval arms race of the early 1900s ===
The naval blockade imposed against Venezuela by the United Kingdom, Germany and Italy from December 1902 to February 1903, after President Cipriano Castro refused to pay foreign debts and damages suffered by European citizens in recent Venezuelan civil wars.

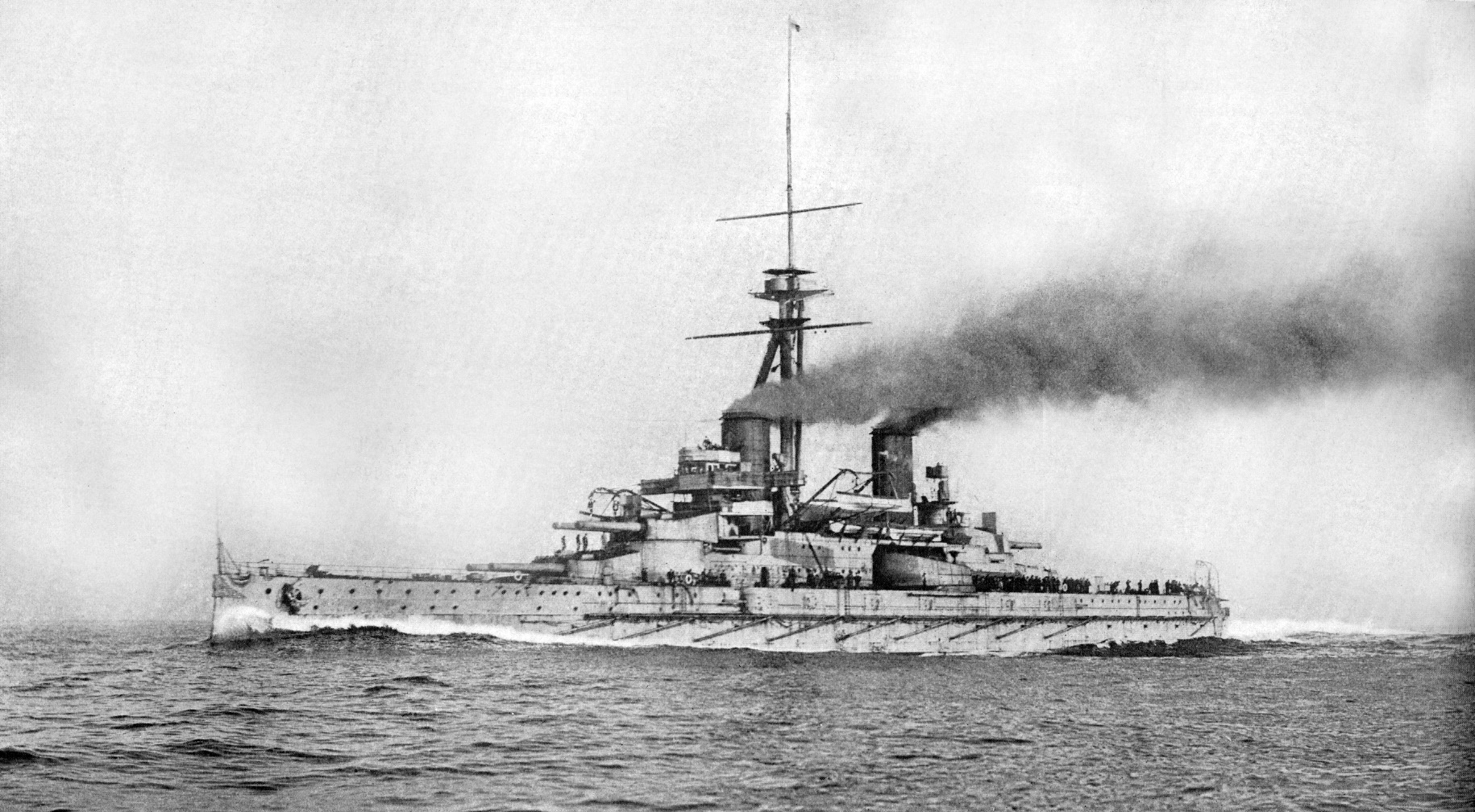
Brazilian battleship Minas Geraes

At the beginning of the 20th century, another naval arms race emerged in South America. During much of the previous century, the Brazilian imperial Armada had enjoyed a decisive naval advantage, but following the Brazilian revolution of 1889, the nation's navy fell into disrepair. By the turn of the 20th century, it was lagging behind those of Chile and Argentina. Soaring demand for coffee and rubber brought the Brazilian economy an influx of revenue, some of which was used to finance a 1904 Naval rearmament program. Before the bulk of the work could be completed, however, HMS Dreadnought was launched in 1906, leading Brazil to alter her order for two, far more expensive vessels of a similar design. Minas Geraes and São Paulo instantly changed the balance of naval power in the region, sparking a new arms race; Chile ordered the dreadnoughts Almirante Latorre and Almirante Cochrane from Britain, and Argentina commissioned two vessels from the United States—Rivadavia and Moreno. The cost was colossal—over a quarter of each country's annual national income was being spent on naval procurement during the period. These extraordinary monetary sums, combined with a collapse in Brazil's rubber boom and declining trade revenues during the First World War, eventually brought the naval arms race to a halt.

=== World War I ===
With the exception of Brazil, the independent states of South America were not greatly involved in the conflict of the First World War. Despite the internal political tensions within the country, Brazil entered into World War I in 1917 alongside the Triple Entente, after initially adopting neutrality. Brazil's contribution was valued, but modest, essentially little more than symbolic from a military perspective. Its primary contribution was in the naval war in the Atlantic, though it also sent a unit to the Western front.

Such military action that did occur in South America was naval, and focused on a force of German Naval vessels led by commander Maximilian von Spee. In an effort to avoid being trapped in South East Asia, Spee had attempted to sail across the Pacific, to round Cape Horn, and then force his way back home to Germany. Sir Christopher Cradock was sent to intercept Maximilian von Spee with two older armoured cruisers; Spee decisively defeated him in November 1914 at the battle of Coronel off the coast of Chile. From there, Spee stopped at Valparaíso in Chile before continuing on to raid the coaling station at Stanley in the Falkland Islands. Unfortunately, he was unaware that large force of modern British ships were now based at Stanley, and Spee's force was destroyed in the ensuing Battle of the Falkland Islands.

=== World War II ===
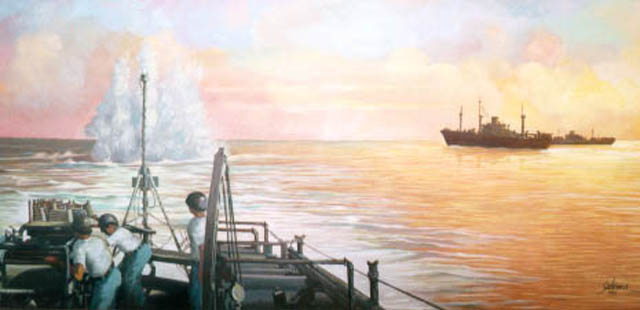
Brazilian Navy on anti-submarine warfare in the Atlantic Ocean, during the Battle of the Atlantic, WWII, 1942.

Once again, Second World War had less military impact on South America than in many parts of the world, with the exception of Brazil. Because the country had joined the war on the Allies side and had allowed the United States to establish naval and air bases on its territory, it came under strong attack by Germany. The Axis powers were interested in disrupting the essential supply lines for the Allies in North Africa campaign. This supply line started in the Brazilian city of Natal. Therefore, Brazil suffered the only Axis attacks in South America. Over 35 Brazilian ships were sunk by German and Italian warships in the South Atlantic. In response to the attacks, the Brazilian Air Force and the Brazilian Navy sank over nine German submarines or U-boats. The following U-boats were sunk just of the coast of Brazil by Brazilian Armed Forces, U-164, U-128, U-590, U-513, U-662, U-598, U-199, U-591 and U-161. The unexpected success of the Brazilian Armed Forces against its U-boats, combined with a strong American presence in the Brazilian territory, made Germany abandon the South Atlantic after 1943. Brazil was also the only South American country to fight in the European war theater, deploying a 25,000 strong joint force – the Brazilian Expeditionary Force (FEB). The Brazilian Army and Air Force fought in Italy and the Navy in the Atlantic Ocean. Just under a thousand Brazilian servicemen died during the conflict.

The beginning of the Second World War, like the first, however, began with naval action off the South American coastline. The Admiral Graf Spee, a modern Deutschland-class cruiser, was named after the German admiral lost in the previous war. She had been sent to the region as a commerce raider with the task of sinking British merchant shipping, but avoiding combat with superior enemy forces. Numerous British hunting groups were assigned to find her, with three British ships finally tracking her down in December 1939. The Battle of the River Plate ensued, during which the Graf Spee was damaged. She docked for repairs in the neutral port of Montevideo, but was forced by international law to leave within 72 hours. Faced with what he believed to be overwhelming odds, her captain scuttled his ship rather than risk the lives of his crew.

=== Cold War ===
The Cold War had its impact on South America, albeit less than in many parts of the world, but by the 1970s the ideological struggle was heavily impacting military affairs. On one hand, an increasing number of civilian governments across the region were being ousted by military dictatorships, usually extreme right-wing in nature and allied to the West; on the other hand, an increasing number of left-wing orientated guerrilla and terrorist organizations were being established. The result was a sequence of harsh, dirty military confrontations. In Uruguay, the Tupamaro movement, named after the Túpac Amaru II revolt in the 18th century, emerged during the 1960s to confront the Military of Uruguay. Branches of the Tupamaro movement began to establish themselves across the region. In Argentina, the People's Revolutionary Army began a violent campaign against the security forces and military. In 1975, as the US shifted its focus after their humiliating defeat in the Vietnam War, various South American regimes responded with the collaborative, international counterinsurgency campaign known as Operation Condor. It was a campaign of political repression involving assassination and intelligence; the militaries of South America were heavily involved. One of the most famous elements of this confrontation, the "Dirty War" of Argentina, saw a vicious response to the killings of military officers and police in leftist action, with thousands of suspects killed by the authorities. In Chile, the government of General Augusto Pinochet similarly used his military to undertake similar operations.

The 1980s saw a resurgence of violence in other parts of South America. In Peru, the Shining Path movement launched a Maoist guerrilla campaign from the countryside, starting a war which has still not entirely concluded today, with a significant loss of life. In Colombia, the 1960s Communist guerrilla organization the Revolutionary Armed Forces of Colombia – People's Army, or FARC, enjoyed a resurgence in the 1980s with the advent of drugs money. The war between the Colombian armed forces and FARC is ongoing; according to the Colombian government, as of 2008, FARC had an estimated 6,000–10,000 members, down from 16,000 in 2001, having lost about half their fighting force after President Álvaro Uribe took office in 2002.

== Legacy conflicts ==
Numerous legacy issues remained in South America into the 20th century, some of which attracted military solution. Military technology was increasing throughout the period, with the introduction of mobile warfare and aircraft – but logistics and the sheer cost of modern warfare remained key challenges, leading to an increasing trend towards diplomatic solutions over the period.

=== Border disputes ===
The Chaco War, fought between Bolivia and Paraguay between 1932 and 1935, was another conflict motivated by economics. The contested Gran Chaco region was thought to be rich in oil, with the international oil companies vying for exploitation rights – Standard Oil backing Bolivia, with Shell Oil supporting Paraguay. It could also provide a valuable access for either landlocked country to the Atlantic Ocean. To add to the problem, both Bolivia and Paraguay had lost significant territories in the previous century, and were keen to rebuild their strength. Border skirmishes throughout the late 1920s culminated in an all-out war in 1932. Although much smaller, Paraguay undertook a complete mobilisation of its resources and fought the conflict in an unconventional style, making the war a more balanced proposition. Much of the technology deployed was new; Bolivia deployed three Vickers 6-Ton tanks during the war, and both sides making use of aerial warfare for the first time in South America. The cost of these new weapons was crippling to both sides. By the time a ceasefire was negotiated in 1935, Paraguay controlled most of the region. This was recognised in a 1938 truce, signed in Buenos Aires, under which Paraguay was awarded three-quarters of the disputed region, with Bolivia keeping the remaining territory. Some years later it was found that there were no oil resources in the Gran Chaco region kept by Paraguay, but the territories kept by Bolivia were, in fact, rich in natural gas and petroleum.

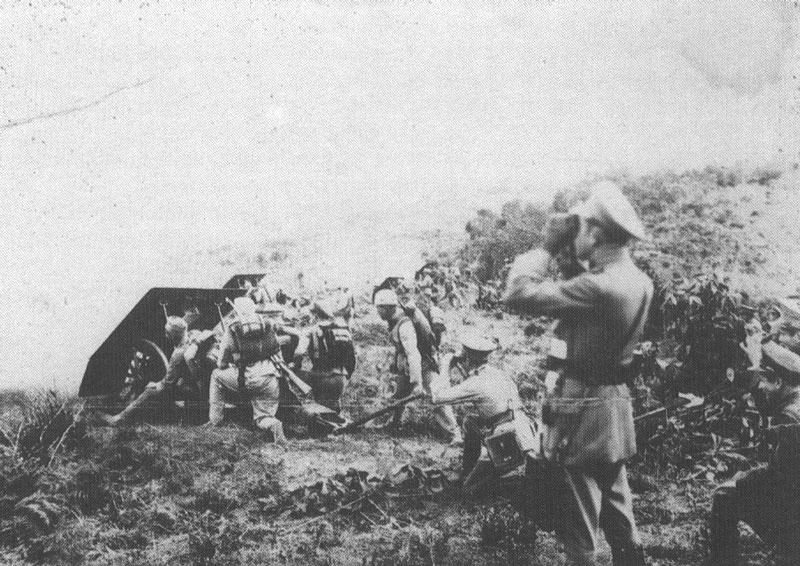
Fighting in the Colombia–Peru War

Colombia and Peru resumed their ongoing disagreements over borders in 1932, resulting in the Colombia–Peru War. Attempts to demilitarise the disputed regions had been tried, but in the aftermath of insurrections in Peru, forces were deployed into the disputed region, on the then Colombian side of the border. Domestic opinion in Colombia responded aggressively and demanded a response. In practice, the region was sufficiently remote that this proved difficult. After some desultory fighting both sides signed the Rio de Janeiro Protocol, reaffirming the previous border agreements. Peru and Ecuador also renewed their long-running territorial arguments in 1941 in the Ecuadorian–Peruvian War. National accounts vary as to which side commenced the conflict, but the fighting rapidly escalated. Peru fielded Czech tanks with air support, and seized Puerto Bolívar by paradrop, the first event of its kind in South America. Within seven weeks, Peru had occupied the whole of the disputed region and, under pressure, Ecuador signed the Rio Protocol in 1942, affirming Peru's control of the territory. The conflict was to recur twice more before ultimate resolution. In 1981, the Paquisha War broke out between the two nations, ending in a ceasefire and the Peruvian Army in control of most of the area. In the aftermath of the incident, both sides increased their military presence up and down the Cordillera del Cóndor area and the Cenepa valley, starting a cycle of tensions and provocations that ended up producing another military confrontation in 1995, the Cenepa War. This conflict was indecisive, with both sides claiming victory, and after the mediation efforts of the United States of America, Brazil, Argentina, and Chile, the two sides finally signed a definitive peace agreement in 1998. On the recent past see South American Long Peace.

=== Falkland Islands war ===
The unresolved tensions from the British re-establishment of rule on the Falkland Islands in 1833 gave a context for the 1982 conflict between Argentina and the United Kingdom over the islands. The initial invasion in April 1982 was characterised by Argentina as the re-occupation of its own territory, and by the UK as an invasion of a British overseas territory. Britain launched a naval task force to engage the Argentine Navy and Argentine Air Force, and retake the islands by amphibious assault. The use of Britain's nuclear submarine force led to the sinking of the Argentinian cruiser the Belgrano and the consequent non-intervention of the Argentine navy. In the air, the use of Exocet missiles showed the vulnerability of the British fleet, but the task force successfully landed on islands. A challenging land campaign, including the battle of Goose Green, resulted in the defeat of the Argentinian land forces. At the end of combat operations on 14 June the islands remained under British control. The political effects of the war were strong in both countries, leading to the downfall of the Argentinian military government and the bolstering of government of Prime Minister Margaret Thatcher in the United Kingdom.

== See also ==
- History of South America
- South American Long Peace
- Simón Bolívar
- José de San Martín
- Francisco Pizarro
