= Loble =

Loble, also known as Lig-lemu or Lillemu,(d. ca. 1565) was the Mapuche vice-toqui of the Moluche north of the Bio-Bio River who led the second Mapuche revolt during the Arauco War.

After a brief fight Loble defeated the troops of captain Francisco de Vaca in the Itata River valley who were coming with reinforcements from Santiago. After Millalelmo ambushed Spanish reinforcements coming from Angol under Juan Perez de Zurita, at a crossing of the Andalién River the Mapuche had cut off the city and garrison of Concepcion from outside aid by land.

Millalelmu and Loble besieged Concepcion with 20,000 warriors in February 1564. The siege lasted until at the end of March two ships arrived bringing food that would permit the siege to continue for a much longer time. On the other side the Mapuche had used up local sources of food and were finding it difficult to maintain their large force. With the harvest season coming and with the news of their defeat in the Battle of Angol they were nervous that their families might starve or their undefended homes might be attacked from Angol or Santiago. They raised their siege on April 1, and dispersed to their homes for the winter.

The governor Pedro de Villagra left Santiago in mid January 1565 with 150 Spaniards and 800 Indian auxiliaries and marched south to the Maule River. During the seven months Villagra was in Santiago, Loble had built a strong pucara on the Perquilauquén River, blocking the road south to Concepcion and in the Second Battle of Reinohuelén Villagra rapidly took it and destroyed the Mapuche army holding it. Soon afterward as Loble was bringing up reinforcements but unaware of the defeat of his army he was ambushed, defeated and captured. In the next few months Villagra brought an end to the Mapuche revolt north of the Bio-Bio.

== Sources ==
- Alonso de Góngora Marmolejo, Historia de Todas las Cosas que han Acaecido en el Reino de Chile y de los que lo han gobernado (1536-1575) (History of All the Things that Have happened in the Kingdom of Chile and of those that have governed it (1536-1575)), Edición digital a partir de Crónicas del Reino de Chile, Madrid, Atlas, 1960, pp. 75–224, (on line in Spanish)
- Pedro Mariño de Lobera, Crónica del Reino de Chile, escrita por el capitán Pedro Mariño de Lobera....reducido a nuevo método y estilo por el Padre Bartolomé de Escobar. Edición digital a partir de Crónicas del Reino de Chile Madrid, Atlas, 1960, pp. 227-562, (Biblioteca de Autores Españoles; 569-575). Biblioteca Virtual Miguel de Cervantes (on line in Spanish)
- Vicente Carvallo y Goyeneche, Descripcion Histórico Geografía del Reino de Chile (Description Historical Geography of the Kingdom of Chile), PDF E Libros from Memoria Chilena (History of Chile 1542-1788)
  - Tomo I History 1542 - 1626, Tomo 8 de Colección de historiadores de Chile y de documentos relativos a la historia nacional. Santiago : Impr. del Ferrocarril, 1861.
