= South American long peace =

Period of peace in South America since 1884 or 1935

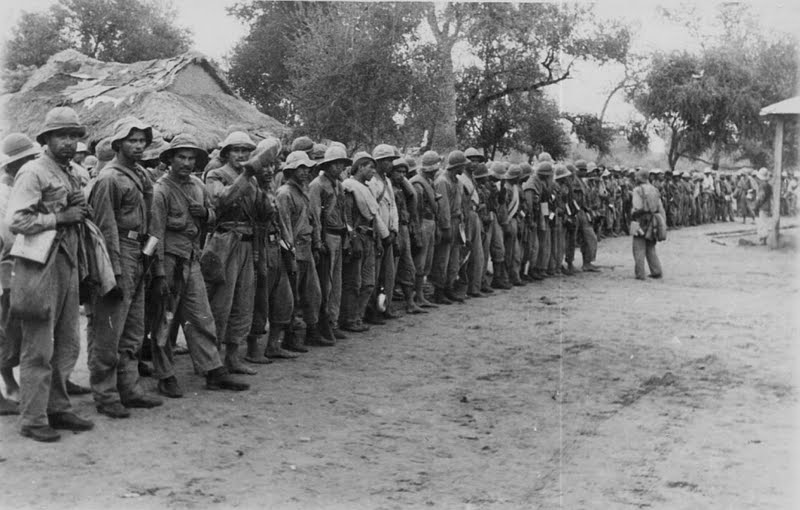
Paraguayan troops in 1932 during the Chaco War

Signatory and member states of the American Treaty on Pacific Settlement (Pact of Bogotá) which was signed in 1948 and which is part of the legal framework of the Organization of American States (OAS). Color legend: States which have ratified the treaty States which have signed but not ratified the treaty States which have neither signed nor ratified the treaty States which have ratified the treaty but denounced its membership

The South American long peace (also referred to as the Latin American long peace) is a term used in international relations and history to describe the relative absence of large-scale interstate war in South America since the end of the Ecuadorian-Peruvian War in 1942. Some accounts also mention the period of peace as beginning in 1884. The region has remained an anomaly in global security studies for its persistent lack of major conventional wars between sovereign states. The region, however, continues to showcase high levels of intra-state violence despite the absence of war among states.

The concept emerged as a regional parallel to John Lewis Gaddis's "Long Peace" (the period of stability between great powers during the Cold War). Scholars such as Nicolás Terradas and Arie Kacowicz argue that South America constitutes a "zone of peace" or a "security community" in which the use of force to settle disputes has become increasingly rare. The contrast is clear when comparing South America with the more war-prone continents of Africa, Asia and Europe.

The "long peace" is usually dated from 1942 to the present. Although the region has witnessed militarised crises (such as the 1981 Paquisha War or the 1995 Cenepa War), these are viewed as low-intensity exceptions that did not escalate into full-scale war or destabilised the regional order. According to Kalevi Holsti the Falklands War of 1982 against the United Kingdom should not be counted as it was fought against a non-South American power.

== Period prior to the long peace ==
The period prior to 1935 and in particular that of the 19th century has been described by scholars as one of balkanisation in South America as most of the then newly formed states found themselves in international war repeatedly through the century. States were often weak, with Argentina only coming into being as proper nation in 1860, and the weakness of Bolivia and Ecuador attracting foreign interference.

The 19th century saw many border disputes in South America. As most states based their border claims on the uti possidetis iuris a source of conflict was the poorly mapped or vagueness of borders inherited forn the Spanish Portuguese colonial eras. This was particularly true for much of Atacama Desert, Patagonia and the Amazon and Orinoco basins. Brazil however tended to apply a different criterion claiming de facto occupation of a territory as basis of claims.

=== Early long peace (1884–1935) ===
In the Pan-American Conference of 1889 arbitration was discussed a favoured way to solve disputes between states in the Americas. In various South American territorial disputes foreign parties were invited to help solve issues, as such Argentina and Chile invited the United States as umpire in 1899 in the Puna de Atacama dispute and decided to let the British Crown arbiter the 1902 Arbitral award of the Andes between Argentina and Chile. Peru proposed in 1898 the King of Spain as arbiter in the Bolivian–Peruvian territorial dispute, albeit this proposal did never materialize.

In 1915 South America's three main regional powers; Argentina, Brazil and Chile signed the ABC Pact to establish the principles of non-aggression, consultation and arbitration in dispute resolution.

It is argued that before 1945 South American countries could enjoy some degree of freedom in their foreign policy by playing great powers against each other. With the rise of the United States' influence after 1945 this option disappeared as invoking its competitor –the Soviet Union– was largely out of question.

== Conceptualizations of peace ==
Scholarship on the South American long peace have framed the stability of peace in South America in different approaches. Traditional views, such as those by Kalevi Holsti, describe South America as a "non-war zone" or a "negative peace," where war is absent but the underlying causes of conflict (border disputes, ideological rivalries) remain unresolved. Jorge Battaglino proposes that South America occupies a "hybrid peace" category. In this state, states may still experience militarised crises and engage in arms races, yet they possess robust diplomatic mechanisms (such as UNASUR) that prevent these tensions from erupting into full-scale war.

A central theme in the literature is the "Latin American paradox"—the coexistence of interstate peace with high levels of intrastate violence. Sabine Kurtenbach notes that while states do not fight each other, the region remains one of the most violent in the world due to homicides, social exclusion, and weak state institutions.

== Proposed causes ==
Scholars have proposed several theories to explain why South American states have avoided major wars. One is that there is a combination of geographic isolation, lack of "great power" ambitions, and a shared diplomatic culture which has sustained peace since at least the 1940s. Another is that there is a shared identity and shared norms. From this follows that there is a role of a diplomatic culture and legalistic traditions (such as uti possidetis) that prioritize sovereignty and territorial integrity over expansionism. A third approach claims there is an institutional constraint against major conflicts. The proliferation of regional organizations has provided forums for mediation, reducing the likelihood of miscalculation during crises. Finally, some argue that South American militaries have historically been more concerned with internal security and regime maintenance (internal enemies) than with external conquest.

One thesis attributes the lack of inter-state war to the dramatic rise of United States as hegemon in the Americas following its 1945 victory in World War II. In reality Bolivia, Colombia, Ecuador, and Peru tended to treat the United States as a hegemon already after World War I seeking its help to solve disputes whenever they thought it benefited them. However analysis of wars and militarized conflicts show no clear decrease in inter-state conflicts as U.S. hegomony was established in South America.

== Limits and criticism ==
Critics of the "long peace" narrative, such as Sabine Kurtenbach, argue that a "minimalist" definition of peace –that is merely the absence of interstate war– ignores the structural violence and "non-war violence" that is common in the region. In this view, the "long peace" may be a facade that hides state failure to protect citizens from internal threats, organised crime, and systemic human rights abuses.

The long peace has not hindered international disputes in the region to attract military involvement.

== Last major war by country ==
The following is a list of the last war with at least 1000 casualties fought by each country in South America against a South American country.

Country	Conflict	End date	Fought against	Result
Argentina	Paraguayan War	1870	Paraguay	Military victory: Machaín-Irigoyen Treaty
Bolivia	Chaco War	1935	Paraguay	Military defeat: Bolivia–Paraguay Treaty of 1938
Brazil	Paraguayan War	1870	Paraguay	Military victory: Loizaga–Cotegipe Treaty
Chile	War of the Pacific	1884	Bolivia; Peru	Military victory: Treaty of Ancón; Treaty of Valparaíso
Colombia	Ecuadorian–Colombian War	1863	Ecuador	Military victory: Pinsaqui Treaty
Ecuador	Ecuadorian-Peruvian War	1942	Peru	Military defeat: Rio protocol
Guyana	Never been at war with another South American country	–	–	–
Paraguay	Chaco War	1935	Bolivia	Military victory: Bolivia–Paraguay Treaty of 1938
Peru	Ecuadorian-Peruvian War	1942	Ecuador	Military victory: Rio protocol
Suriname	Never been at war with another South American country	–	–	–
Uruguay	Paraguayan War	1870	Paraguay	Military victory: Decoud-Kubly Treaty
Venezuela	Never been at war with another South American country	–	–	–

== See also ==
- American Treaty on Pacific Settlement
- 1978 Argentina–Chile crisis
- 2008 Andean diplomatic crisis
- 2023–2024 Guyana–Venezuela crisis
- America's Backyard
- Latin American integration
- Maximum neighbor hypothesis
- Narcoterrorism
- Pan-Americanism
- United States involvement in regime change in Latin America

== Bibliography ==
- Bello Maldonado, Álvaro (2023). "Las fronteras como "espacios conjeturales" sir Thomas H. Holdich y la mirada imperial de la Patagonia (1860-1915)". In Harambour, Alberto; Serje, Margarita (eds.). La Era del Imperio y las Fronteras de la Civilización en América del sur (in Spanish). Bogotá-Santiago: Ediciones UniAndes-Pehuén. pp. 37–65. ISBN 9789587985108.
- Bulcourf, Pablo; López Chorne, Juan; Sasso Videla, Franco (2025). Romero Tarin, Adela (ed.). A Comparative Historical Study of Peacekeeping Actions. Public Policy and Research in Latin Americ. pp. 129–158.
- Holsti, Kalevi J. (1996). The State, War and the State of War. Cambridge Studies in International Relations. Cambridge University Press. doi:10.1017/CBO9780511628306. ISBN 978-0-511-62830-6. S2CID 150457372.
- Mares, D.R. (2001). Violent peace: Militarized interstate bargaining in Latin America. Columbia University Press. doi:10.7312/mare11186.
- Mares, D.R. (2015). "Interstate security issues in Latin America". In Domínguez, J. I.; Covarrubias, A. (eds.). Routledge handbook of Latin American in the world. pp. 420–433.
