= Millalelmo =

Millalelmo or Millarelmo (died 1570) was a Mapuche military leader in the second great Mapuche rebellion that began in 1561 during the Arauco War. Probably the toqui of the Arauco region, he commanded the Mapuche army of that area at the siege of Arauco from May 20 to June 30, 1562.

Later in 1563, he led his army to defeat Captain Juan Perez de Zurita at a crossing of the Andalién River near Concepcion. This cut off reinforcements to the city of Concepcion and led to the 1564 Siege of Concepcion in cooperation with the Mapuche forces from north of the Bio Bio River under the vice toqui Loble. In 1566, Millalemo led the attack on the recently rebuilt Cañete. In 1569, he was a leader under Llanganabal in the Battle of Catirai.

He is said to have died in 1570 and ordered his body to be burned, so that he might rise up into the clouds and keep up the war against the dead Spaniards whom he expected to find there.

== Sources ==
- Alonso de Góngora Marmolejo, Historia de Todas las Cosas que han Acaecido en el Reino de Chile y de los que lo han gobernado (1536-1575) (History of All the Things that Have happened in the Kingdom of Chile and of those that have governed it (1536-1575)), Edición digital a partir de Crónicas del Reino de Chile, Madrid, Atlas, 1960, pp. 75–224, (on line in Spanish)
  - Cap. XXXVI. De cómo Francisco de Villagra envió su hijo Pedro de Villagra a desbaratar un fuerte en compañía del licenciado Altamirano, que era su maestre de campo, y de lo que en la jornada le sucedió
  - Cap. XXXVII. De lo que hizo Francisco de Villagra después que tuvo nueva de la pérdida de Mereguano
  - Cap. XXXIX. De cómo todos los caciques y señores principales de toda la provincia se conjuraron y vinieron sobre la casa fuerte de Arauco, y lo que sucedió
  - Cap. XL. De cómo los indios de toda la provincia se juntaron y vinieron a poner cerco a los cristianos que estaban en el fuerte de Arauco, y de lo que sucedió
  - Cap. LXVI. De lo que hizo el gobernador Saravia después de la pérdida de Catiray
  - Cap. LXVII. De lo que hizo el general Martín Ruiz de Gamboa después que llegó a Cañete, y de lo que le sucedió
- Pedro Mariño de Lobera, Crónica del Reino de Chile, escrita por el capitán Pedro Mariño de Lobera....reducido a nuevo método y estilo por el Padre Bartolomé de Escobar. Edición digital a partir de Crónicas del Reino de Chile Madrid, Atlas, 1960, pp. 227-562, (Biblioteca de Autores Españoles; 569-575). Biblioteca Virtual Miguel de Cervantes (on line in Spanish)
- Diego de Rosales, “Historia General del Reino de Chile”, Flandes Indiano, 3 tomos. Valparaíso 1877 - 1878.
  - Historia general de el Reyno de Chile: Flandes Indiano, Tomo II (1554–1625)
    - CAPÍTULO XLI.
- Guillermo Coz y Méndez, Historia de Concepción, Capítulo IV
- John Augustine Zahm, Through South America's Southland: With an Account of the Roosevelt Scientific Expedition to South America, D. Appleton and Company, 1916, 526 pages Original from Harvard University, Digitized May 14, 2007
