= Juan Pérez de Zurita =

Spanish conquistador

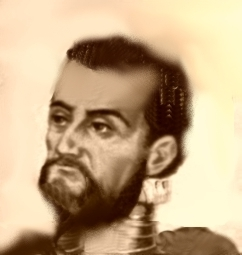
Juan Pérez de Zurita

Juan Pérez de Zurita (1516 – c. 1595) was a Spanish conquistador, the son of Alonso Díaz de Zurita, native of Cañete de las Torres and Inés Fernández de Córdova. In 1536 he began his military career. In 1548 he was in Granada and in 1550 he embarked to the Indies with his brother Alonso de Zurita. In 1553 went on to the kingdom of Peru. At the beginning of 1557, by order of the Viceroy Hurtado de Mendoza he was sent with an expedition of 700 soldiers under the command of his son García Hurtado de Mendoza, to Chile. From there by order of the new Governor Mendoza, he was sent with a command of 70 men with the position of Lieutenant Governor and Greater Justice for the province of Tucuman, Juries and Diaguitas. He crossed the Andes Mountains and arrived at Santiago del Estero in May 1558.

== Biography ==
Zurita relieved Juan Gregorio Bazán the chief of the few soldiers or colonists who remained in the province, that was torn by discord and afflicted by crime continuing a precarious existence after the departure of the previous governor. With a new immigration from Chile and Peru, Zurita at the head of the government was able to bring the settlers a larger measure of prosperity than they had previously enjoyed and treated all parties with equal justice. In honour of the union of Philip II and Queen Mary, Zurita changed the name of the province to Nueva Inglaterra (New England). He also founded three towns: Londres (later known as Catamarca), Canete, and Cordova. Zurita continued the task of subjugating the Diaguita and Calchaquí Indians with some success.

When Diego López de Zúñiga y Velasco, arrived in Peru as the new Viceroy in 1560, he was determined to make the province of Tucuman independent, except as subordinated to the viceroy of Peru. This proposed change provoked a revolt on the part of those who wished to maintain the connection with Chile. Londres inhabitants led this movement, reinforced by the garrison of the town, who went over to them. The uprising was suppressed, but opposition aroused by Zurita finally persuaded the Governor of Chile that it was desirable to transfer the affairs of the province of Tucuman to other hands. Gregorio Castañeda was, therefore, sent to supersede Zurita.

Zurita was transferred, against his will, back to Chile, but rendered service to the governors Don Pedro de Villagra and don Rodrigo de Quiroga in the Arauco War. At first he underestimated the Mapuche and his column of reinforcements from Angol for Concepcion was ambushed by Millalelmo and 3000 Mapuche at the Andalién River in 1564. He managed to escape annihilation and get back to Santiago, Chile. Following the Mapuche's failed Siege of Concepcion he joined Governor Villagra in the Second Battle of Reinohuelén and Battle of Tulmillán ending the revolt of the Mapuche north of the Bío Bío River.

== Family ==
In 1571, the Viceroy of Peru, Don Francisco de Toledo, gave permission for him to found two settlements in the government of Santa Cruz de la Sierra. He was married with Jerónima de Mena y Saldaña. He died in La Plata in the year 1595.
