= Siege of Concepción =

1564 siege

Coordinates: 36.83333°S 73.05°W

Siege of Concepcion
- Part of Arauco War
Date	February 1 - April 1, 1564
Location	Vicinity of Concepcion, Chile
Result	Spanish victory

Belligerents
Spanish Empire	Mapuches

Commanders and leaders
Pedro de Villagra	Loble; Millalelmo

Strength
200 soldiers, 6 cannon and citizens and indios amigos of Concepcion.	20,000 warriors

Casualties and losses
?	?

During the siege of Concepcion of the Arauco War, 20,000 warriors of the army of the Mapuche laid siege to the Spanish garrison and civil population in the fortress of Concepcion, Chile.

== History ==
In early 1564, Spanish governor Pedro de Villagra was taking measures to protect all the towns and forts he already held against the growing Mapuche revolt and to organize a field army in Concepcion. He knew that one of the Mapuche objectives was to surround Concepcion, and preparations were made to support a long siege.

Raids by Mapuche bands had made it unsafe for Spaniards to go farther than a league from the city. After a brief fight, 3,000 Mapuche in the Itata River valley under Loble defeated the troops of captain Francisco de Vaca coming with reinforcements from Santiago. Meanwhile, another 3,000 warriors under Millalelmo defeated the troops coming from Angol under captain Juan Perez de Zurita, at a crossing of the Andalién River two leagues from Concepcion. Both defeats had reduced the garrison of Concepcion to defensive measures and cut off Concepcion from aid by land. The survivors of the two battles had to retreat to Santiago and were in no condition to break through the investment around Concepcion.

Meanwhile, the caciques Millalelmu and Loble with 20,000 warriors from the area between the Itata and Bio-Bio rivers, had looted and destroyed Spanish estancias in the vicinity of Concepcion, took their herds, and then settled down to besiege Concepcion in early February 1564. The Mapuche entered the city, sacking and burning it, the population crowding within the walls of its fortress with its 200-man garrison under governor Pedro de Villagra. The Mapuche then built a fortified camp on heights overlooking the city from which they descended to attack it.

The siege lasted two months with continuous skirmishes. At the end of March two Spanish ships arrived bringing food that permitted the population to continue to withstand the siege for a much longer time. On the other side the Mapuche had used up local sources of food, and without pack animals and transport vehicles were finding it difficult to bring in enough to maintain their large force. Also the harvest season was coming and failure to bring in the crops would result in a winter of hunger for their families. With the recent news of the defeat of the Mapuche toqui Illangulién at the Battle of Angol, they were also nervous that their undefended homes might be attacked from Angol or Santiago. On the first of April the Mapuche army raised the siege and dispersed to their homes for the winter.

== Additional information ==
=== Sources ===
- Alonso de Góngora Marmolejo, Historia de Todas las Cosas que han Acaecido en el Reino de Chile y de los que lo han gobernado (1536-1575) (History of All the Things that Have happened in the Kingdom of Chile and of those that have governed it (1536-1575)), Edición digital a partir de Crónicas del Reino de Chile, Madrid, Atlas, 1960, pp. 75–224, (on line in Spanish)
  - Capítulo XLVII, De cómo los indios de la comarca y término de la Concepción vinieron a ponelle cerco estando el gobernador Pedro de Villagra en ella, y de las cosas que acaescieron
- Pedro Mariño de Lobera, Crónica del Reino de Chile, escrita por el capitán Pedro Mariño de Lobera....reducido a nuevo método y estilo por el Padre Bartolomé de Escobar. Edición digital a partir de Crónicas del Reino de Chile Madrid, Atlas, 1960, pp. 227-562, (Biblioteca de Autores Españoles; 569-575). Biblioteca Virtual Miguel de Cervantes (on line in Spanish),
  - Libro segundo, Capítulo XXIII, Del cerco que los indios de Arauco y Penco pusieron a la ciudad de la Concepción, y desbarataron a dos capitanes con muerte de don Pedro de Godoy, caballero sevillano
- Diego Barros Arana, Historia General De Chile, Tomo Segundo, SANTIAGO, RAFAEL JOVER, 1884.
