= Revolt of the Comuneros (Paraguay) =

Series of uprisings by settlers in Paraguay

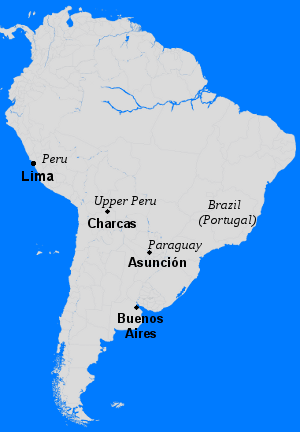
Notable cities in the Viceroyalty of Peru during the revolt, which centered in Asunción.

The Revolt of the Comuneros (Spanish: Revolución Comunera) was a series of uprisings by settlers in Paraguay in the Viceroyalty of Peru against the Spanish authorities from 1721 to 1725 and 1730–1735. The underlying cause of the unrest was strong anti-Jesuit feelings among the Paraguayans and dislike for any governor seen as favoring the Jesuits. In the resumption of the revolt in 1730, economic issues came to fore as well. The rebel organization split in its second phase, as the rural poor and the urban elite each formed their own factions with similar grievances against the Jesuits, but incompatible politics. Paraguay had an unusually strong tradition of self-rule; the colonists did not have a tradition of strict obedience to everything the Spanish Crown's governor decreed. This independence helped push the revolt forward.

The beginnings of the revolt were quasi-legal at first. José de Antequera y Castro (1690–1731), a judge for the Real Audiencia of Charcas, was sent to Asunción in 1721 to examine charges of misconduct against pro-Jesuit Governor Diego de los Reyes Balmaseda. Antequera concluded the charges were valid, forced Reyes into exile and later imprisoned him, and declared himself governor by the power of the Audencia in 1722. Antequera also accused the Jesuits of various crimes, demanded that the mission Indians under their care be enslaved and distributed to the citizens of Paraguay, and expelled the Jesuits from their college in Asunción. All these actions had the support of the citizens of Asunción, and governors had been deposed and replaced before without the central government complaining. However, Viceroy of Peru Diego Morcillo, residing in Lima, did not approve of Antequera's action and ordered Reyes' restoration as governor. With the backing of the settlers, Antequera refused, citing the authority of the Audencia as superior to that of the Viceroy. The feud between Antequera and the Viceroyalty continued after Viceroy Morcillo was replaced by the Marquis of Castelfuerte as Viceroy of Peru. Antequera's Paraguayan militia attacked and defeated an allied force of Jesuit mission Indians and Spanish colonial forces during the standoff. The battle tainted the legitimacy of Antequera's claim of governorship, however, and a second force was sent by Castelfuerte against a movement now seen as clearly treasonous. Antequera resigned in 1725 and fled to Charcas, while order was seemingly restored in the province. Antequera was arrested, imprisoned for five years at Lima, and executed.

Paraguay was quiet for 5 years under interim governor Martín de Barúa, seen as friendly to the settlers and hostile to the Jesuits. When he was replaced by Ignacio de Soroeta, however, Paraguay refused its new governor. Fernando de Mompox y Zayas had spread ideas among the populace that the power of the people - the común - was superior to that of the governor and even the King. The comuneros held new elections to the town council of Asunción, won the seats, and resumed self-rule. A replacement governor sent in 1732, Agustín de Ruyloba, was killed by the comuneros. However, the comunero movement split several times. The notables of Asunción, who had been happy to defy the colonial authorities when the town council was run by them, now feared the total breakdown of order, as the poorer Paraguayans started to loot the estates and property of any notable not thought to be sufficiently pro-comunero. The inability of Asunción to trade with the rest of the Spanish Empire led to an economic crisis, as well. When colonial forces finally moved on Asunción, the divided comuneros scattered and fled, with most of the Asunción faction joining the government forces in a bid for clemency.

== Background ==
=== A tradition of self-government ===
Paraguay was one of the most loosely controlled parts of the Spanish Empire by the Crown, with a strong independent streak in its leadership. This partially stemmed from a quirk of history in 1537. Shortly after the first settlements on the Rio de la Plata were made, Governor Pedro de Mendoza died. The crown subsequently issued a Royal Decree (Cédula Real), which stated that if Mendoza had named a successor, that successor was confirmed as governor. However, if Mendoza had not named a successor—or the successor was dead—a replacement should be "peaceably elected." An election was a unique privilege in Spain's American colonies; historian Adalberto López calls it "strange" as King Charles V was a ruthless centralizer who spent much of his reign curtailing the autonomy of Spain's various holdings, especially since Paraguay was still thought to hold precious metals at the time. A further oddity is that the decree did not limit the use of election to a one-time exigency. The citizens of Paraguay used the decree to elect a governor, and would use it many more times to not merely elect replacement governors, but also to depose disliked appointed governors. The decree of 1537 was used again in 1544 to justify a coup against Álvar Núñez Cabeza de Vaca, who had reigned as governor for only two years. Cabeza de Vaca had attempted to control the settlers' abuse of the native Indians, earning him the dislike of many of the colonists. He was arrested, a replacement governor was proclaimed, and he was sent back to Spain in chains with a number of likely false crimes accused of him. Some Paraguayan historians would later attempt to tie this 1544 coup to the Revolt of the Comuneros in Castile from 1520 to 1521 and call this the "First Revolt of the Comuneros of Paraguay." While Cabeza de Vaca had been part of the royalist forces in that earlier struggle and had helped defeat the Castilian comuneros, it is unlikely that contemporary Paraguayans identified themselves with the Castilian comuneros, according to López. As the plotters hoped to attain legitimacy for their choice of governor in the eyes of the king, identifying themselves with despised rebels would have been counterproductive. Rather, the main contemporary references to the Paraguayans calling themselves comuneros come from sources friendly to Cabeza de Vaca seeking to discredit the coup in the eyes of the king.

Governors in office were more constrained than elsewhere in the Spanish Empire. Unpopular governors faced the threat of being removed through the application of the Decree of 1537; but even when such drastic measures were not used, the governor's power was curtailed. The cabildo (town council) of Asunción was powerful, and governors often found it difficult for their edicts to be enforced or obeyed if they acted without consulting the cabildo and securing its consent. Spain contributed relatively little in the way of troops, officials, funds, or armaments to Paraguay, and after it was determined that the region was not in fact rich in precious metals or other resources, immigration slowed. However, the interior of South America was dangerous, with Portuguese-aligned slavers and hostile Indian tribes to threaten the Paraguayans. Paraguay fended for itself with an armed militia. This also limited the governor's influence, as it was the members of the cabildo who rallied the militia.

=== The Jesuit missions ===
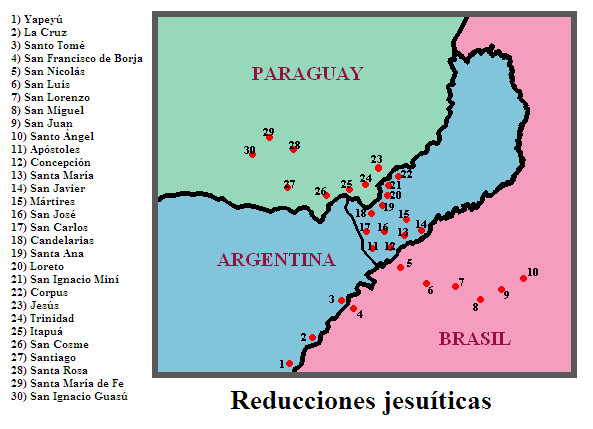
The Jesuit missions were concentrated in the modern border regions between Paraguay, Argentina, and Brazil. At the time, the entire area was ruled by the Viceroyalty of Peru.

In 1588, the first missionaries from the Society of Jesus arrived in Asunción at the invitation of the settlers and the governor. They set to work at converting the Indians in the area. They also built a prominent church and college; the college was the only educational institution of any importance in the province. The Jesuits gathered a large number of Indians under their care, where they were able to go about Christianizing them and introducing the Indians to elements of Spanish civilization. Most importantly, the Jesuits were able to offer Indians under their care a measure of protection against other whites. Indians on their mission would not be sold into slavery, tricked out of their goods, or have their women taken for extra wives. Over time, an entire "empire within an empire" was built up, and the Jesuits took on responsibilities far beyond religious education. In order to pay royal taxes for the Indians, the Jesuits ran an economy and sold goods at market. In order to defend against Portuguese slavers and hostile Indians, the Jesuits gathered armaments and trained in the arts of war. This arming of mission Indians with firearms was highly controversial and was opposed by the Paraguayan settlers, but the constant threat of Portuguese invasion meant the Spanish Crown gave its consent, seeing the Jesuits as defenders of the border.

As time went on, relations between the settlers and the Jesuits soured. The native population of the Guaraní Indians, initially large compared to the number of Spanish settlers, decreased greatly. In part this was due to the abuse and overwork engendered by the encomienda system, a legal framework similar to slavery, and in part due to the Spanish laws that declared the offspring of Spaniards and their Guaraní wives to be Spaniards themselves and thus entitled to their own native slaves under encomienda. As immigration slowed, the province became heavily populated by Spanish-Guaraní mestizo (mixed blood) descendants, who, due to the increasing unavailability of pure-blood Guarani to claim as servants, became a new class of "poor whites." Meanwhile, the Guaraní on the Jesuit missions were flourishing, and many Guaraní actively chose mission life over remaining independent or risking falling into the encomienda system. The result was a perceived "shortage" of cheap encomienda labor—a shortage that could be fixed if the Jesuit mission Indians were taken and impressed into the encomienda. Additionally, the Jesuit missions were an economic competitor to Paraguay's settlers, as both's major export was yerba mate used for the production of the caffeinated drink mate. The variety of yerba produced in the mission lands (yerba caaminí) was considered superior to the yerba harvested in the civil province (yerba de palos), reducing the Paraguayans' revenue even further. Since the mission lands were closed off to almost all Paraguayans, wild rumors about Jesuit activities within them found easy currency among the Paraguayans. Tales of hidden great treasures and secret lucrative mines worked by captive Indians were not uncommon.

By the early 1600s, the average Paraguayan despised the Jesuits. Some agitated for the government to take action against them, and at the very least the idea of extending further "privileges" was out of the question. A series of intrigues took place from 1640 to 1650 with pro-Jesuit governor Gregorio de Hinestrosa vying against the anti-Jesuit Bishop Bernardino de Cárdenas, a Franciscan. Cárdenas was exiled to Corrientes, but upon the end of Hinestrosa's governorship returned to Asunción. The new governor Diego de Escobar y Osorio attempted to remain neutral in the conflict between the Jesuits and the settlers who were now backed by the returned Cárdenas, and successfully avoided bloodshed for a time, but in 1649 Osorio died. The cabildo, seizing on the Decree of 1537, promptly elected Cárdenas the new governor, and with his support expelled the Jesuits from their college in Asunción. They wrote in explanation of their actions that the Jesuits were destroying the province, and it was the "natural right" of people to defend themselves against aggression. Governor-Bishop Cárdenas, in similar proto-democratic language, said "the voice of the People is the voice of God." The authorities were displeased, and the Jesuits, with the government's permission, sent in an army of mission Indians to depose Cárdenas. Cárdenas and the Paraguayan militia decided to resist, and in a battle on October 5, 1649, the Jesuit army of roughly 700 Indians won a complete victory. The Paraguayans were scattered, Cárdenas and his closest supporters were arrested, and the citizens of Asunción were subjected to the humiliation of an occupying army of Indians patrolling their streets and enforcing the new governor's rule. This wound never healed. By 1721, hatred of the Jesuits was even more intense than it was in the early 1600s.

== 1721-1725: Antequera's contested governorship ==
The Audiencia of Charcas in Upper Peru had power over the central area of the Viceroyalty of Peru, including Paraguay.

In 1717, Diego de los Reyes Balmaseda became governor of Paraguay. He purchased the position from the Spanish authorities, a practice that had spread at the time. Reyes was a merchant who had made his fortune trading exporting yerba mate from Paraguay and importing various cheap and needed manufactures back to Paraguay, so he was seen as qualified for the post by the Spanish Crown. Reyes was an open admirer of the Jesuits. Two of his wife's uncles were members of the Jesuit order, and several of his most important advisors were Jesuits. His policies were also seen by the settlers as pro-Jesuit. Reyes' Jesuit advisors instigated him to order an attack on the Payaguá Indians of the Chaco despite a tenuous truce established three years earlier in 1717; all of the captured Payaguás were remitted to the Jesuits for conversion to Christianity and mission life. The settlers received none of the captives for the encomienda, although it had been the settler militia that risked their lives fighting the Payaguás and colonial trade and outlying farms would now be threatened by retaliatory Payaguá raids. The Payaguás, who lived in the Gran Chaco, were considerably less likely to threaten the Jesuits, with their missions farther to the east of the civil province of Paraguay. Reyes acquired a reputation for enriching himself using the powers of his office to control trade. Reyes also taxed important members of the Paraguayan elite to fund the construction of defensive fortifications. The result was that Reyes was a deeply unpopular governor who found the majority of the cabildo of Asunción actively seeking his removal. In a bid to keep his position, Reyes accused his chief antagonists of treason and had them imprisoned. The notables of Asunción complained to the Real Audiencia of Charcas, accusing Reyes both of imprisoning the cabildo members without good cause, as well as general unlawful conduct as governor.

The Audiencia of Charcas took up the investigation of Reyes. The Audencias, the judicial system of colonial Spain, had a wide degree of latitude and independence from the viceroy. Charcas (now known as Sucre) was quite distant from the viceregal capital of Lima, amplifying the court's power even further. In 1721, the audiencia sent judge José de Antequera y Castro to Asunción to dispense justice as he saw fit. Antequera was a young rising star of the court, and even his fiercest critics wrote that he was likable, handsome, intelligent, and unusually well-educated for the time. The Audiencia gave Antequera a sealed document to open if he found Reyes guilty. Reyes arrived in Asunción on July 23, 1721. The Audiencia and Antequera ordered Reyes to release the council members he had imprisoned and that he not interfere in the investigation in any way. After interviewing the witnesses accusing Reyes of misdeeds, Antequera concluded that the evidence was so strong as to warrant the immediate arrest of Reyes in September 1721. Antequera presented to the cabildo the sealed document he'd been given by the Audiencia. The document gave Antequera the position of governor, which he took over the objections of Reyes' remaining supporters. In April 1722, Antequera officially found Reyes guilty and dismissed him as governor, although Reyes immediately escaped Asunción on the same day the sentence was handed down. Antequera proceeded to impound much of Reyes' property and also order the arrest of many of Reyes' friends and supporters, taking their property to be sold at public auction as well. With all these actions, Antequera earned the support and adulation of the majority of the province, though he was hated by those who had done well under Reyes. Antequera clinched his popularity by taking a stand against the hated Jesuits; he endorsed settlers' demands that the mission Indians be distributed to the encomienda, that secular (paid by the Spanish government) priests be put in charge of the Jesuit missions, and that a customs house be established to enforce limits on Jesuit exports of yerba mate. To historian James Saeger, Antequera comes across as mostly well-meaning; he sincerely believed imposing the civil authority upon the independent Jesuit missions would benefit the Empire.

It is quite possible that the matter would have ended with Antequera's succession to Governor of Paraguay until a new royal governor was appointed for the province. However, friends of Reyes reached Lima, where they pleaded their case to the Viceregal court. With the support of the influential Jesuits, they convinced Viceroy of Peru Diego Morcillo that Reyes was the victim of a plot by jealous Paraguayans and an ambitious Antequera. Viceroy Morcillo conducted a stormy correspondence with the Audencia of Charcas, accusing them of having overstepped their authority and that giving the chief judge of the case against Reyes the power to succeed him as governor was illegal. On three separate occasions from 1721 to 1723 he demanded the reinstatement of Reyes as governor. The Audencia responded that this was a judicial matter, and the Viceroy was the one overstepping his bounds. The Jesuits held a ceremony proclaiming the escaped Reyes as the legitimate governor. Reyes also went to Corrientes, where the authorities recognized his claim and began impounding carts & goods of traders who refused to support Reyes' claim. Trade between Paraguay and the rest of the Spanish Empire was interrupted. The situation degenerated further after a group of men loyal to Antequera came to Corrientes and kidnapped Reyes in the night, dragging him back to Asunción—a highly illegal act in the eyes of the citizens of Corrientes and the Viceroy, as the government of Paraguay had no lawful power in Corrientes. Enraged, the Viceroy finally opted for military force, ordering Governor Zavala of Buenos Aires to prepare an army to march on Asunción to depose Antequera.

Antequera rallied the Paraguayan militia in response, while Zavala sent his lieutenant governor Baltasar García Ros to marshal both Jesuit mission Indians, his own troops from Buenos Aires, and reinforcements from Villa Rica. Zavala had hoped a peaceful resolution might still be possible, but García Ros was not well received by the Paraguayans. He had briefly served as interim governor of Paraguay from 1706 to 1707, and was known to be a great supporter of the Jesuits. He had worked with the Jesuit armies of mission Indians before in fighting the Portuguese, where the Jesuits gained his admiration with their support; he had also allegedly ignored a royal award of 300 mission Indians to the settlers in the encomienda while interim governor to please the Jesuits. Meanwhile, in Asunción, the Jesuits were run out of their college by a mob of citizens, and given 3 hours to leave by the cabildo. The armies exchanged hostile letters, and it seemed briefly that a show of force might persuade the other side to back down. On August 25, 1724, the Paraguayans misinterpreted Indians celebrating the feast of St. Luis as preparations for a military attack. (Note: Sources differ, however. Both sides portray themselves as acting in self-defense in their own documents, and the other as the ones initiating hostilities. The cabildo's documents say that it was not a misinterpretation, and the mission Guaraní were indeed advancing to attack, not celebrating a feast, while the Jesuit documents from Pedro Lozano say it was just a parade and celebration.) The Paraguayans attacked the dancing and parading Indians, and won a complete victory with the element of surprise. Hundreds of Indians were killed, all of the arms, ammunition, and papers were taken, and the royal army was forced into full retreat. A band of citizens of Villa Rica who arrived late as reinforcements surrendered immediately, and saw their leader executed. The victory came unexpectedly cheap, as well; only five settlers were killed, and 20 wounded. 150 captured mission Indians were distributed to the settlers in encomienda servitude.

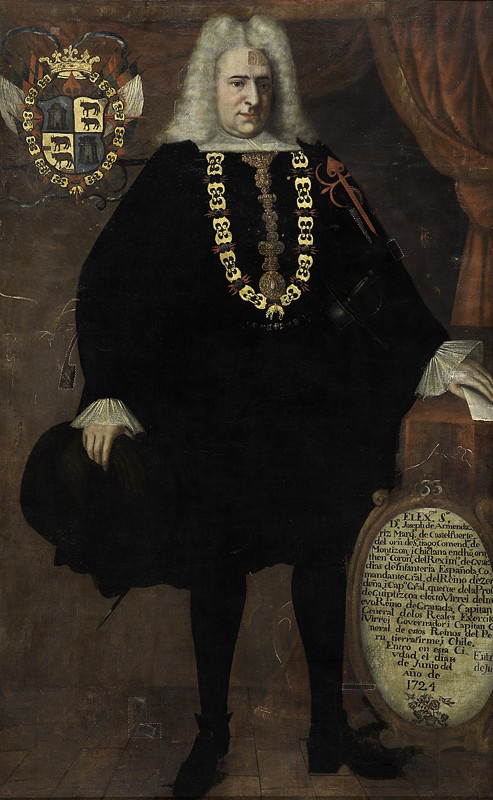
The new Viceroy of Peru, the Marquis of Castelfuerte, took an even stronger line against the rebellion than the previous Viceroy.

The Paraguayan's victory was fleeting, however. The new Viceroy of Peru, the Marquis of Castelfuerte, was a dedicated supporter of absolutist monarchy who was not about to allow disobedience to the lawful authorities to linger and spread. The Audencia of Charcas was sent a final warning that continuing to meddle in the Paraguayan affair would not be tolerated; perhaps frightened by both the new Viceroy's connections in Spain as well as Antequera's battle against the Spanish forces, the Audencia backed down and ceased to campaign on Antequera's behalf. A second expedition was organized by Zavala personally, with more forces, while the bishop of Asunción, who had never supported Antequera, implored the cabildo in the strongest of terms to back down and accept Zavala without a fight. The stronger force made it clear that continuing to struggle would be fruitless. Zavala additionally guaranteed that the Jesuit mission Indians would not enter the civil territory this time if the settlers submitted peacefully. Zavala made no mention of retribution or arrests, as well. The cabildo decided to submit to Zavala; Antequera fled to Charcas, where he was arrested.

== 1725-1730: A temporary peace ==
Zavala pursued a conciliatory policy with the Paraguayan settlers, not wishing to aggravate the situation. Reprimands were handed down, but few fines, and no arrests, exiles, or executions. Members of the cabildo kept their posts. Ill and emaciated, former governor Reyes was quietly freed from more than a year in conditions that approached solitary confinement, but told that to avoid trouble it would be best if he never showed himself in the province again. Zavala left after only two months in Asunción, placing Martín de Barúa in charge as interim governor. Barúa would serve as governor until 1730, as the first two replacement governors failed to arrive in Asunción; one was arrested after he beat his wife, and the other died in transit in the Atlantic Ocean. Barúa proved sympathetic to the settlers and hostile to the Jesuits; he sent letters to the Jesuits threatening to investigate claimed abuses of the mission Indians, and also wrote the Viceroy with similar concerns about the Jesuit missions. He assured the Viceroy that the Paraguayans were loyal servants of the Crown, and that the burden of defending Paraguay against hostile Indian raids would be lessened if the Jesuits were to share their mission Indians with the encomienda.

The main dispute of Barúa's tenure was the return of the Jesuits to their college in Asunción. The Viceroy had ordered the Jesuits to be restored, but Zavala had not immediately complied for fear of re-igniting the revolt, and Barúa and the settlers were actively hostile to the Jesuits' return. Barúa procrastinated on implementing the Viceroy's orders as letters were exchanged; it was not until extremely blunt orders demanding the immediate reinstatement of the Jesuits with all the pomp and solemnity required for the occasion came that Barúa complied in 1728. The antagonism continued, however. In 1730, Governor Barúa and the Jesuits traded accusations of malfeasance on the Jesuit lands in reports sent to Madrid.

Barúa also invited the traveling orator Fernando de Mompox y Zayas to be one of his advisors in 1730. Mompox's origins are cloudy, but he was educated and quite possibly a lawyer. He had acquired a reputation as a troublemaker in Lima. Mompox was imprisoned there, possibly meeting Antequera in prison, but at some point either escaped or was exiled. He eventually made his way to Paraguay, where he spread his ideas about government and the role of the people, which were considered radical at the time. According to Mompox, the Paraguayans had been within their rights when they overthrew Reyes and defied García Ros; political authority rested on the assent of the común, the community. The power of the people, Mompox said, was greater than even the King or the Pope.

== 1730-1735: The comuneros ==
In late 1730, news came to Paraguay that a third replacement governor was on the way, Ignacio de Soroeta. Rumors spread that Soroeta was a friend of the Jesuits and Reyes. Mompox rallied his followers, called the comuneros, and raised a force of 300 outside the city. A delegation of the comuneros sent to the cabildo demanded that the new governor be denied entry. Barúa demanded that the comuneros disband; when they refused, he resigned his post in frustration. The comuneros demanded new elections of the cabildo, which, unsurprisingly, they won. Only those members who had accepted the rebel line were re-elected, while the other cabildo members were replaced by comuneros. When Soroeta arrived, he was informed he was not wanted, and only allowed to stay in Asunción for four days under virtual house arrest. Convinced there was nothing to be done, Soroeta left; Barúa and Bishop Palos of Asunción also left. The city was entirely under comunero control. Despite the new comunero influence on the cabildo, Mompox desired an even more radical shift. He apparently felt that he could not abolish the cabildo directly; instead, he created his own parallel governmental structure, the Junta Gobernativa, whose members were elected by the people.

However, this was a step too far toward treason for some members of the cabildo whom Mompox had assumed would have been compliant. The new mayor of Asunción, José Luis Barreyro (Bareiro), built his own power base in Asunción as the comuneros splintered and factionalized. Mompox's faction of the comuneros controlled the rural areas, and Barreyro's faction saw him as a threat. Barreyo arranged the quiet arrest of Mompox while he was alone and sent him to the Jesuits, from whom he eventually found his way to a jail in Buenos Aires. Mompox would soon escape prison again, but rather than return to Paraguay he fled to Brazil. Barreyro's victory was short-lived; while Mompox's faction of the comuneros were thrown into confusion for several months, they eventually rallied, and he found few Asunción militia members willing to fight against them. Barreyro and his supporters were forced to flee to the Jesuit missions, and the more radical comuneros once again ruled both Asunción and the rural areas.

News of the refusal of Governor Soroeta reached Lima, which doomed the defense of the imprisoned Antequera. Convinced that Antequera was behind the new uprising, the trial was accelerated, and Antequera was sentenced to death. The Franciscans, friendly to Antequera, organized a mob shouting for his pardon and blocked the way to the public execution site on July 5, 1731, so Antequera was shot instead on the way there. The execution of Antequera disheartened some of the leading citizens of Asunción, because not only was Antequera executed, but also one of his allies who had been considerably less involved, perhaps implying a forthcoming purge of any of Antequera's supporters. Settler-Jesuit relations now collapsed again. The Jesuits had rallied an Indian army, but not crossed the Tebicuary River to the settler lands, and had assured the settlers it was only for self-defense. While the Jesuit college had been ignored in the earlier stages of the comunero affair, now the comuneros expelled the Jesuits from their Asunción college yet again. Enraged at this interference with the church, the Bishop of Asunción placed the province under the interdict and excommunicated the rebels for the sack of the Jesuits' church, although this was temporarily lifted when a band of colonists were needed to fight the Payaguá Indians. The comunero army and the Jesuit army of Indians came close to clashing, but after a tense series of communications, both backed off and agreed to a truce.

The position of Governor of Paraguay still sat vacant. While the Viceroy of Peru selected a favored candidate whom he believed could restore order to the province, he was unknowingly pre-empted by the King, who selected Agustín de Ruyloba to be the new Governor of Paraguay. While Ruyloba was given a force of 300 soldiers by Governor Zavala in Buenos Aires, he left it behind, choosing to believe the promises the Paraguayans sent of their loyalty to the King. He arrived in Asunción, was accepted by the cabildo as the new governor, and declared in a speech that the establishment of the Junta Gobernativa had been treason, and anyone attempting to revive it would be publicly executed. Ruyloba waited three weeks assessing the situation, then began to dispense the justice that the Viceroy had ordered. All elections to the cabildo since 1730 were declared invalid, and the cabildo and leadership of the militia was purged. Ruyloba also began preparations for the return of the Jesuits to their college in Asunción. This was acting far too confidently and fast for the citizens of Asunción; Ruyloba's thin support as governor collapsed, and the comuneros began to rally in the countryside again, with Ruyloba largely oblivious. When Ruyloba learnt about the comunero army, he rallied the Asunción militia to ride and meet it, but found his own army deserting him en masse, unwilling to fight their countrymen. Ruyloba met with the rebel leaders, and was advised to agree to at least some changes by the priest Arregui, known to be sympathetic to both sides. Ruyloba refused to make any concessions. For honor's sake, Ruyloba still took the field with his pistol afterward, despite having almost his entire army desert, and was killed in a brief battle with the rebels.

The comuneros promptly rode to Asunción, reinstated the Junta, declared all of Ruyloba's acts invalid, and looted the properties of Ruyloba's supporters. They also elected the eighty-year-old Bishop Juan de Arregui of Buenos Aires as a figurehead governor. The government of Asunción split into three: the old official rulership structure headed by Arregui which was largely a rubber stamp, but provided a cloak of legitimacy; the city leadership, dominated by the rich families which had avoided being looted for being insufficiently pro-comunero; and the countryside comuneros, who were the most influenced by Mompó's philosophy of self-governance. As far as the Asunción faction was concerned, the goal of the revolt had been achieved with Ruyloba's death, and business as usual could resume with a hopefully more pliant governor. However, the poor rural comuneros were not finished with the revolt. The war became a war of the poor against the rich; the ranches of the wealthy were raided, shipments of yerba mate were impounded, and cattle were stolen. The leaders of the countryside were considered illiterate political nonentities by the notables of Asunción, "rural barbarians" according to one account, who could not be contained once unleashed. People who dared speak out against them, especially in the countryside, were killed. Commerce came to a standstill as both sides refused to allow trade; the Junta would not allow anyone to leave without their permission on pain of death, and Zavala had blockaded the province. As the economic crisis deepened, the cabildo of Asunción not only completely broke with the Junta, but became prepared to fight it themselves, seeing them as having sunk to countryside bandits.

The expected colonial armed response was delayed due to a number of factors, most notably a famine and plague that struck the Jesuit missions which made mobilizing their army difficult. By 1735, however, Zavala was ready to move in once more. While some comuneros rallied an army as a show of force, no battles were actually fought; without the support of Asunción, and against an experienced campaigner with superior forces, the comunero armies melted and their soldiers tried to escape. Zavala's army retook Asunción. Unlike his previous occupation of Asunción, this time Zavala sought to suppress any future revolt with sterner reprisals. Many of the ringleaders of the Asunción faction were arrested regardless despite their late support for the royal army; there was a series of exiles and executions. All of the actions of the cabildo since the death of Ruyloba were declared null and void, as were any actions of the Junta. Zavala declared that since the Royal Decree of 1537 was not mentioned in the 1680 publishing of "Laws of the Kingdoms of the Indies" (Recopilación de Leyes de las Indias), it was no longer valid and any attempt to elect a governor again would be treason. In October, the Jesuits were once again returned to their college in Asunción.

== Later influence ==
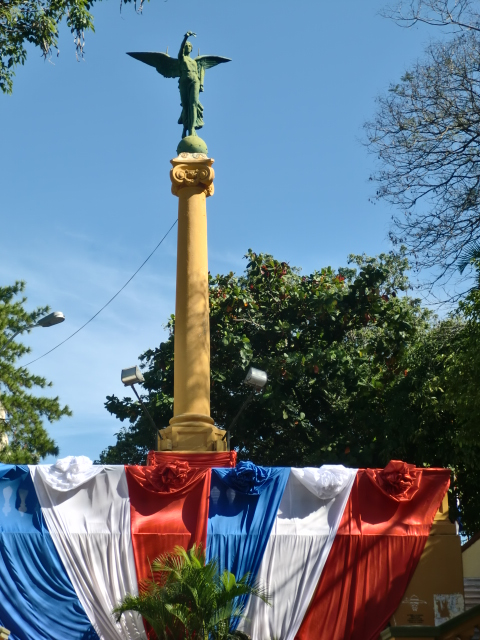
Monument to the Comuneros & Antequera in Asunción

While some of the ideologies of self-government espoused by the comuneros seem to prefigure later democratic uprisings against Spanish colonial rule, especially among the rural branch of the revolt, historians Adalberto López and James Schofield Saeger caution that giving this apparent resemblance too much weight would be a mistake. According to Saegar, the revolt was much closer to traditions of the 16th and 17th centuries and "was principally a local uprising led by local vested interest groups and unrelated to the important changes in the Spanish empire beginning in the 18th century." It had little in common with the Revolt of the Comuneros of New Granada or the Rebellion of Túpac Amaru II that occurred in the 1780s. López agrees that the Revolt of the Comuneros was not a "true revolution" that aimed at fundamental change in Paraguay; most of the Paraguayans saw themselves as loyal servants of the Crown and were not attempting to fundamentally change the political or economic structure of the province. Rather, they were attempting to assert control over the Jesuits, who were seen as undermining the province and exacerbating its poverty.

Paraguay remained poor and somewhat discontented after the revolt was suppressed. Higher taxes imposed later further squeezed the region's export income, and the Jesuit missions continued to be a hated competitor driving down prices of the Paraguayan's cash crop. Antequera became a folk hero and martyr. The new cabildo, attempting to suppress talk of him, unwisely ordered the public burning of all "dangerous" documents in the city archives in 1740. A would-be coup against the governor organized by some who had been friendly to the comuneros before was discovered in 1747; the plotters were arrested, convicted of treason, and executed.

The conflict was damaging for the Guaraní-Jesuit alliance that sustained the missions, as well. The Guaraní chiefs had traditionally allied with the Jesuits to gain protection against both the Portuguese, the Spanish encomienda, and hostile Indians; but the conflict had taken away many of their best and most reliable workers away during an emergency. The population of the local reductions collapsed; one census report said there were 141,000 people living in the mission towns in 1732, but just 74,000 in 1740, a drop of nearly half. While much of this population loss was from three chained epidemics of disease, it also resulted from famine as agricultural workers were reallocated to fight the rebels, as well as Guaraní who, far from the control of the mission towns, deserted and escaped to become refugees and independents. Trained in warfare and often equipped with firearms, some of these newly independent Guaraní become livestock raiders and bandits, further souring relations with the Paraguayan settlers. The hostile Payaguá took advantage of the disorder of 1732–1740 to increase raids against the Guaraní, taking captives for slaves and other goods.

The Jesuits saw their previously solid support in the royal courts of Catholic Europe wither in the middle of the 18th century for a number of reasons. The theocratic Jesuit missions which expected total obedience to the Fathers grated against the Enlightenment values which were gaining favor among intellectuals. Both the Jesuits and their enemies agreed that the Jesuits were wealthy and prosperous: according to their enemies, due to illegal theft of the best land and corruption; according to the Jesuits, due to their own ability, intellect, and hard work. The Jesuits' influence, money, and near-monopoly on education helped spawn the backlash against them. The Jesuits had lost the support of the Portuguese government in 1750 after they opposed the 1750 treaty of Madrid which led to the Guaraní War; they were expelled from the Portuguese Empire entirely in 1758. The Jesuits next lost the support of Charles III of Spain after the Esquilache Riots, food riots in Madrid in 1766. Charles III fled Madrid for a time, and his ministers convinced him that the riots had been masterminded by the Jesuits as part of a plot. The Jesuits were expelled from the Spanish Empire. In 1767, they were expelled from their college in Asunción, to the elation of its citizens; by the end of 1768, the Jesuits had been expelled from the missions in Paraguay and replaced by secular administrators. The best lands in the former mission territories were quickly taken by white settlers; the herds of cattle were impounded and dwindled; and the mission Indians scattered and diminished. Within a short period of time, the Jesuit missions of Paraguay were but a memory.

The comuneros' reputation was rehabilitated; already folk heroes in the people's eyes, the Spanish government softened its stance on the comuneros as well. A new inquiry in Madrid concluded that Antequera had been the victim of a Jesuit conspiracy. On April 1, 1778, King Charles III signed a document which declared Antequera had been a dedicated and loyal servant of the Crown, and provided pensions for some of his relatives. Both Lima and Asunción feature streets named after Antequera. A monument on a hill in Asunción honors Antequera and all those who fought and died in the Revolt of the Comuneros as precursors to Latin America's liberation movements.

== See also ==
- 1767 expulsion of the Jesuits from the Americas

== Bibliography ==
- Avellaneda, Mercedes (2014). Guaraníes, criollos y jesuitas: Luchas de poder en las Revoluciones Comuneras del Paraguay, siglos XVII y XVIII (in Spanish). Asunción: Editorial Tiempo de Historia. ISBN 978-99967-743-2-4.
- López, Adalberto (2007) [first published 1976]. The Colonial History of Paraguay: The Revolt of the Comuneros, 1721-1735. New Brunswick, New Jersey: Transaction Publishers. ISBN 978-0-7658-0745-8.
- Saeger, James Schofield (1972). "Origins of the Rebellion of Paraguay". The Hispanic American Historical Review. 52 (2). Duke University Press: 215–229. doi:10.2307/2512428. JSTOR 2512428.
