= Fernando de Mompox y Zayas =

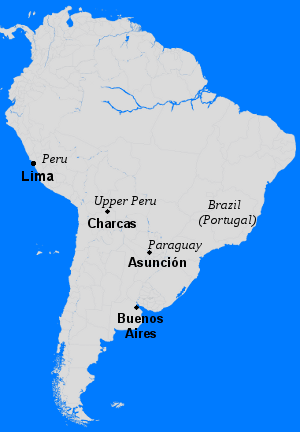
South America during the Revolt of the Comuneros; Mompox was imprisoned in Lima, made his way to Asunción, was imprisoned briefly again in Buenos Aires, and escaped to Brazil.

Fernando de Mompox y Zayas (fl. 1730–1731) (alternatively spelled "de Mómpo y Zayas", without an x) was a leader in the Revolt of the Comuneros of Paraguay. His presence in Paraguay in 1730–1731 was short but influential; despite being an outsider, he quickly became the most influential man in the region in only 6 months. He was a fiery orator who provided an ideological backing for the actions of the rebel comuneros that took over the province from 1731 to 1735.

== Biography ==
=== Background ===
Mompox's origins are cloudy and poorly documented. According to some accounts, he was born in colonial Panama; others that he was born in Valencia (presumably the one in Europe, but perhaps possibly Valencia, New Kingdom of Granada). He lived in New Granada for some time. He was educated and possibly a lawyer. For many years, he worked in Lima, the capital of the Viceroyalty of Peru, possibly as a lawyer at the Real Audiencia of Lima. However, he acquired a reputation as a troublemaker and was imprisoned. During his imprisonment, he probably met José de Antequera y Castro, who was put in prison in Lima in 1726/27. Antequera had appointed himself as Governor of Paraguay after a contentious legal case and incurred the wrath of Viceroy Diego Morcillo Rubio de Auñón, leading to Antequera's sentence. Regardless of whether he met Antequera as a fellow prisoner, he eventually left prison in early 1730, whether from escape or exile. Mompox made his way first to Chile, and then to Asunción in the Governorate of Paraguay, where he arrived in July 1730. In Paraguay, the most controversial issue of the day was the Jesuits and their reductions. The Jesuits controlled a large amount of land, had many Indians under their protection, were economic competitors, and enjoyed the favor of the Spanish royal court. Most Paraguayans wished to check perceived Jesuit privileges, seize land and livestock in the reductions, and to take the Indians under Jesuit protection into the encomienda, a form of slavery.

=== A statesman of the people ===
In Paraguay, he immediately visited and befriended Fernando Curtido, one of Antequera's allies. Curtido, a cabildo (town council) member, introduced Mompox to Governor Martín de Barúa; Barúa was so impressed with him that Mompox became one of his advisors. There, he spread radical, proto-democratic ideas, previously largely unknown to the less educated inhabitants. Drawing on writers such as Juan de Mariana, he said that the government's authority rested on the assent of the común, the community. Kings have power not directly from God, but from their work for the welfare of the community, and if they fail to uphold that, then defying them is legitimate. This meant that the Paraguayans had been within their rights to resist governors who had gone against their will during the disputes of the 1720s. Mompox presented all of this in simple words, meaning even illiterate people in the countryside were soon discussing Mompox's views. One of his charismatic quotes was that the power of the people was greater than even the King or the Pope.

In November 1730, Asunción received news that the new governor Ignacio de Soroeta would soon arrive. Rumors spread that Soroeta was a friend of the hated Jesuits, unlike Barúa. Barúa and Bishop Palos, while skeptical of the Jesuits, counseled for Asunción to accept the new governor, fearful of meeting Antequera's fate. Mompox rallied his followers, the comuneros, to oppose Soroeta. On December 28, a group of around 300 comuneros entered Asunción and demanded that the cabildo deny Soroeta entry to the city. The cabildo stalled for time and asked for the comuneros to leave, but were refused; Governor Barúa resigned in frustration. Mompox demanded and got new elections to the cabildo; with the comuneros in control of the city, only comunero-friendly cabildo members were re-elected, while new men replaced the others.

=== Unofficial leader of Paraguay ===
The new Mompox-aligned cabildo refused Soroeta entry into the city. Soroeta waited in a hermitage around a day's ride from the city at the advice of Bishop Palos to see if the situation would improve. Mompox implored Barúa to take back up the governorship, but Barúa said if he took the governorship, it would only be to hand it over to Soroeta immediately after. Barúa was placed under house arrest. Soroeta was approached by 200 men sent by the new cabildo and informed his services were not needed toward the end of January. Soroeta managed to arrange a brief tour of Asunción under the condition he leave within 4 days. Soroeta was kept under constant watch as a near-prisoner of the comuneros as he learned of the radical shift in mood among the Paraguayans. Convinced there was nothing to be done, Soroeta left Asunción on January 28. Two government-aligned councillors were promptly exiled from the city thereafter as well. Bishop Palos and Barúa both left, as well; Barúa convinced the comuneros there was no way to convince him to retake the governorship.

Under the law at the time, if there was no governor nor replacement governor, official leadership fell to the alcalde of the cabildo, the young and recently elected José Luis Barreyo. Mompox presumably considered Barreyo an ally and a person amenable to his influence. Despite his recent arrival, Mompox was considered the most influential leader in Paraguay. However, in early February 1731, Mompox sought to build a new, parallel government structure on democratic lines: the Junta Gobernativa, whose members would be filled by election. This made Barreyo an enemy of his; Barreyo considered this new rival structure a threat and competitor for control, as well as making it ever more likely the royal government would take action against the restive province.

Barreyo quietly built a power-base inside the city, allowing back some of the moderates who had been exiled before back to the city. Meanwhile, Mompox moved in the countryside, spreading his message of the power of the people and building support for the more radical comuneros. In early April, Barreyo set out from the city with some guards loyal to him, and arranged to meet Mompox. To Mompox's surprise, Barreyo arrested his former ally and immediately sent him south, through the Jesuit missions in Itatín and eventually to a jail cell in Buenos Aires. Barreyo and his men returned to Asunción.

In mid-April 1731, the imprisoned Mompox was sent on a journey under guard to be tried at the capital of Lima, along with a document detailing Mompox's activities in the province. However, his journey was short; near Mendoza, he managed to escape. Rather than attempt to return to Paraguay, he made his way to the nearby Portuguese Empire: first to Colonia del Sacramento (then under Portuguese rule), and from there to Brazil. Here, his history again becomes murky, but according to a work of Pedro Lozano, he lived out the rest of his life quietly as a merchant in Rio de Janeiro.
