= Agustín de Ruyloba =

Manuel Agustín de Ruyloba y Calderón (d. September 15, 1733) served as the Governor of Paraguay in 1733. He immediately faced disobedience, followed by rebellion from the comuneros who controlled the countryside, and was killed soon after his tenure began.

== Biography ==
Ruyloba's early life is not well known. He was maestre de campo of Callao when he was named Governor of Paraguay, a province in turmoil due to the Revolt of the Comuneros. Ruyloba was not the Viceroy's choice for Governor, but rather the Crown in Spain; it is possible that the Continental Spaniards did not have a good sense of how deeply the problems in Paraguay ran and what kind of politician would be needed to quell them. Ruyloba was offered a force of 300 soldiers to take with him by Bruno Mauricio de Zabala, governor of the neighboring Río de la Plata, but he declined it, believing the promises the Paraguayans sent of their loyalty to the King and not wishing to antagonize the situation prematurely. Ruyloba entered Asunción on July 27, 1733, and was recognized as Governor.

Ruyloba's service as governor was extremely short, however, as he proceeded to dramatically overplay his position. He declared in a speech that the establishment of the Junta Gobernativa had been treason, and that anyone attempting to revive it would be publicly executed. After three weeks of assessing the situation, Ruyloba began to dispense the justice that the Viceroy had ordered on the rebels. All elections to the cabildo since 1730 were declared invalid, and the cabildo and leadership of the militia was purged. Ruyloba also began preparations for the return of the hated Jesuits to their college in Asunción. This antagonized what thin support Ruyloba had, and the comuneros began to rally in the countryside again, with Ruyloba largely oblivious to their actions due to having few allies in Paraguay so soon into his tenure. When Ruyloba learnt about the comunero army, he attempted to rally the Asunción militia to ride and meet it, but found his own army deserting him en masse, unwilling to fight the comuneros for a governor who supported the Jesuits and had just arrested many of the leaders of the militia. Ruyloba met with the comunero leaders in a meeting orchestrated by neutral party Bishop Arregui, known to be sympathetic to both sides. Ruyloba was advised to agree to at least some concessions, but he flatly refused. He also declined to leave the province. For honor's sake, Ruyloba took to the battlefield afterward practically alone, since the militia had deserted him. He was killed during a brief battle with the rebels in Guajaibity (near Itauguá), September 15, 1733.

After Ruyloba's death, he was succeeded as governor by Bishop Arregui. Arregui was a facade of legitimacy for the comuneros, though, and wielded little power.
