= Baltazar García Ros =

Navarrese-Spanish soldier and administrator

Baltazar García Ros (Valtierra, Spain, ca. 1670 - Buenos Aires, Río de la Plata, September 18, 1740) was a Navarrese-Spanish soldier and administrator. He was maestre de campo and interim governor of the Governorate of Paraguay from 1706 to 1707 and governor of the Governorate of the Río de la Plata from 1715 to 1717. During his career, he campaigned against the indigenous Charrua, Yaro, and Bohán people; the Portuguese; and the comunero rebels of Paraguay.

== Biography ==
Baltazar García Ros was born around 1670 in Valtierra in Navarre. He enlisted in the army and participated in the Italian Wars. He later left for the Viceroyalty of Peru in the Spanish Empire and arrived in Buenos Aires in 1701, where he was conferred the position of sargento mayor. García Ros was a brave soldier who fought successful campaigns against the Aboriginal Charrua, Yaro, and Bohanes during this time.

In 1705, with Juan de Lacoizqueta, García Ros participated in the Siege of Colonia del Sacramento to take the town from the Portuguese, as part of the War of the Spanish Succession. The Portuguese eventually abandoned Colonia, giving victory to the Spanish. The victory was short-lived; the Treaty of Utrecht specified Colonia was to be handed back to the Portuguese, which happened in 1715. Still, the success earned Ros the title of maestre de campo. He was additionally granted interim governorship of Paraguay until a long-term replacement could arrive from Europe. After Manuel de Robles Lorenzana arrived to lead Paraguay, he returned to Buenos Aires where he served in the government there.

García Ros served as governor of the Río de la Plata from 1715 to 1717. He continued on as Lieutenant Governor when Bruno Mauricio de Zabala arrived to take up the position. In 1724, he was sent to end the governorship of José de Antequera y Castro of Paraguay with military force; Antequera was an official of the Real Audiencia of Charcas who had deposed the former governor and replaced him, an act which the Viceroy considered illegal. Ros's force, composed largely of mission Indians, was soundly defeated by a surprise attack from Antequera's Paraguayan militia. García Ros was forced back in defeat. Antequera's victory was short-lived, though; Governor Zabala personally organized a larger force the next year, and Antequera fled Zabala's oncoming troops in 1725, ending the first phrase of what would later be known as the Revolt of the Comuneros of Paraguay.

García Ros died in Buenos Aires on September 18, 1740.

Government offices
Preceded by Sebastián Félix de Mendiola	Royal Governor of Paraguay; 1706–1707	Succeeded by Manuel de Robles Lorenzana
Preceded by Alonso de Arce y Soria	Royal Governor of Buenos Aires; 1715–1717	Succeeded by Bruno Mauricio de Zabala
