= Martín de Barúa =

Governor of Paraguay

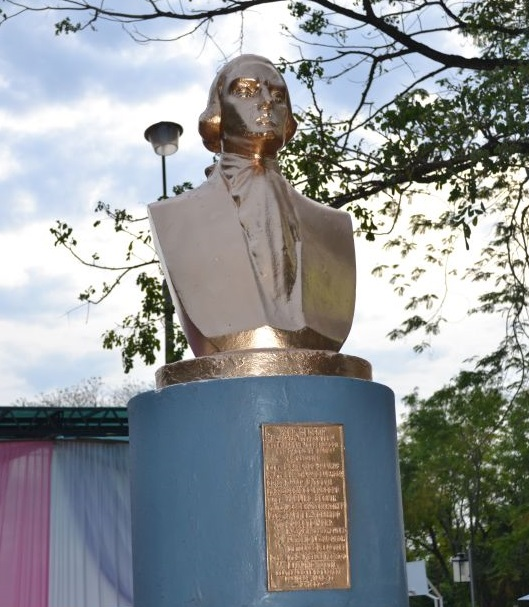
Bust of the Spanish governor Martín de Barúa Picaza in the square of the same name, in the city of Itauguá.

Martín de Barúa (d. Buenos Aires, Governorate of the Río de la Plata, August 18, 1739) was a Spanish soldier and administrator in the Spanish Empire. He served as Lieutenant Governor of Santa Fe between 1714–1716 and 1717–1722, and as Governor of Paraguay between 1725–1730. Under his direction as governor, the cities of Carapeguá and Itauguá were founded, on May 14, 1725 and June 27, 1728, respectively.

== Biography ==
Barúa's early life is unclear. In early 1712, he was apparently a Captain and served as a judge in the Consejo Supremo de Hacienda, a tax court.

Captain Barúa was appointed by Governor of the Río de la Plata Alonso de Arce y Soria to be Lieutenant Governor of the city Santa Fe de la Vera Cruz. He was sworn in on September 28, 1714. He served in this role until 1722, although Juan de Lacoizqueta took it over for a roughly year-long period between 1716–1717.

By the order of the Viceroy of Peru, José de Armendáriz, 1st Marquis of Castelfuerte, Barúa was sent to Paraguay as governor after the troubles with disgraced judge José de Antequera y Castro that had eventually flared into armed resistance to the Empire. Bruno Mauricio de Zabala was serving as interim governor after leading an army to intimidate and depose Antequera, but Zabala was Governor of the Río de la Plata (having replaced Acre), a wealthier and more important province than Paraguay. So that Zabala could return to his duties, Barúa was sent to Asunción. His term as interim governor would last longer than expected, as two intended replacement governors failed to arrive: the first due to being arrested after beating his wife, and the second died in transit from Europe to South America.

As Governor, Barúa pursued a conciliatory policy with Antequera's supporters. The most heated issue in the province was the treatment of the Society of Jesus, who ran the nearby Jesuit reductions. Barúa proved popular with the Paraguayans for defying the Jesuits, similar to Antequera. He only allowed the Jesuits back into their college in Asunción at the direct insistence and order of the Viceroy. Barúa's policy helped keep the peace for 5 years, but did not resolve the fundamental split the province had between the Viceroy's policy and the Paraguayan's desired anti-Jesuit policy. When a replacement governor, Ignacio de Soroeta, was sent, the province of Paraguay was once more deeply unhappy; the settlers asked for Barúa to stay on as governor. Barúa, knowing that Antequera was rotting away in a jail cell, had no desire to commit treason against the Spanish Crown, and insisted that if he kept the governorship, it would only be to hand it over to Soroeta. He eventually resigned in disgust and left the province. The replacement of Barúa and the rejection of Soroeta would go on to become the beginning of the second phase of the Revolt of the Comuneros of Paraguay.

Government offices
Preceded by Bruno Mauricio de Zabala	Royal Governor of Paraguay; 1725–1730	Succeeded by Ignacio de Soroeta
