= Ignacio de Soroeta =

Spanish administrator

Ignacio de Soroeta was a Spanish administrator who was a corregidor in Cuzco and then briefly Governor of Paraguay in 1731. Soroeta's governorship was in name only; he never ruled nor was accepted as governor within colonial Paraguay.

== Biography ==
Soroeta was born in Éibar in Basque Country to noble parents. He left for Spain's overseas empire at some point and became a corregidor in Cuzco. The Viceroy of Peru, the Marquis of Castelfuerte, appointed him as the new governor of Paraguay to take over for interim governor Martín de Barúa. Unfortunately for Soroeta, rumors spread in Paraguay that Soroeta was an ally of the hated Jesuits and disliked former governor Diego de los Reyes Balmaseda, while the popular Barúa had been an opponent of the Jesuits during his term as governor. Despite the entreaties of former governor Barúa and Bishop Palos during December 1730, the citizenry wished to deny entry to their new governor; Barúa resigned in frustration, and elections to the cabildo put a new slate of members hostile to Soroeta and the Jesuits. When Soroeta arrived at the outskirts of Asunción, Paraguay, in January 1731, he was refused entry by the citizenry. He was allowed four days to briefly tour the city, but after being convinced that he would be unable to take up the governorship, he left on January 28, leaving the governorship vacant.

Soroeta returned to Lima, the viceregal capital of the Viceroyalty of Peru. His report of the troubles in Paraguay led to the execution of disgraced former governor José de Antequera y Castro and his advisor Juan de Mena; the Viceroy was convinced that Antequera had sympathizers or allies who were behind the rejection of Soroeta. Soroeta's rejection is considered the beginning of the second phase of the Revolt of the Comuneros of Paraguay.
