= Governorate of Paraguay =

Governorate of the Spanish Empire

Governorate of Paraguay Gobernación del Paraguay
- 1617–1782
- Status: Governorate of the Viceroyalty of Peru Part of the Spanish Empire
- Capital: Asunción
- Common languages: Spanish, Guaraní
- Religion: Roman Catholic
- Historical era: Spanish Empire
  - Created from the split of the Governorate of the Río de la Plata and of Paraguay: December 16 1617
  - Added to the new Viceroyalty of the Río de la Plata: 1782
- ISO 3166 code: PY
Preceded by	Succeeded by
Governorate of the Río de la Plata	Intendency of Paraguay

The Governorate of Paraguay (Spanish: Gobernación del Paraguay), originally called the Governorate of Guayrá, was a governorate of the Spanish Empire and part of the Viceroyalty of Peru. Its seat was the city of Asunción; its territory roughly encompassed the modern day country of Paraguay.

The Governorate was created on December 16, 1617, by the royal decree of King Philip III as a split of the Governorate of the Río de la Plata and of Paraguay into its respective halves. The Governorate lasted until 1782, after which the massive Viceroyalty of Peru was split, and Paraguay became an intendency (intendencia) of the new Viceroyalty of the Río de la Plata.

== List of governors of Paraguay ==
Governors and interim governors of Paraguay
Name	Start of rule	End of rule	King of Spain
Hernando Arias de Saavedra	1615	1617	Philip III
Pedro Hurtado de Mendoza	1618	1621	Philip III
Manuel de Frías	21 October 1621	1627	Philip IV
Luis de Céspedes García Xería	1630	1633	Philip IV
Martín de Ledesma Valderrama	1633	1636	Philip IV
Pedro Lugo de Navarra	1636	1641	Philip IV
Juan de Velasco Villasanti	1641	27 June 1641	Philip IV
Gregorio de Hinestrosa	27 June 1641	2 February 1647	Philip IV
Diego de Escobar y Osorio	2 February 1647	26 February 1649	Philip IV
Bernardino de Cárdenas	4 March 1649	1 October 1649	Philip IV
Sebastián de León y Zárate	1 October 1649	10 October 1650	Philip IV
Andrés Garabito de León	10 October 1650	26 July 1653	Philip IV
Cristóbal de Garay y Saavedra	26 July 1653	21 September 1656	Philip IV
Juan Antonio Blázquez de Valverde	21 September 1656	24 September 1659	Philip IV
Alonso Sarmiento de Sotomayor y Figueroa	24 September 1659	25 August 1662	Philip IV
Juan Diez de Andino	25 August 1662	13 April 1671	Philip IV
Juan Diez de Andino	25 August 1662	13 April 1671	Charles II
Francisco Rege Corvalán	13 April 1671	1676	Charles II
Diego Ibáñez de Farías	1676	1681	Charles II
Juan Diez de Andino	7 October 1681	August 1684	Charles II
Antonio de Vera Mujica	18 October 1684	30 October 1684	Charles II
Alonso Fernández Montiel	30 October 1684	30 October 1685	Charles II
Francisco de Monfort	30 October 1685	2 August 1691	Charles II
Sebastián Félix de Mendiola	22 October 1692	4 December 1696	Charles II
Juan Rodríguez Cota	4 December 1696	27 June 1702	
Juan Rodríguez Cota	4 December 1696	27 June 1702	Philip V
Antonio de Escobar y Gutiérrez	27 June 1702	1705	Philip V
José Ávalos de Mendoza	1705	26 September 1705	Philip V
Sebastián Félix de Mendiola	26 September 1705	9 February 1706	Philip V
Baltazar García Ros	9 February 1706	10 October 1707	Philip V
Manuel de Robles Lorenzana	10 October 1707	5 June 1713	Philip V
Juan Gregorio Bazán de Pedraza	5 June 1713	23 January 1717	Philip V
Andrés Ortiz de Ocampo	23 January 1717	5 February 1717	Philip V
Diego de los Reyes Balmaseda	5 February 1717	20 August 1721	Philip V
José de Antequera y Castro	14 September 1721	5 March 1725	Philip V
Ramón de las Llanas	5 March 1725	29 April 1725	Philip V
Bruno Mauricio de Zabala	29 April 1725	4 May 1725	Philip V
Martín de Barúa	4 May 1725	28 December 1730	Philip V
Ignacio de Soroeta	28 December 1730	25 January 1731	Philip V
Vacant (Revolt of the Comuneros). The comuneros established a Junta Gubernativa presided over by: José Luis Bareiro (1731); Miguel de Garay (1731–1732); Antonio Ruiz de Arellano (1732–1733)	25 January 1731	27 July 1733	Philip V
Agustín de Ruyloba	27 July 1733	14 September 1733	Philip V
Juan de Arregui y Gutiérrez	27 September 1733	9 December 1733	Philip V
Cristóbal Domínguez de Ovelar	9 December 1733	1735	Philip V
Bruno Mauricio de Zabala	30 March 1735	1735	Philip V
José Martín de Echauri	1735	7 November 1740	Philip V
Rafael de la Moneda	7 November 1740	August 1747	Philip V
Rafael de la Moneda	7 November 1740	August 1747	Ferdinand VI
Marcos José Larrazábal	August 1747	10 November 1749	Ferdinand VI
Jaime Sanjust	10 November 1749	2 April 1761	Ferdinand VI
Jaime Sanjust	10 November 1749	2 April 1761	Charles III
José Martínez Fontes	2 April 1761	23 July 1764	Charles III
Fulgencio Yegros y Ledesma	23 July 1764	29 September 1766	Charles III
Carlos Morphi	29 September 1766	23 August 1772	Charles III
Agustín Fernando de Pinedo	23 August 1772	1 February 1778	Charles III
Pedro Melo de Portugal	1 February 1778	21 August 1787	Charles III
