= Alonso Fernández Montiel =

Interim colonial governor of Paraguay

Alonso Fernández Montiel (died 1690) was interim colonial governor of Paraguay in the 1680s.

Fernández Montiel's grandfather of the same name was a conquistador from Andalusia who came to South America with Juan Ortiz de Zárate, and in 1575 settled in Santa Fe de la Vera Cruz, later joining the town council. The conquistador's son, also of the same name, was a soldier and administrator of the Governorate of the Río de la Plata.

The third Alonso Fernández Montiel joined the Santa Fe town council in 1668 and traded yerba mate between there and Asunción. In 1673 he married the wealthy daughter of Sebastián de León y Zárate, former governor of Paraguay. He settled in Asunción and was soon elected to the town council. He was later made lieutenant governor of the province, with military and judicial duties. In a period of political turmoil from 1682 to 1685, he was in charge while the governor was away on military campaigns, and served as interim governor when the incumbent died. In 1688 he gained the largely honorary position of provincial alguacil of the Holy Order (Spanish Inquisition).

Fernández Montiel also led two military campaigns against indigenous peoples in the Gran Chaco. Shortly after the second, he fell ill and died in Asunción.

Fernández Montiel had seven children. The family remained prominent in Asunción into the 19th century.

== Sources ==
- Monte de López Moreira, María (2018). "Alonso Fernandez Montiel". Diccionario biográfico español (in Spanish). Real Academia de la Historia.
