= Siege of Colonia del Sacramento =

1704 siege

Coordinates: 34.4714°S 57.8442°W

- Part of the War of the Spanish Succession
Date	1704 to February 1705
Location	Colonel de Sacramento, Uruguay
Result	Spanish victory

Belligerents
Spain	Portugal

Commanders and leaders
Don Alonso Juan de Valdes e Inclán; Baltasar García Ros	Unknown

Strength
4,000 local forces 650 Spanish reinforcements	Unknown

The siege of Colonia del Sacramento was a successful siege in 1704 by Spanish forces of the Portuguese colonial town of Colonia del Sacramento, opposite Buenos Aires and now in the nation of Uruguay. Four thousand natives and 650 Spaniards, led by the governor of Buenos Aires, Don Alonso Juan de Valdes e Inclán, and Baltasar García Ros, besieged the city beginning late in 1704. One week after a frontal assault failed, in early February 1705, the Portuguese abandoned Colonia del Sacramento.

== See also ==
- Portugal in the War of Spanish Succession
