= José de Armendáriz, 1st Marquis of Castelfuerte =

Spanish soldier and colonial administrator

Don José de Armendáriz Marqués de Castelfuerte Caballero del Toisón de Oro Caballero de Santiago
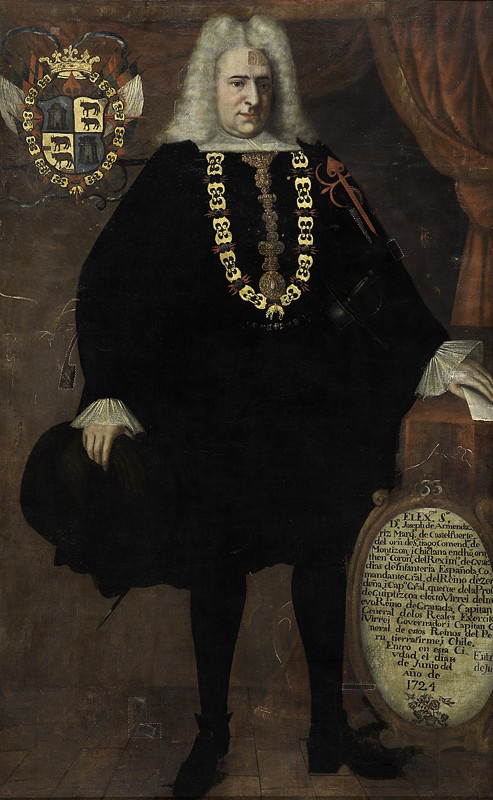

28th Viceroy of Peru
- In office May 14, 1724 – February 4, 1736
- Monarch: Louis I
- Preceded by: Diego Morcillo
- Succeeded by: José Antonio de Mendoza

Personal details
- Born: Ribaforada, Navarre, Spain
- Died: c. 1740 Madrid, Spain

José de Armendáriz y Perurena, 1st Marquis of Castelfuerte (sometimes marqués de Castel-Fuerte) (? in Ribaforada, Navarre – 1740 in probably in Madrid) was a Spanish soldier and colonial administrator. From May 14, 1724, to February 4, 1736, he was viceroy of Peru.

== Early career ==
He entered the military and fought in the War of the Spanish Succession, on the side of Philip V of Spain. He saw action in the campaigns in Naples, Sardinia, Rosellón and Catalonia, and in the siege of Gibraltar. Philip granted him the title of marquess of Castelfuerte on June 5, 1711. He was governor of Tarragona and captain general of Guipúzcoa. He was appointed a member of the Order of the Golden Fleece in 1737 on his return to Spain, and was also awarded the Order of Santiago.

== As viceroy of Peru ==
In 1723, Philip named him viceroy of Peru, a position which he took up in May of the following year. His term in office was distinguished by a campaign against fraud and corruption in the government, and reform of the royal treasury and tax collection. He took steps to strengthen the mita, the forced labor of Indigenous in the silver mines, and thus to stimulate the production of the metal. He sent to jail the Count of San Juan de Lurigancho, director of the mint, as well as the assayer, for producing false coins. In order to fight smuggling (especially of silver), he reorganized the navy and fortified the coasts.

He reestablished the system whereby Inca nobles who could prove their ancestry were recognized as hijosdalgos of Castile. This led to a frenzy on the part of the Indigenous nobility to legitimate their status.

In 1724, society in Lima discovered an exotic drink — coffee. One patron commented, "The new drink is as bitter as the new viceroy".

== The Comunero Revolt in Paraguay ==
During this time, the Comunero Revolt broke out in Paraguay. The governor of Paraguay, Diego de los Reyes Balmaseda, was an unpopular supporter of the Jesuits. A predecessor of Viceroy Armendáriz, Carmine Nicolao Caracciolo, sent an inspector there in 1721 to look into the matter. The inspector was José de Antequera y Castro. Antequera, however, gained the support of the comuneros, challenged royal authority, imprisoned Reyes Balmaceda and expelled the Jesuits. (The Jesuits were unpopular because they sheltered many Indians from forced labor.) Antequera defeated a royalist force from Buenos Aires under García Ros.

In 1724, Armendáriz, now the viceroy in Lima, ordered Buenos Aires governor Bruno Mauricio de Zabala to suppress the rebellion and send Antequera to Lima for trial. Antequera's followers deserted him, and he was forced to flee to a convent in Cordóba in March 1725. He was arrested at Chuquisaca in Charcas, and taken to Lima. He was eventually brought to trial, and in 1731 he was beheaded. However, another revolt broke out in Paraguay in 1730, under Fernando Mompó de Zayas. Mompó asserted the sovereignty of the people over the king.

Armendáriz faced other rebellions as well. The first uprising of the Chiriguanos, led by Aruma, occurred in 1727. In 1730 there was an insurrection in Oropesa, led by the Mestizo Alejo Calatayud.

== End of his term ==
In 1736, Armendáriz turned over the office to his successor, José Antonio de Mendoza, 3rd Marquis of Villagarcía. The ex-viceroy returned to Spain, became captain of the king's guard, and was elected a Knight of the Order of the Golden Fleece in 1737. He died in 1740 without descendants.

Government offices
| Preceded by Diego Morcillo | Viceroy of Peru; 1724–1736 | Succeeded by José Antonio de Mendoza |
