= Ribaforada =

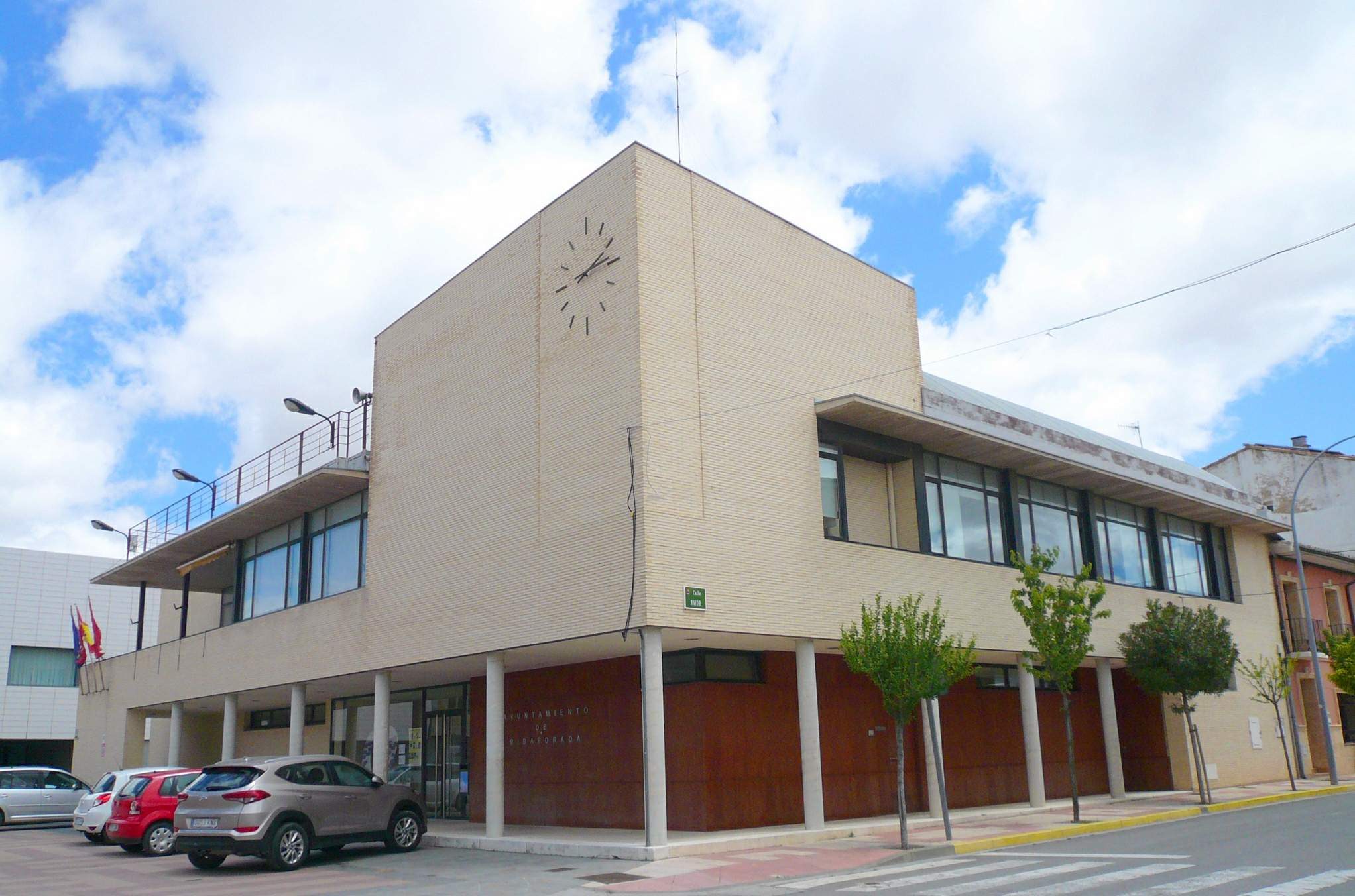
- Town hall of Ribaforada

- Coat of arms

- Location within Navarre Location within Spain
- Coordinates: 42°00′N 1°30′W
- Country: Spain
- Autonomous community: Navarre

Ribaforada is a town and municipality located in the province and autonomous community of Navarre, northern Spain. Their football team is the Club Deportivo Ribaforada.
