= Gregorio de Hinestrosa =

Governor of Paraguay, 1641 to 1647

Gregorio de Hinestrosa (fl. 1610 – c. 1647) was Governor of Paraguay from June 27, 1641 to February 2, 1647.

== Biography ==
Gregorio de Hinestrosa was born in the Governorate of Chile, part of the Spanish Empire's Viceroyalty of Peru. His family had a long tradition of service to the Spanish Empire in its government and military. Hinestrosa continued this himself and became an officer; he attained the rank of Maestre de Campo, the commander of a colonial militia in Chile. Hinestrosa also suffered a long captivity as a hostage of hostile Indians in Chile. After his release, he served for a time as mayor of the Atacama region of Chile. He went to peninsular Spain to serve in the Franco-Spanish War and distinguished himself in the Siege of Fuenterrabía of 1638 against the French. As a reward for his service, he was given the title of Governor of Paraguay.

Hinestrosa's term as Governor of Paraguay is most remembered for his feud with Bernardino de Cárdenas, the bishop of Paraguay and a member of the Franciscan order. Both Hinestrosa and Cárdenas arrived in the province in 1641. Both men were proud and arrogant, and the resulting clash of personalities soon became a rivalry for power. Both Hinestrosa and Cárdenas were initially popular among the people. In 1644, however, Cárdenas began to win out in popular support. The Jesuits, who ran the nearby Jesuit reductions, threw their support behind Hinestrosa, while the Franciscans and the Paraguayan settlers supported Cárdenas. Cárdenas railed against the Jesuits, claiming they were teaching "heretical principles" to the Indians, while Hinestrosa and the Jesuits claimed that Cárdenas's ordination as bishop in 1638 by civil authorities had been invalid due to the lack of a papal order. Hinestrosa ordered the Jesuit college of Asunción guarded, but unsure of the loyalty of the local militia, took the unprecedented step of asking the Jesuit's Indian armies for aid. While previous Governors of Paraguay had requested the assistance of the Jesuits against the Portuguese or hostile Indians, asking for Indian support against the Paraguayan settlers was considered an insult by the Paraguayans. Under Hinestrosa's orders, Cárdenas was disavowed as bishop by the local diocese, and Cárdenas was ordered to leave Paraguay. Cárdenas continued his propaganda campaign against Hinestrosa from Corrientes. The province remained in a state of disorder into 1647, with the conclusion of Hinestrosa's tenure as governor.

Hinestrosa was succeeded by Diego de Escobar y Osorio as governor. Escobar y Osorio rebuked Hinestrosa for construction performed on the home he'd taken for his personal quarters from an army widow. After Escobar y Osorio's death in 1649, the Paraguayans would elect Hinestrosa's hated rival Bishop Cárdenas as governor.
