= Itauguá =

City in Paraguay

Itauguá Ytaygua
- City
- Ruta #2

- Location within Paraguay
- Coordinates: 25°23′S 57°20′W
- Country: Paraguay
- Department: Central
- Founded: June 27, 1728
- Founder: Martín de Barúa

Government
  - Intendente Municipal: Horacio Daniel Fernández Morínigo

Area
  - Total: 122 km^{2} (47 sq mi)
- Elevation: 170 m (560 ft)

Population (2016)
  - Total: 100,456
  - Density: 1,090.84/km^{2} (2,825.3/sq mi)
- Time zone: UTC-4 (-4 Gmt)
- Postal code: 2740
- Area code: (595) (294)
- Climate: Cfa

Itauguá (Spanish pronunciation: [itawˈɣwa]; Guarani: Ytaygua) is a city and district in the Central Department of Paraguay, located approximately 30 kilometers (19 mi) east of Asunción. Its territory extends toward the southwestern shore of Ypacaraí Lake. The district's jurisdiction encompasses the main urban center alongside numerous compañías (rural hamlets) and neighborhoods. It shares borders with the districts of Areguá, Capiatá, Itá, Julián Augusto Saldívar, Pirayú, and Ypacaraí. According to the 2022 Paraguayan census, Itauguá has a population of 93,213 inhabitants.

The city's origins date back to the colonial period. Although its official founding is conventionally attributed to Martín de Barúa in 1728, local historiography continues to debate the exact timeline of its early settlement. Known for its traditional ñandutí lace-making industry, a major part of the local culture and economy, Itauguá was officially designated the "capital of ñandutí" in 2012.

== Etymology ==
There is no consensus regarding the origin of the patronymic name "Itauguá", although it is acknowledged that it derives from the Guaraní language. Three authors have proposed hypotheses on the matter, presented here according to their year of publication:

- González (1960) suggests the term Itahũguá (ita: stone; hũ: black; guá: suffix indicating belonging), interpreted as "place of the black stones". Pedrozo later challenged this explanation, noting the absence of basaltic rocks in the region.
- Pedrozo (1994) proposes Itayguá (Itay: an old stream in the area; guá: belonging), interpreted as "inhabitant of the Itay stream". In this interpretation, the Guaraní vowel y would have shifted to u due to Spanish euphony.
- Caballero (2015) maintains that the original name was Ytaguá (ita: stone; guá: belonging), meaning "place of the stones". He bases this interpretation on reports by cartographer and explorer Félix de Azara, who visited the settlement around 1790. According to Azara, the site was initially called Ytacuá (ytá: stone; cuá: hole). Azara later recorded the name as Ytaguá, with an initial y and without the vowel u, which over time evolved into Itauguá. The name was written with y until the 1950s, when it shifted to the use of i.

== Demography ==
According to the 2022 Paraguayan census, Itauguá has a total population of 93,213 with a median age of 29 years. The gender distribution consists of 46,749 men and 46,464 women. The population includes 67,686 urban residents and 25,527 rural residents. Additionally, the census recorded 5,184 individuals with some form of disability.

The population breakdown by age and area is as follows:

- 0–14 years: 22,680 people (16,284 urban, 6,396 rural)
- 15–64 years: 63,294 people (46,233 urban, 17,061 rural)
- 65 years and older: 7,239 people (5,169 urban, 2,070 rural)

In the 2022 census, 26,204 occupied private homes were recorded, with an average household size of 3.5 occupants. Approximately 22.3% of households in the district have at least one unmet basic need. The district's housing stock consists of the following types:

- Houses: 24,120
- Traditional rural homes (ranchos): 1,091
- Tenement housing / Multi-family rentals: 584
- Improvised housing: 159
- Apartments: 139
- Other types: 111

Public utility coverage and technological connectivity across households are distributed as follows:

- Electricity: 26,077 households
- Sanitary drainage / Sewage: 25,133 households
- Running water: 25,077 households
- Smartphones: 23,334 households
- Flat-screen televisions: 18,623 households
- Waste collection services: 12,920 households
- Internet access: 12,319 households
- Laptops: 6,551 households
- Tablets: 2,284 households

== Tourism ==
Among the touristic attractions are the hills Patiño and Cerrito, the Virgen del Rosario Church, the San Rafael Museum, and the colonial houses built during the time of the former dictator Gaspar Rodríguez de Francia.

== Climate ==
The climate is pretty fresh. The warm weather predominates with high temperatures during the spring and the summer.

== Economy ==
Itauguá is characterized especially by the manufacturing and sale of textiles of Ñandutí. This product is exported to many foreign countries.

== Neighborhoods and Companies ==
Here are some of its companies:

- Aldama Cañada
- Potrero
- Virgen de Guadalupe
- Guayaibity
- San Antonio
- Zeballos
- Itaugua-Guazu
- Mbocayaty
- Cañada
- Patiño
