= Diego de Escobar y Osorio =

Governor of Paraguay (1647–1649)

Diego de Escobar y Osorio (died February 22, 1649) was Governor of Paraguay from February 2, 1647 to February 22, 1649.

== Biography ==
Diego de Escobar y Osorio was born in the Captaincy General of Chile, part of the Viceroyalty of Peru. He attained the rank of Maestre de Campo, and became an oidor (judge) of the Real Audiencia of Charcas. He was named Governor of Paraguay in 1644; however, he did not arrive in the province to begin his governorship until February 1647. On his journey there, he met in Corrientes Bernardino de Cárdenas, the deposed Bishop of Asunción. Cárdenas had been involved in an acrimonious dispute with the Governor of Paraguay being replaced, Gregorio de Hinestrosa. Cárdenas pleaded his case to Osorio and gained his temporary support; the two entered Asunción together to a warm welcome from the citizenry, and Osorio replaced Hinestrosa.

Despite Osorio's support of Cárdenas's return, he stayed neutral in the continuing dispute between Cárdenas's faction and Hinestrosa's faction. Notably, the Franciscan order supported Cárdenas, while the Jesuits had supported Hinestrosa. According to historian Adalberto López, Osorio "proved to be an exceptionally intelligent and able administrator" and he "managed to keep himself neutral and to prevent violent threats from becoming violent acts." However, his reign was short; Osorio died only 2 years into his term. Using the Royal Decree of 1537, the Paraguayans elected Bishop Cárdenas as the replacement governor to succeed Osorio, setting up a clash of Paraguay against the Jesuit missions and the rest of the Spanish Empire.

Government offices
Preceded by Gregorio de Hinestrosa	Royal Governor of Paraguay; 1647–1649	Succeeded by Bernardino de Cárdenas
