= Bernardino de Cárdenas =

Governor of Paraguay in 1649

Bernardino de Cárdenas y Ponce, O.F.M., (1579?–1668) was a friar of the Franciscan order and Bishop of Asunción and later Santa Cruz de la Sierra. He served as Governor of Paraguay from March 4, 1649 – October 1, 1649. He ordered the first expulsion of the Jesuits from the Governorate of Paraguay, although this expulsion did not last; he was deposed as governor following a battle against the Jesuit armies.

== Early life ==
He was born Cristóbal de Cárdenas in La Paz, Upper Peru. He studied theology at the Jesuit College of San Martin in Lima, and changed his given name to Bernardino upon joining the Franciscan order. Cárdenas served at the Convent of Chuquisaca in 1614–1620 and as a missionary among the Quechua Indians in 1621–1627, and traveled through both Upper and Lower Peru. Cárdenas impressed the Real Audiencia of Charcas, and was appointed Bishop of Paraguay in 1638. However, it was not until 1641 that he left Upper Peru for Córdoba to be consecrated as bishop by the Bishop in residence. There was a minor dispute first, however; the Bishop of Córdoba was a Jesuit, and while the governmental approval of the appointment was complete, the papal bulls had not yet arrived, and the Jesuit order supported the idea that only the pope could ordain a bishop. Nevertheless, the Bishop of Córdoba consecrated Cárdenas, and Cárdenas departed for Asunción.

== Feud with Governor Hinestrosa ==
Cárdenas arrived in Asunción, the same year as the new governor, Gregorio de Hinestrosa. Both men were proud, and a feud for power developed between the two. The feud eventually expanded to include the Jesuit Fathers as well, who managed the nearby Jesuit Reductions. While Cárdenas spoke warmly of the Jesuits at first, praising them in a letter written in 1643, the Jesuits eventually backed Hinestrosa, an open admirer of the Jesuits, in the political struggle between the governor and the bishop. In turn, this caused Cárdenas to criticize the Jesuits; he claimed the Jesuits were teaching "heretical principles" to the Indians, and threatened to expel them from the province in September 1644. These stances gained Cárdenas the favor of many of the Paraguayan settlers, who disliked the Jesuit missions as economic competitors among other complaints. Governor Hinestrosa turned to the Jesuit armies of Indians to take control of the situation in Asunción; he compelled the local diocese to depose Cárdenas on the grounds his consecration had not been valid, and exiled him from Paraguay in November 1644.

Cárdenas left for Corrientes, where he continued to engage in a war of letters and propaganda against Hinestrosa with the support of his fellow Franciscans. However, the Jesuits won over the Viceroy of Peru, Pedro de Toledo. The viceroy ordered Cárdenas to appear before the Audiencia of Charcas to answer the charges against him issued by the Jesuits and Hinestrosa. Cárdenas disobeyed the order, claiming illness and old age, and remained in Corrientes. In 1647, he met incoming Governor of Paraguay Diego de Escobar y Osorio, and convinced him to allow his return to the province. Cárdenas and Osorio both left for Asunción, and Cárdenas was restored as bishop. The situation in Paraguay remained tense for two years, but stable.

== Governorship of Paraguay ==
On February 22, 1649, Governor Osorio died. A quirk of history was that a Royal Decree issued in 1537 theoretically gave Paraguay the right to elect its own governor if the current governor was dead or otherwise incapacitated. A crowd of approximately 250 Paraguayans in the main plaza elected Bishop Cárdenas as Governor on March 4 until the Crown should see fit to appoint a new governor; Cárdenas allegedly said "the voice of the people is the voice of God." Two days later, on the 6th, Cárdenas ordered the Jesuits expelled from the province with the approval of the cabildo and the majority of the populace. Immediately upon the proclamation of the order, a mob broke into the Jesuit college of Asunción, sent the friars into the streets, and looted the building of its valuables. The reaction in the rest of the Spanish Empire was almost uniformly against Cárdenas and his supporters. The new Viceroy of Peru, the Count of Salvatierra, ordered Cárdenas to appear in Charcas and restore the Jesuits; he also declared that Sebastián de León y Zárate, Hinestrosa's Lieutenant Governor, should become the interim Governor of Paraguay. León y Zárate, who had been at the Jesuit missions when hearing the news, returned to Asunción, but was denied entry. León y Zárate returned to the missions and rallied an army of mission Indians; Cárdenas rallied several hundred Paraguayan militia in reply. (Source differ on how many troops were involved; some say León y Zárate had around 700 mission Indians, others 3,000 of which 1,000 bore firearms. One old source also says that Cárdenas rallied around 400 allied Guaraní (indios amigos) to his cause as well.) The two sides met in a brief battle on October 5, 1649, in which the Paraguayans lost in a complete defeat. Twenty-two settlers died and many more were wounded. Cárdenas was imprisoned by León y Zárate, and the citizens of Asunción suffered what to them was the humiliating spectacle of an occupying army of Indians. Cárdenas was eventually exiled from Paraguay and sent to Charcas in Upper Peru.

Luckily for Cárdenas, in the time he was held at Charcas, the Jesuits' fortunes were on the decline in the royal courts of Madrid after the Jesuits had supported the independence of Portugal from Spain. Cárdenas was reprimanded for accepting the result of the election based on the old decree and for expelling the Jesuits without royal permission, but received no further punishment. He was restored to his post as Bishop of Asunción in 1660; after he claimed he was too old and ill to make the journey back to Paraguay, he was made Bishop of Santa Cruz de la Sierra instead, in Upper Peru. Cárdenas died in Arani on October 20, 1668.

== External links and additional sources ==
- Cheney, David M. "Archdiocese of Asunción". Catholic-Hierarchy.org. (for Chronology of Bishops) ^{[self-published]}
- Chow, Gabriel. "Metropolitan Archdiocese of Asunción (Paraguay)". GCatholic.org. (for Chronology of Bishops) ^{[self-published]}
- Cheney, David M. "Archdiocese of Santa Cruz de la Sierra". Catholic-Hierarchy.org. (for Chronology of Bishops) ^{[self-published]}
- Chow, Gabriel. "Metropolitan Archdiocese of Santa Cruz de la Sierra". GCatholic.org. (for Chronology of Bishops) ^{[self-published]}

Religious titles
Preceded by Francisco de la Serna	Bishop of Paraguay; 1640–1666	Succeeded by Gabriel de Guilléstegui
Preceded by Juan de Ribera	Bishop of Santa Cruz de la Sierra; 1666–1668	Succeeded by Juan de Esturizada
Government offices
Preceded by Diego de Escobar y Osorio	Royal Governor of Paraguay; 1649–1649	Succeeded by Sebastián de León y Zárate
