= Diego de los Reyes Balmaseda =

Governor of Paraguay

Diego de los Reyes y Balmaseda (fl. 1690–1733) was the Governor of Paraguay from February 5, 1717 to August 20, 1721. His governorship was deeply unpopular with the inhabitants of Asunción, and an investigation by judge José de Antequera y Castro of the Real Audiencia of Charcas concluded that Reyes had abused his office, and he was deposed. Antequera took the governorship of Paraguay upon himself afterward, the beginning of the Revolt of the Comuneros. Reyes never recovered his governorship, and was eventually exiled from the province after a year-long imprisonment.

== Biography ==
Diego de los Reyes y Balmaseda was born in El Puerto de Santa María, Spain, but moved when he was very young to Asunción in the Governorate of Paraguay, where he resided for the majority of his life. Reyes became a wealthy merchant who exported yerba mate from Paraguay and imported manufactured goods back to Paraguay. He married Francisca Benitez, another inhabitant of Asunción. In 1717, he purchased the vacant governorship; purchase of office was a practice that had spread throughout the Spanish Empire at the time, although Reyes was considered qualified regardless.

However, Reyes proved an unpopular governor. He acquired a reputation for enriching himself using the powers of his office to control trade. He also was seen as too friendly to the Jesuits, who were quite unpopular themselves in Paraguay. Two of his wife's uncles were members of the Jesuit order, and several of his most important advisers were Jesuits. Reyes' Jesuit advisors instigated him to order an attack on the Payaguá Indians of the Chaco despite a tenuous truce established three years earlier in 1717; all of the captured Payaguás were remitted to the Jesuits for conversion to Christianity and mission life. The settlers received no captives to be enslaved in the encomienda system, although it had been the settler militia that risked their lives fighting the Payaguás and colonial trade and outlying farms would now be threatened by retaliatory Payaguá raids. Reyes also acquired a reputation for enriching himself using the powers of his office to control trade. Reyes also taxed important members of the Paraguayan elite to fund the construction of defensive fortifications.

In a bid to keep his position, Reyes accused his chief antagonists of treason and had them imprisoned. Important members of the cabildo (town council) of Asunción complained to the Real Audiencia of Charcas in 1720, accusing Reyes both of imprisoning the cabildo members without good cause, as well as general unlawful conduct as governor. The Audiencia of Charcas sent judge José de Antequera y Castro to investigate of Reyes. The charges given were as expected: the unlawful war against the Payaguás, accusations of corruption with his wife's continuing trade, establishing new taxes without authority, impeding the trade of those merchants who opposed him, and attempting to stop complaints about his rule from reaching the Audencia. Antequera, interviewing only the witnesses for the plaintiff first, found the charges so compelling he shortly demanded Reyes removed from office without even hearing Reyes' witnesses. Antequera eventually convicted Reyes of the crimes, and claimed the governorship of Paraguay for himself, a bit of self-dealing that enraged Reyes and his supporters.

Reyes fled Asunción before he could be arrested, and continued to plead his case. The Viceroy of Peru found that Antequera's proceedings had been illegal due to his ability to both try the governor and succeed him, and merchant supporters of Antequera had their goods impounded at Reyes' behest downriver of Asunción in Corrientes. Annoyed at this, Antequera sent men to Corrientes, where they kidnapped Reyes and brought him back to Asunción, where he was kept nearly in solitary confinement for more than a year. Reyes was only released after Antequera was deposed as governor, but not wishing to incite the Paraguayans to revolt, he was quietly told by the Spanish government to move somewhere else. Little is known as to what happened to Reyes afterward; he moved to Lima and in 1733, the Viceroy, the Marquis of Castelfuerte, issued an official document absolving him of all the accusations made against him during the Revolt of the Comuneros and by Antequera. Reyes never returned to Asunción; aside from this, his time and place of death are unknown. However, his son Don Carlos de los Reyes Balmaseda did return to Asunción, and became a member of its cabildo in 1740.

Government offices
Preceded by Andrés Ortiz de Ocampo	Royal Governor of Paraguay; 1717–1721	Succeeded by José de Antequera y Castro
