= Pedro Lozano =

Spanish ethnographer, historian and Jesuit missionary

Father Pedro Lozano (1697–1752) was a Spanish ethnographer, historian and Jesuit Missionary.

== Life ==
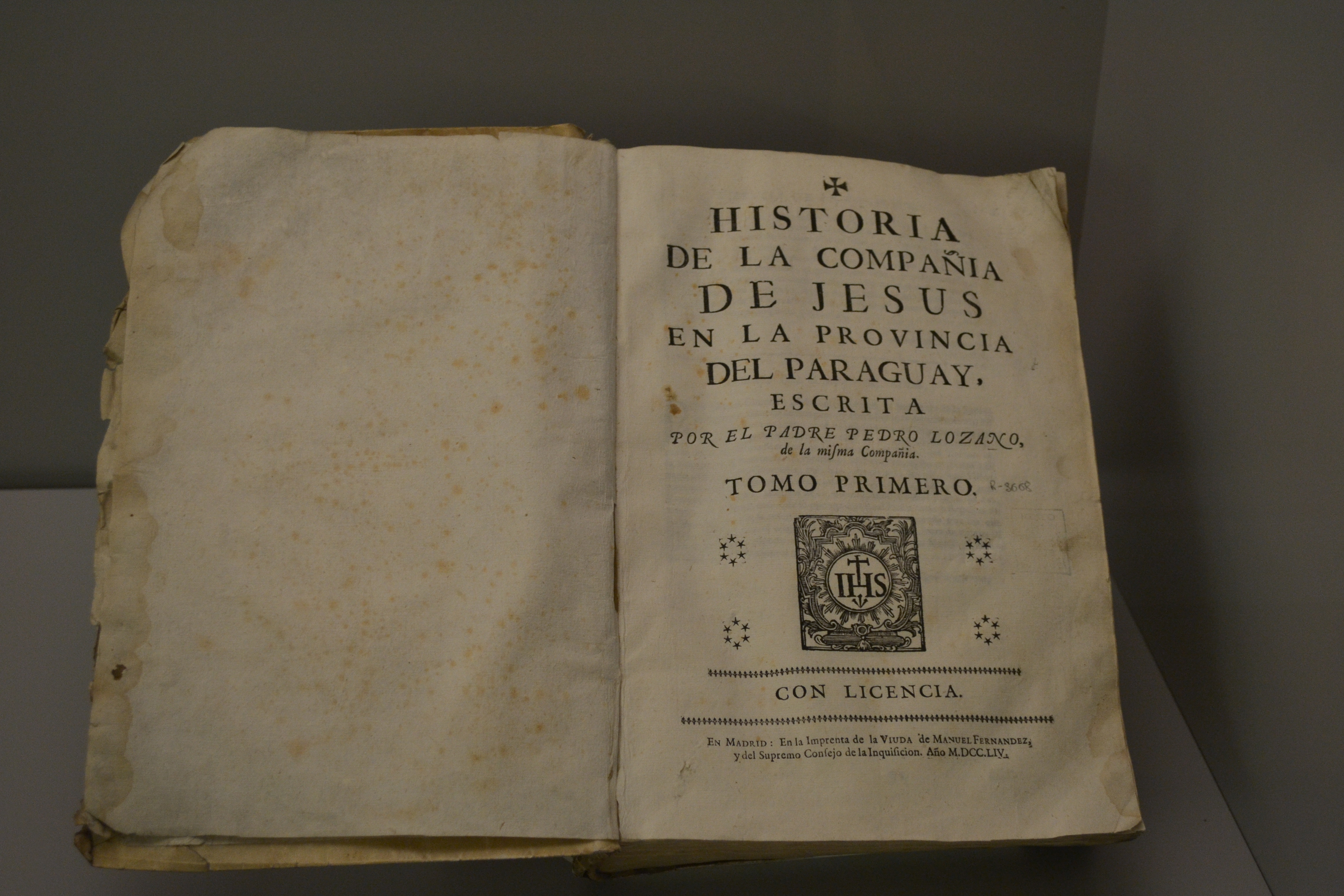
Historia de la Compañía de la Jesús de la provincia del Paraguay, exhibited in the Museum of the Americas (Madrid).

He was born in Madrid and arrived in the Americas at an early age, in 1714, bound for the Jesuit Reductions of Paraguay. He studied at the Collegium Maximum in Córdoba, where he became a lecturer in philosophy and theology. He also taught at the college in Santa Fe between 1724 and 1730, eventually returning to Córdoba as historian of the Jesuit province of Paraguay.

He produced various geographical and historical works, the most notable being Descripción chorographica [...] del Gran Chaco. This work has a detailed map by Father Antonio Machoni, and contains numerous ethnographic details of the peoples of the Gran Chaco, as well as descriptions of the rivers, a study of the types of soil, numerous observations on the flora of the region, and in particular the medicinal plants, and interesting observations on the fauna. It is a curious fact that Lozano entertained a remarkable opinion of yerba mate: in Historia de la Conquista del Paraguay he writes that it "is the most fitting method to destroy the human type or most wretched nation of the Guarani Indians" .

He died in Humahuaca (in present-day Argentina), and his remains were interred at the church of San Antonio de Padua in the small town of Uquia.

== Works ==
- Descripción chorographica de Terreno Ríos, Arboles, y Animales de los dilatadísimas provincias del Gran Chaco, Gualamba, y de los Ritos y Costumbres de la inumerables naciones de barbaros e infideles que le habitan. Con un cabal Relación Histórica de lo que en ellos han obrado para conquistarlas algunos Gobernadores y Ministros Reales, y los Misioneros Jesuitas para reducirlos a la fe del Verdadero Dios. Córdoba: Joseph Santos Balbas, 1733.
- Historia de la Compañía de la Jesús de la Provincia del Paraguay. Madrid, 1755.
- Historia de la Conquista del Paraguay, Río de la Plata y Tucumán. Reprinted Buenos Aires: Imprenta Popular, 1873–75
- Historia de las Revoluciones de la Provincia del Paraguay 1721-1735 Facsimile reprint. Buenos Aires: Cabaut y Cía, 1905.
