= Alonso de Arce y Soria =

Spanish army officer and politician

General Alonso de Arce y Soria

Governor of Buenos Aires
- In office 1712 – 2 October 1714
- Monarch: Philip V
- Preceded by: Juan José de Muliloa
- Succeeded by: José Bermúdez de Castro

Personal details
- Born: 1654 Cañete, Cuenca, Spain
- Died: 2 October 1714 (aged 59–60) Buenos Aires, Argentina
- Spouse: María Claudia García de Arcos.
- Occupation: Government
- Profession: Army's officer
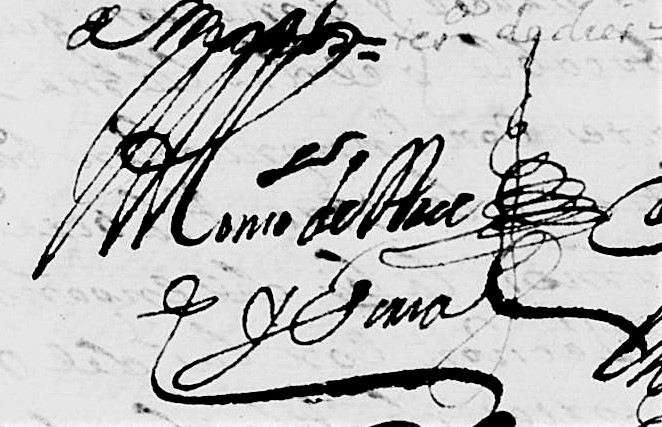
- Signature

Military service
- Allegiance: Spanish Empire
- Branch/service: Spanish Army
- Years of service: 1670-1710
- Rank: General
- Unit: Tercios de Flandes

Alonso de Arce y Soria (1654 - 1714) was a Spanish army's officer and politician, who served during the Viceroyalty of Peru as governor of Buenos Aires.

== Biography ==
He was born in Cañete, Cuenca, Spain, the son of José de Arce and María López de Soria, belonging to a noble Castilian family. He performed his military career in the Reales Ejércitos, serving for more than forty years in Flanders. He arrived in Buenos Aires in 1712 from Madrid, where he had purchased the title of Governor and Captain general of the Río de la Plata provinces.

He died on October 2, 1714, being replaced by Sergeant Major José Bermúdez de Castro.

His son Alonso Arce Arcos, was married to María Báez de Alpoim, daughter of Juan Báez de Alpoim and Sabina Lavayén, belonging to a distinguished family of Buenos Aires. His granddaughter María Bartolina de Arce, was married to Agustín Fernando de Pinedo, governor of Paraguay between 1772 and 1778.
