= José de Antequera y Castro =

Panamanian lawyer and judge

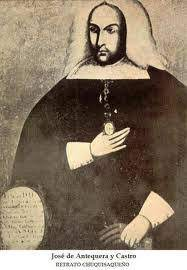
José de Antequera y Castro

José de Antequera y Castro (Panama, 1689—Peru, July 5, 1731) was a Panamanian lawyer and judge in the Viceroyalty of Peru (then including Panama, Bolivia and Paraguay) who worked with the Real Audiencia of Charcas. He traveled to Paraguay to investigate allegations of corruption against Governor Diego de los Reyes Balmaseda. Controversially, he found Reyes guilty and then took the position of Governor of Paraguay for himself in 1721. He defended his position even against explicit instructions from the Viceroy of Peru to hand the Governorship back to Reyes, and rallied the militia to fight off attempts by Spanish authorities to push him out of power. However, his position eventually became untenable, and under the threat of an overwhelming military response, he fled the governorship. He was eventually arrested and executed.

Antequera's actions would retrospectively be considered the start of the Revolt of the Comuneros of Paraguay.

== Early career ==
Antequera y Castro was born in Panama. He was an oidor (judge) in the Real Audiencia of Panama before traveling to Spain. He became a knight of the Order of Alcántara. He was public prosecutor before the Real Audiencia of Charcas (Upper Peru, now Bolivia) in charge of protecting the Indians.

== In Paraguay ==
He was sent from Charcas to Asunción, Paraguay in 1721 as an inspector and member of the Audiencia there. His instructions were to investigate charges made by the cabildo (city council) of Asunción against the governor of Paraguay, Diego de los Reyes Balmaseda. If the governor's guilt was established, Antequera was to remove him from office, occupy the office himself, and reestablish justice in the province. If, on the other hand, the governor was acquitted, Antequera was to wait until the expiration of his legal term in office, and then take over the government.

Reyes Balmaceda was removed as governor, and Antequera earned the sympathy of the Spanish settlers in Paraguay. After the removal of Reyes, the Criollos named Antequera to take his place. Antequera became acting governor in August 1721. Reyes Balmaseda was restored in February 1722, but before the year was out, Antequera was again governor. He retained the position until March 5, 1725.

The Jesuits, however, were supporters of the dismissed governor. They had been working actively to shelter the Indians from the forced-labor demands of the colonists, and were therefore resented by the colonists. Reyes Balmaseda had supported the Jesuits, and it was that connection that led to the colonists' call for his removal. After Antequera consolidated his power, he expelled the Jesuits.

He then defeated a royalist force from Buenos Aires under García Ros. Reyes Balmaseda had fled to Corrientes, and in a surprise raid there, Antequera took him prisoner.

== Defeat and capture ==
In 1724, José de Armendáriz, now the viceroy in Lima, ordered Buenos Aires governor Bruno Mauricio de Zabala to suppress the rebellion and send Antequera to Lima for trial. Zabala led an army which included 6,000 Indians from the Jesuit missions against Antequera. On instructions from King Philip V, Armendáriz ordered the Jesuits readmitted. (After some delay, they reoccupied their college in Asunción on March 18, 1728).

In the face of the army raised against them, Antequera's followers deserted him. In March 1725 he was forced to flee to a Franciscan convent in Córdoba, and from there he later fled to Charcas. Foolishly, he went to the Audiencia of Charcas to plead his case before his old friends and coworkers, but they were not going to protect him from the orders of the Viceroy. He was arrested at Chuquisaca in Charcas, and taken to Lima. He received lenient treatment and was given liberties to travel within the jail and the city itself during the four years while his case was being heard. On September 4, 1728, Antequera sent a report to the Audiencia of Charcas, defending his actions in Paraguay.

== Continued unrest ==
Antequera might have escaped severe punishment had the situation in Paraguay stayed quiet, but it did not. Unrest there continued. Fernando de Mompox y Zayas was also in Lima, and probably met Antequera in prison at some point in 1727–1730. Mompox somehow escaped or was released in 1730, and made his way to Paraguay, where he stayed with and befriended Fernando Curtido, one of Antequera's allies. The fact that Mompox was able to immediately find one of Antequera's friends and seemingly acclimate himself to the political climate in Paraguay so rapidly suggests he did indeed meet Antequera in prison and receive information on the state of affairs. Mompox asserted the assent of the people as the basis for all political power, and did so in easy-to-digest popular speeches that common uneducated folk could follow along with. If Antequera had privately known of political philosophy that could allow defying a king in certain situations, Mompox made these philosophies public, and attracted many new colonists to his cause. Mompox quickly became the most influential person in the region, capable of rallying large groups of armed colonists to his cause, and helping ensure that the newly appointed governor for Paraguay, Ignacio de Soroeta, would be refused entry.

News of Soroeta's rejection reached Lima in May 1731, enraging the Marquis of Castelfuerte, the Viceroy of Peru. Antequera's lenient treatment ended; he was chained to a cell and refused permission to have visitors or talk with anyone other than the authorities. While Antequera and his supporters said he had nothing to do with events back in Paraguay, the government disagreed. The head of the Real Audiencia of Lima searched Antequera's cell and said he found a letter from Mompox to him, proving that he was continuing to instigate problems and spread treason. The situation for Antequera worsened when a letter from Madrid arrived in June 1731. The Council of the Indies had recommended to the king, and the king accepted the recommendation, that there was sufficient evidence that Antequera was guilty of the crime of treason, and his punishment should be in public so as to set an example for others. As treason was a capital crime, this essentially sentenced him to death.

== Execution ==
Antequera's execution was scheduled for July 5, 1731. When Antequera was brought to the Plaza de Armas, where he was to be beheaded, the crowd assembled there demanded his pardon and threw stones at his escort. Viceroy Armendáriz, who was in attendance, rode among the crowd to try to quiet them, but he too was pelted with stones. Fearing that Antequera would escape, Armendáriz ordered the soldiers to shoot him, which they did. They then turned their guns on the crowd. Several priests were killed. Antequera's corpse was then taken from his place of death to the scaffold and beheaded. The head was displayed publicly.

In 1778, King Charles III of Spain annulled the verdict against Antequera, declaring him a good and loyal minister.

Government offices
Preceded by Diego de los Reyes Balmaseda	Royal Governor of Paraguay; 1721–1725	Succeeded by Bruno Mauricio de Zabala
