= Juan de Arregui =

Spanish Franciscan priest

Juan de Arregui (June 24, 1656 – †1736) was a Spanish Franciscan priest native of America and became Roman Catholic Bishop of Buenos Aires in 1730.

de Arregui was born on 24 June 1656 in Buenos Aires (then in Governorate of the Río de la Plata of the Viceroyalty of Peru), entered the Franciscan order and studied theology at National University of Córdoba.

He died as Bishop of Buenos Aires on 19 December 1736.

== Biography ==
Friar Juan de Arregui was bishop of Buenos Aires (1731) and Paraguay (1735). He exerted political leadership in Paraguay (1733 - 1734) during Revolt of the Comuneros (Paraguay).

== External links and additional sources ==
- Cheney, David M. "Archdiocese of Asunción". Catholic-Hierarchy.org. (for Chronology of Bishops)^{self-published}
- Chow, Gabriel. "Metropolitan Archdiocese of Asunción". GCatholic.org. Archived from the original on 2013-03-16. (for Chronology of Bishops)^{self-published}
