= Bruno Mauricio de Zabala =

Spanish soldier and colonial administrator

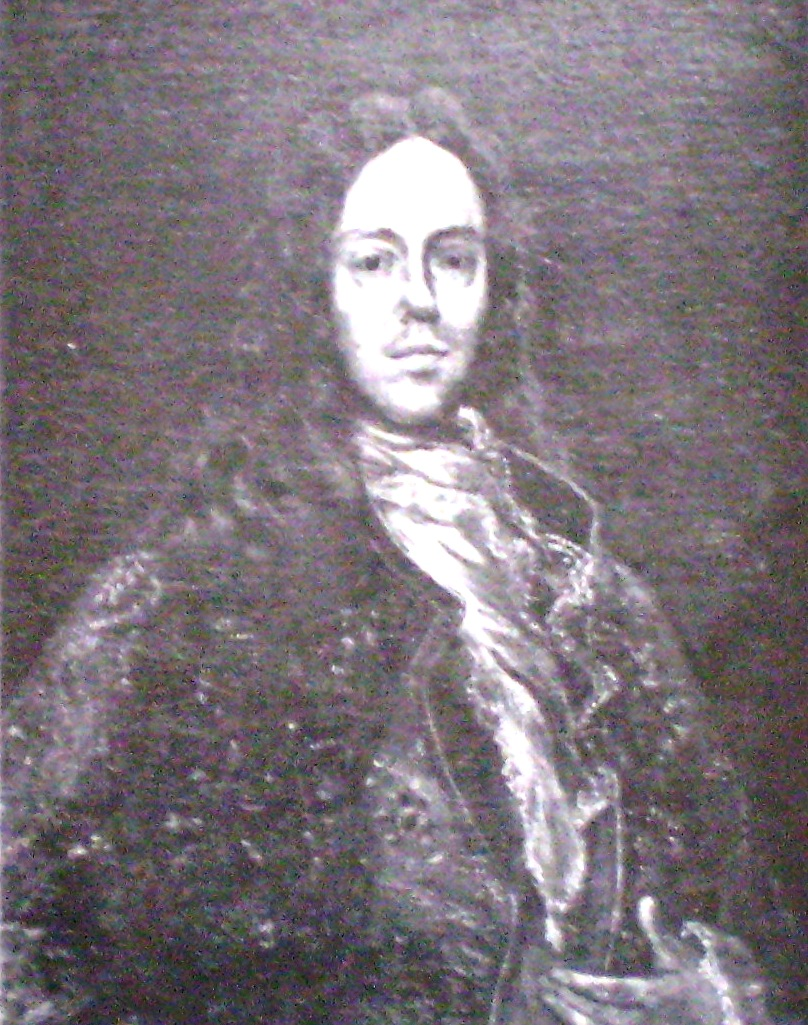
- Born: 6 October 1682; Durango, Crown of Castile
- Died: 31 January 1736 (aged 53); Ayolas, Viceroyalty of Peru
- Occupation: Governor

Bruno Mauricio de Zabala y Gortázar (6 October, 1682 – 31 January, 1736) was a Spanish soldier and colonial administrator who served as governor of the Governorate of the Río de la Plata from 1717 to 1734 and founded the city of Montevideo, capital of present-day Uruguay.

== Biography ==
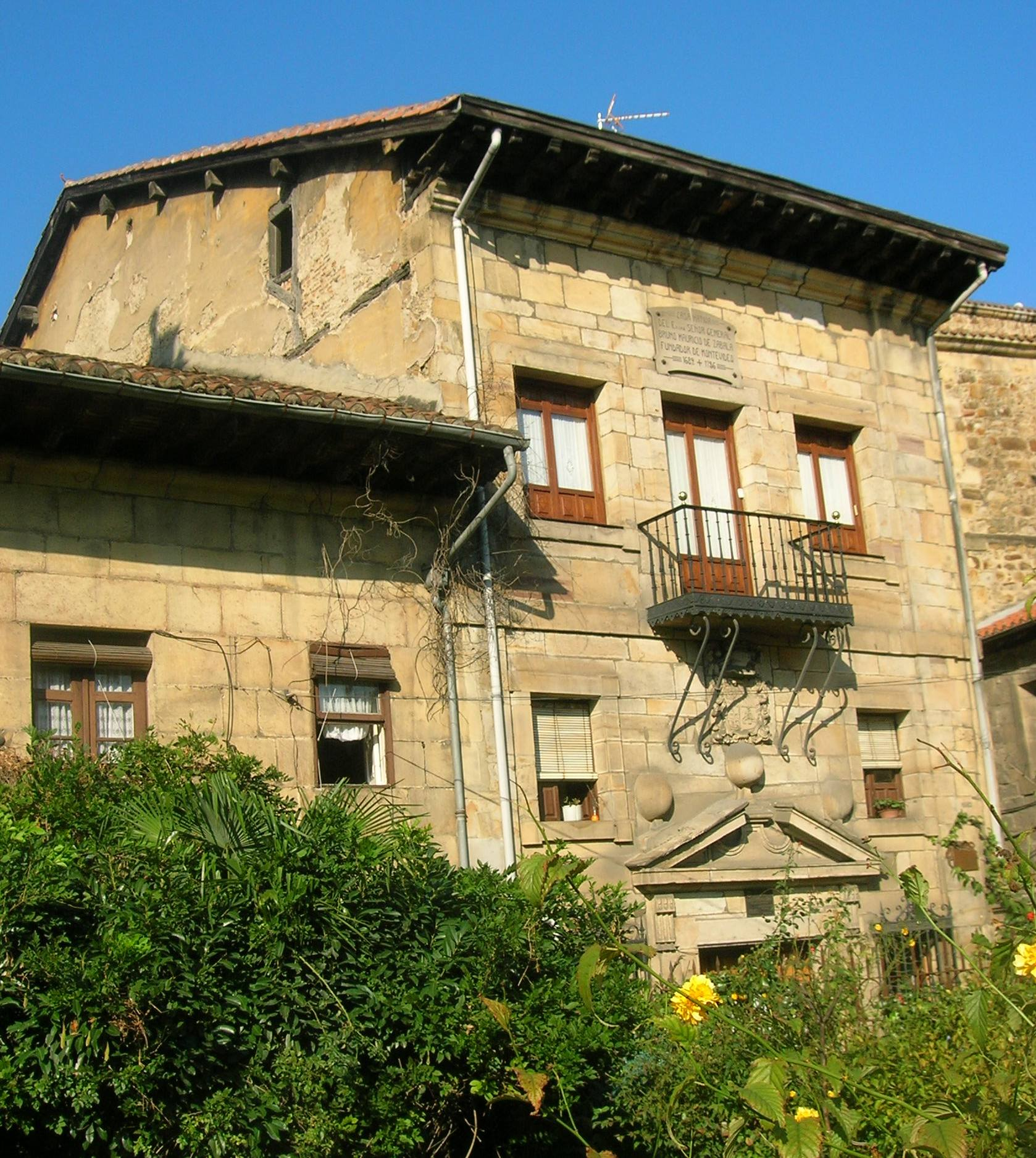
Zabala's birthplace

Son of a distinguished merchant who made his fortune in the New World, Bruno Mauricio de Zabala was born in Zabala, then located outside the walls of Durango, but now part of the town in the province of Biscay. His birthplace has been preserved to this day, and one of its walls bears two plaques commemorating his military achievements overseas.

In 1717 Zabala was named capitán general of the Río de la Plata, where he suppressed piracy and confronted the Portuguese, who sought to claim the River Plate for themselves. In 1724, to contend with these rivals, Zabala constructed a coastal fortress. This settlement, designated as San Felipe y Santiago de Montevideo, became the center of Spanish control over the Banda Oriental, and later the capital of Uruguay. In 1725 and 1735, Zabala briefly served as interim governor of Paraguay, then part of the Viceroyalty of Peru, where he eventually died of a stroke at the age of 53.

== See also ==
- Plaza Zabala

Government offices
Preceded by Baltazar García Ros	Royal Governor of the Río de la Plata; 1725	Succeeded by Miguel de Salcedo
Preceded by José de Antequera y Castro	Royal Governor of Paraguay; 1706–1707	Succeeded by Martín de Barúa
Preceded by Cristóbal Domínguez de Ovelar	Royal Governor of Paraguay; 1735-1736	Succeeded by José Martín de Echauri
