= Juan Miguel de Esparza =

Spanish military man, merchant and politician

Capitán Juan Miguel de Esparza

Mayor of Buenos Aires
- In office 1764–1765
- Monarch: Charles III of Spain
- Preceded by: Joseph Blás de Gainza
- Succeeded by: Eugenio Lerdo de Tejada

Vice-Mayor of Buenos Aires
- In office 1748–1749
- Monarch: Ferdinand VI of Spain
- Preceded by: Francisco Rodríguez de Vida
- Succeeded by: Pedro Contreras

Personal details
- Born: Juan Miguel de Esparza Cabral de Melo y Morales; 1712 Buenos Aires, Argentina
- Died: 1766 (aged 53–54) Buenos Aires, Argentina
- Resting place: Santo Domingo Convent
- Spouse(s): María Josefa González de Alderete; María Eugenia Sánchez Gallanes
- Children: Camila de Esparza; Catalina Bernarda de Esparza
- Relatives: Francisco Antonio de Esparza (uncle); Juan José Rocha Esparza (grandson); Juan José Rocha Durán (great-grandson); Isidro Quesada Rocha (great-grandson); Isidro Félix Quesada (relative in law); Pedro Morales y Mercado (ancestor); Francisco Pérez de Burgos (ancestor)
- Occupation: government politician militia law merchant
- Profession: jurist accountant military man
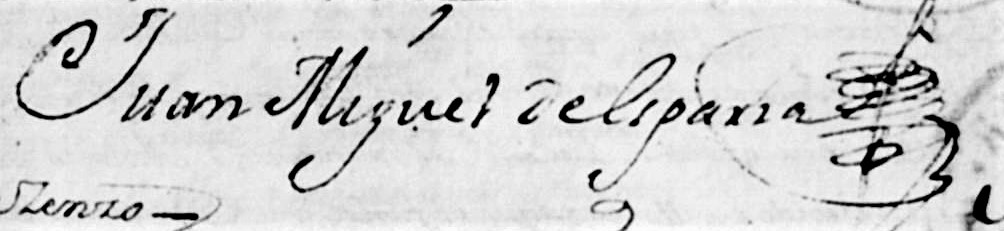
- Signature

Military service
- Allegiance: Spanish Empire
- Branch/service: Spanish Army
- Years of service: 1732-1766
- Rank: Captain
- Unit: Fuerte de Buenos Aires
- Commands: Milicias Provinciales de Buenos Aires

Juan Miguel de Esparza (1712–1766) was a Spanish military man, merchant and politician, who had a long career as a colonial official of the Viceroyalty of Peru, where he held the honorary positions of alcalde and regidor. He took part in numerous military expeditions aimed at controlling the Indigenous advance in the Province of Buenos Aires. He also served as lawyer, treasurer and Alférez real in charge of carrying the Royal Standard during the day of Saint Martin of Tours.

He held the position of Procurador General of Buenos Aires in 1737 and 1754, taking an active part in matters tending to the supervision and control of commercial and governmental matters.

== Career ==
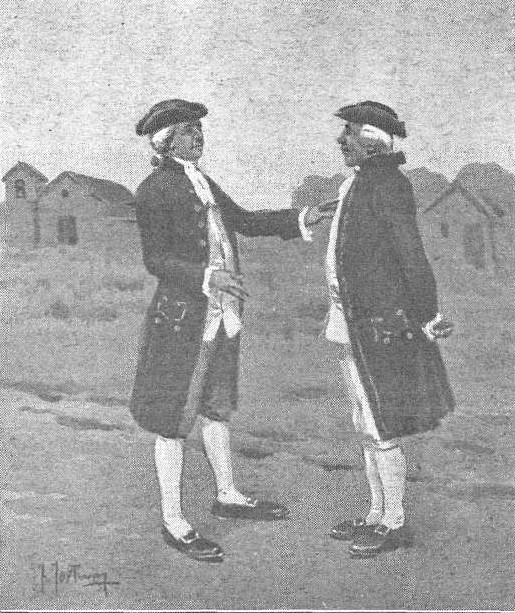
Officers of the Cabildo of Buenos Aires by Marià Fortuny

He was born in Buenos Aires, the son of Miguel Gerónimo de Esparza and Antonia Cabral de Melo, belonging to a noble family of the city. He did his studies in the Colegio Nacional de Monserrat, and got his law degree at the University of Saint Francis Xavier. His first public office was in 1737 as Procurador General of Buenos Aires, being also entrusted to raise money for his Majesty the King of Spain. In 1738 he served as delegate of the Buenos Aires Cabildo in the 1738 census in the City.

He made several trips to Spain, living for some time in Cádiz, where he dedicated himself to trade. He returned to the city of Buenos Aires around the year 1743, where he continued to fulfill commercial and governmental tasks. In 1749 he denounced the illegal traffic of hides, made by foreign ships on the shores of the Río de la Plata.

He served as vice-mayor of Buenos Aires in 1748, and was elected mayor of the city in 1764. His works like head of the government of Buenos Aires, include the construction of a tower in the Cabildo of the city. This tower was finished for the year of 1765, and included an expensive clock brought from Cadiz.

He also held the position of regidor of the Ayuntamiento and treasurer of The Reales Cajas de la Real Audiencia de Buenos Aires, and he took part in the debates produced by the conflict between Spain and Portugal (Spanish–Portuguese War) over the domain of the Colonia del Sacramento.

He had an outstanding service in ceremonial tributes to distinguished personalities of the 18th century. In 1747, he participated in the funeral honors held in Buenos Aires to the monarch Philip V of Spain, deceased in 1746. He carried the Royal Standard for various periods, including during the celebrations for the assumption of Ferdinand VI, being escorted by a Regiment of Dragons with sword in hand.

In 1754, Juan Miguel de Esparza was legal representative of several creditors of Francisco de Escalada (merchant), among which was Patrick Lynch, a famous Irish merchant established in Buenos Aires. He was also in charge of the legal defense of people without economic resources, including a black man named Felix, who had exercised the office of executioner of the city of Buenos Aires.

In 1763, Juan Miguel de Esparza, appointed as his agent to Jerónimo de Angulo, caballero of the Order of Santiago and conde of San Isidro, who was in charge of his legal matters in the territories of the Viceroyalty of Peru.

Juan Miguel de Esparza served for many years in the Plana Mayor of the Milicias Provinciales de Buenos Aires of the Spanish Army, taking an active part in the military campaigns against the Indigenous Pampas that attacked Spanish settlements in the area of Lujan. In 1752, he participated in punitive expeditions against the Calelián tribes, serving in the "La Valerosa", a militia of the Blandengues of the Frontier, under command Captain José de Zarate.

Esparza participated in the establishment of various charities in the city, including the Hermandad de la Caridad (Brotherhood of Charity), a religious institution of colonial Buenos Aires. Currently a street in the neighborhood of Balvanera, carries the name Esparza, in honor to Miguel Gerónimo Esparza, Joseph de Esparza (regidor), Francisco Esparza (priest), Juan Miguel and Martín Esparza, friar assassinated during the second British invasions of the River Plate.

== Family ==
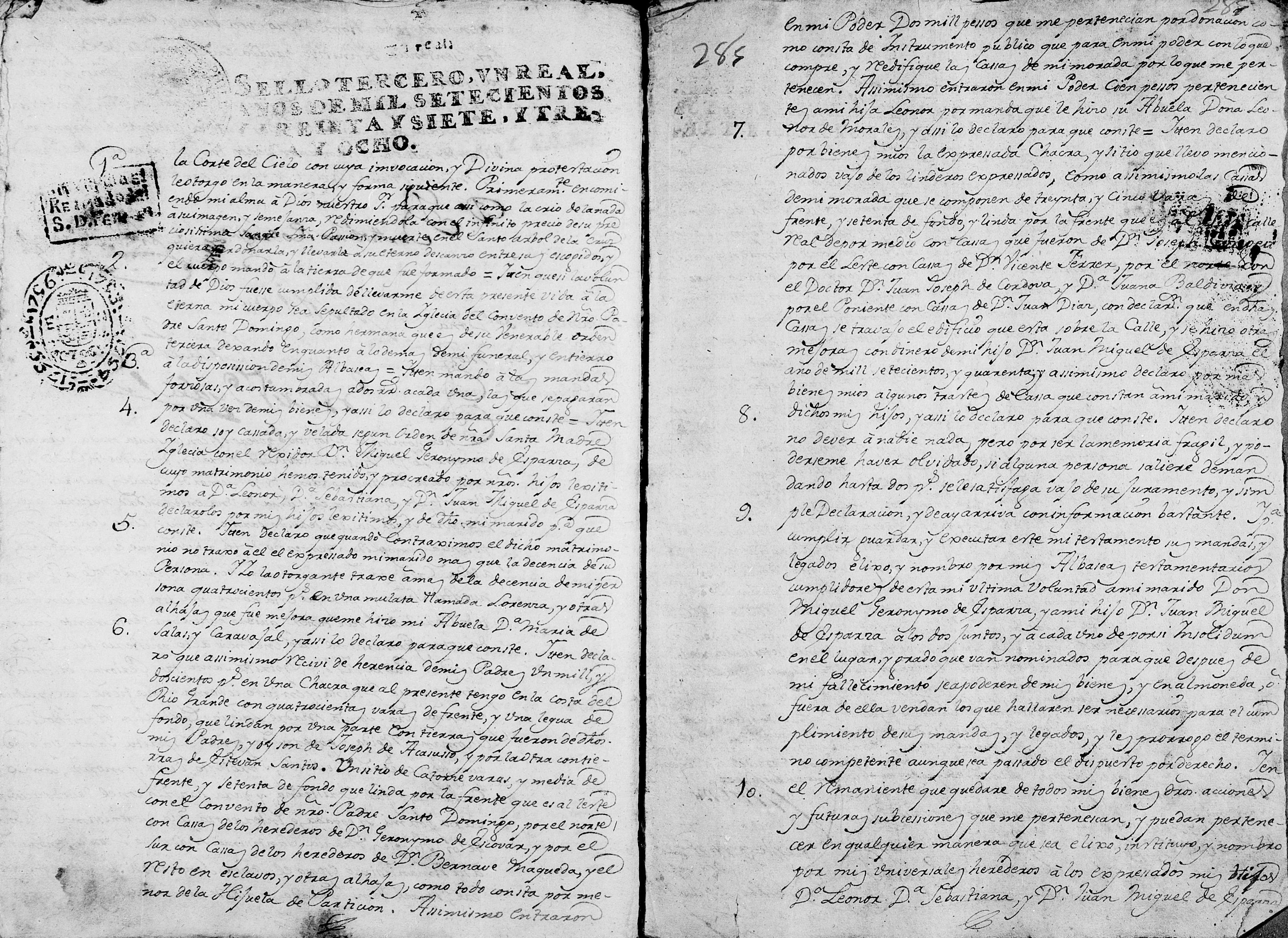
His mother's will, with various genealogical data

Juan Miguel de Esparza was baptized on January 30, 1712, in the Cathedral of Buenos Aires by the presbyter Bernardino Verdún, being his godparents Miguel de Riglos and Josefa Rosa Alvarado. He was married to his cousin María Eugenia Sánchez, daughter of Francisco Sánchez and Sebastiana Zenarro, a noble lady belonging to the Third Order of Saint Francis. He and his wife were the parents of numerous children, including Mariano Marcos Esparza, godson of Francisco Álvarez Campana, and María Ana de Esparza, goddaughter of Francisco de Cabrera and Antonia Saavedra.

His wife María Eugenia Sánchez Gallanos, was born in 1730 in Buenos Aires, and died on March 3, 1817, being buried in the Santo Domingo convent. In her will, she declared that she owned a house located in the Santo Domingo neighborhood, close to that of the Warnes ladies (daughters of Manuel Antonio Warnes) and Mariano Olier, a personal friend of the family. Her maternal family was related to Juan de Zenarro, born in Pasaia, and Inés Esparza Rodríguez, born in Buenos Aires.

Very few genealogical and historical data are found about his father, Captain Francisco Sánchez Gallano, a Spanish noble, belonging to the Third Order of Saint Francis.

All the male children of Juan Miguel de Esparza died in Buenos Aires during the colonial period. His daughter Camila de Esparza (natural daughter), was married to Juan José de Rocha, direct ancestors of Emilio Castro Rocha and Dardo Rocha, governors of Buenos Aires Province. His daughter Bernarda Catalina de Esparza, was the wife of Juan de Canaveris, one of the assistants to the Open Cabildo during the May Revolution. Most of his descendants are through the Canaveris Esparza marriage, linked in turn to the main Argentine families.

Juan Miguel de Esparza was a remote descendant of illustrious Spanish personalities who included the kings and queens of Castile and Navarre. On February 15, 1612 Manuel Cabral de Melo, the great-uncle of Antonia Cabral Morales, made a certificate of nobility (delivered by the King of Arms of Portugal). Through his daughters his lineage was related to distinguished patrician families like the Porcel de Peralta Ramos Mexía, Castro Castillo, Pueyrredón O'Dogan, Sundblad Sáenz and others. He also has an illustrious connection with the Brigadier Estanislao López.

His paternal ancestors came from Navarra, and his maternal (mitochondrial line) came from Ronda, in the Province of Málaga.
