= Alejo de Esparza =

Basque soldier and merchant, who served as Commander of the Fort of Buenos Aires

Alejo de Esparza y Ustarroz
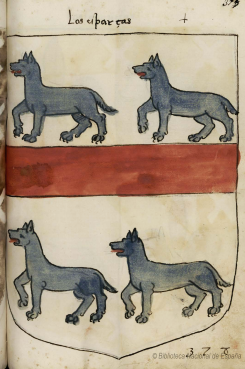
- Coat of Arms of Esparza

Personal details
- Born: 1638 Lumbier, Kingdom of Navarre
- Died: c.1712 Buenos Aires, Viceroyalty of Peru
- Spouse: Escolástica Rodríguez y Martínez
- Occupation: Merchant
- Profession: Soldier
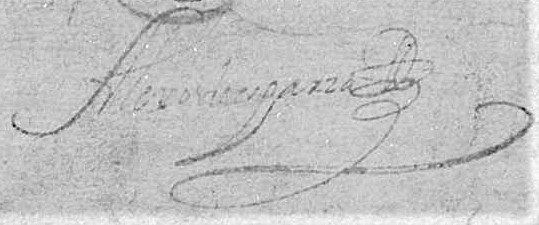
- Signature

Military service
- Allegiance: Spain
- Branch/service: Spanish Army
- Rank: Captain
- Unit: Fuerte de Buenos Aires

Alejo de Esparza (c. 1638-1700s) was a Basque soldier and merchant, who served as commander of the Fort of Buenos Aires and colonizer of the city in the 17th century. He was the founder of the Esparza family in Río de la Plata, whose paternal branch was extinguished in the eighteenth century. His sons, Joseph de Esparza and Miguel Gerónimo de Esparza were distinguished members of government during the Viceroyalty of Peru.

== Biography ==
Esparza was born 1638 in Lumbier, Navarre, the son of Pedro de Esparza, belonging to illustrious Navarrese families, and Colomba de Garro, daughter of a noble family of French Basque roots. In January 1660, Esparza arrived at the port of Buenos Aires, on the ship "Nuestra Señora de Aranzazu". He had been recruited as a soldier in San Sebastian, place from where the expedition, led by Martin de Telleria, departed to Buenos Aires. The mission of Telleria was to bring weapons and two infantry companies to reinforce the city fortifications.

He was married in Buenos Aires to Escolástica Rodríguez, native of the city and daughter of Alfonso Rodríguez and Trinidad Martínez. The wedding was held on July 5, 1660, in the parish of La Merced (Buenos Aires), witnessed by Juan Ramírez Arellano, born in Santiago, captain of La Serena, who had also served in the fort of Buenos Aires.

Established in the Río de la Plata, Alejo de Esparza devoted himself completely to commerce, being one of the richest merchants in the city. He owned a pulperia and maintained commercial ties with Cádiz. His son, Miguel Gerónimo de Esparza y Rodríguez, served as alcalde and regidor of Buenos Aires. His paternal and maternal surname (Esparza-Garro) belonged to illustrious families of Navarre, possibly descendants of Ramón de Esparza and Pere Arnaut de Garro.
