= Antonio Cabral de Melo =

Politician

Captain Antonio Cabral de Melo y Carbajal
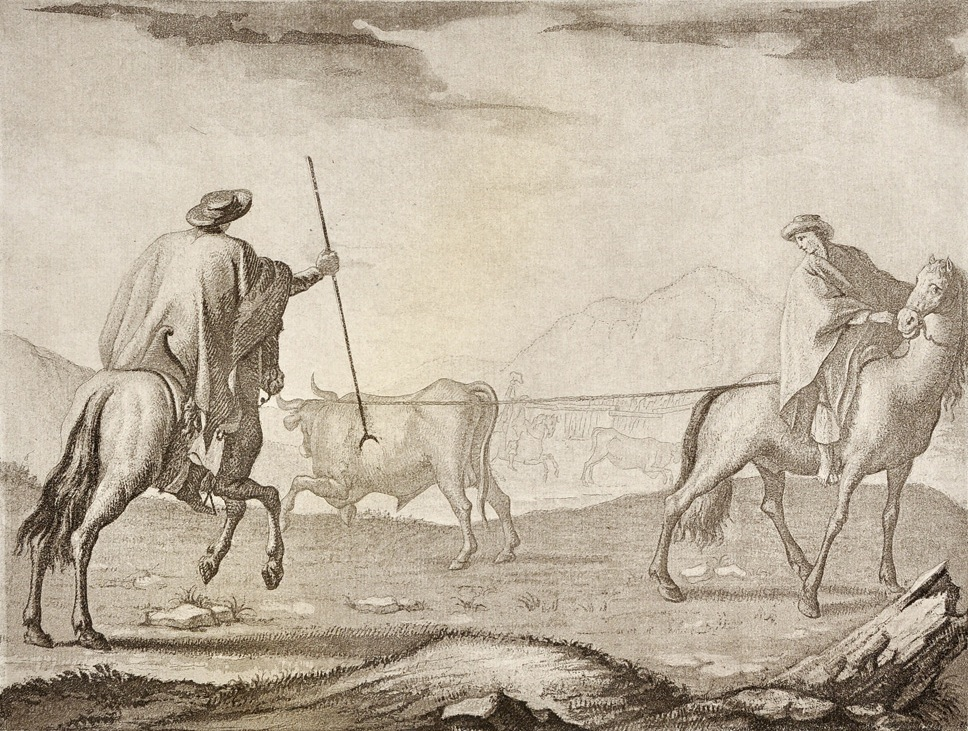
- Enlazando ganado en las pampas by Fernando Brambila

Accionero del Ganado Vacuno of Buenos Aires Province

Personal details
- Born: Antonio Román Cabral de Melo Alpoim y Carbajal de Salas c. 1646 Buenos Aires, Viceroyalty of Peru
- Died: c. 1717 Buenos Aires, Viceroyalty of Peru
- Spouse: Leonor de Morales
- Occupation: landowner cattle merchant
- Profession: Militia Officer
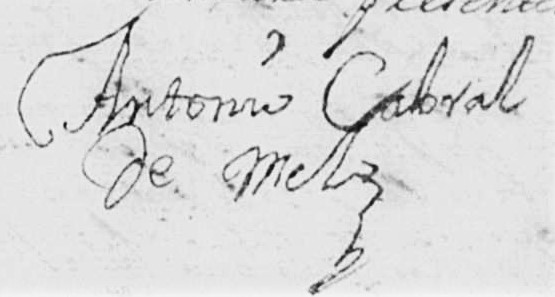
- Signature

Military service
- Allegiance: Spanish Empire
- Branch/service: Spanish Army
- Years of service: c. 1670 – c. 1700
- Rank: Captain
- Unit: Fuerte de Buenos Aires
- Commands: Milicias Provinciales de Buenos Aires

Antonio Cabral de Melo (1646 – c. 1717) was a landowner, farmer, and provincial militia captain in what was then the Viceroyalty of Peru. A farmer and rancher by trade, he eventually secured the position of accionero, which granted him the authority to slaughter feral cattle on the vaquerías (open ranches and fields) of the Río de la Plata region.

== Biography ==
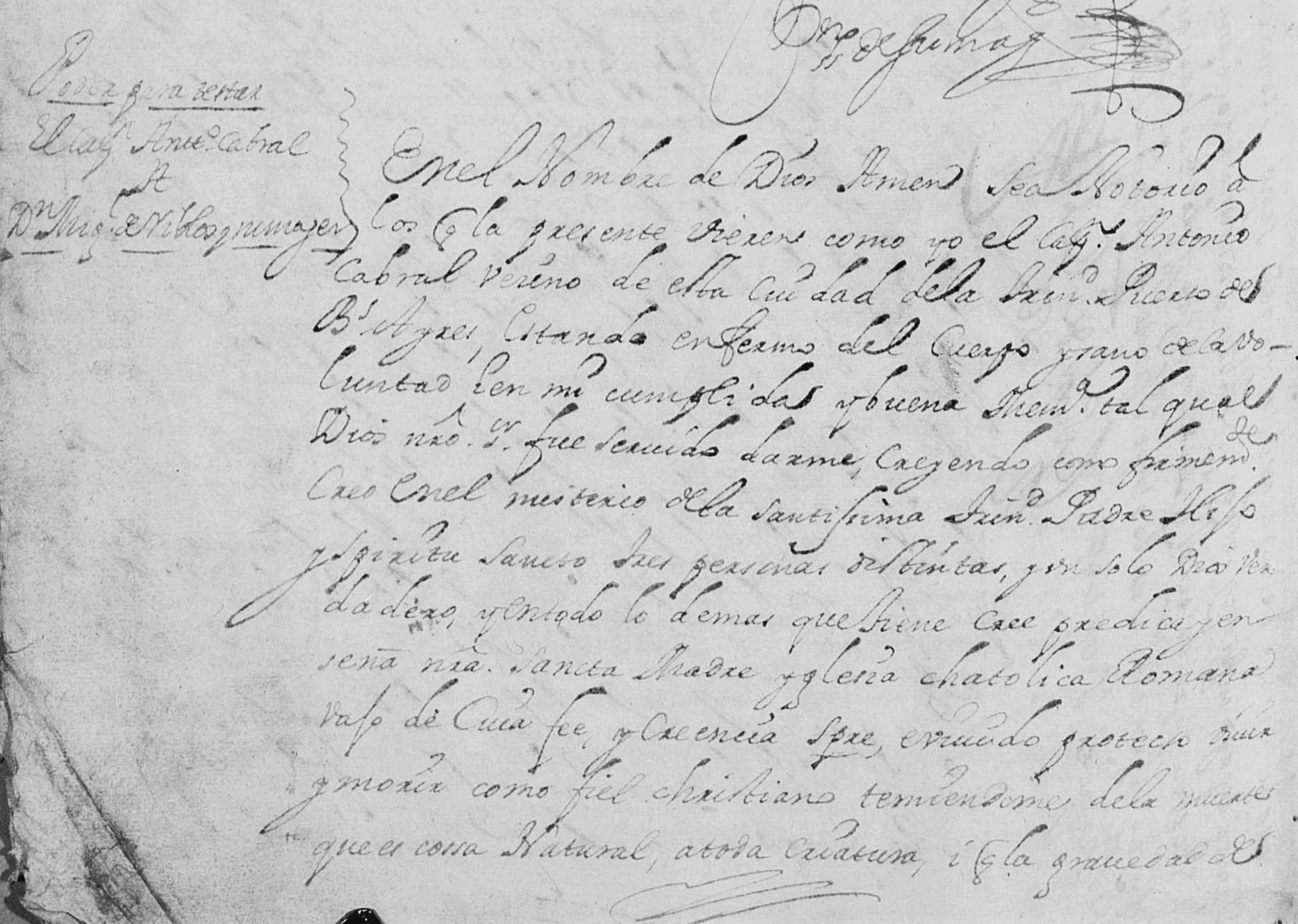
Testament of Antonio Cabral de Melo

Antonio Román Cabral de Melo y Carbajal was born in Buenos Aires to Cristóbal Cabral de Melo, a nobleman from Vila do Porto, and María de Carbajal, a member of a distinguished family. He was baptized on March 11, 1646, with Captain Diego Gutiérrez de Humanes and Leonor Carbajal serving as his godparents.

He married Leonor Morales, the daughter of Pedro Morales y Mercado and Mariana de Manzanares. Their wedding took place in Buenos Aires' Cathedral Mayor on July 13, 1671, with Juan Báez de Alpoim and Gerónima Cabral in attendance as godparents and relatives of the groom.

Cabral de Melo likely completed his studies at the Jesuit College of the City around the age of 18 or 20. For most of his life, he focused on livestock raising, agriculture, and viticulture. He owned numerous haciendas, one of which was centrally located in Buenos Aires Province. In 1668, Cabral de Melo requested permission from the Ayuntamiento to hunt 3,000 head of cattle in the area of Luján, which belonged to his mother, Doña María de Carbajal.

Like many of his relatives, Cabral de Melo actively participated in the provincial militias based at the Fort of Buenos Aires. He joined several military expeditions against tribes in the Pampas region and held the position of Maestre de Campo, leading the provincial militias of the Spanish Army. Around 1690, the town council authorized him to slaughter the wild cattle within the jurisdiction of Buenos Aires Province, making him an accionero.

The cattle accioneros (roughly translated as "stockholders") of the Río de la Plata supplied meat and leather to Buenos Aires during the 17th and 18th centuries. Following the extinction of feral cattle in Buenos Aires Province, the accioneros focused solely on raising cattle on their own haciendas, trading their products with the Compañía Guipuzcoana and Compañía de Filipinas. They also oversaw the export of leather through the Compañía de Guinea de Francia and Asiento de Inglaterra until 1740.

In 1707, Antonio Cabral de Melo gave the power to write his will to Miguel de Riglos, a personal friend of the Cabral de Melo family. Miguel de Riglos was the nephew of Manuel Cabral de Alpoim, a prominent rancher and military leader of Portuguese origin, who had a distinguished career in the Río de la Plata, where he served as Mayor and Lieutenant Governor of Corrientes.

The title of accionero was inheritable. As such, after Antonio Cabral de Melo’s death around 1717, the right to hunt feral cattle passed to his son-in-law, Don Miguel Gerónimo de Esparza.
