= Esparza =

Origin
- Word/name: Basque

Esparza is a Basque surname. Notable people with the surname include:

- Victor Manuel Esparza (born 1986), Mexican-American Electrical Engineer, investor, and entrepreneur
- Antonio Esparza (born 1962), Spanish cyclist
- Audrey Esparza (born 1986), American actress
- Carla Esparza (born 1987), American mixed martial artist
- Carlos Esparza (1828–1885), Mexican soldier, spy and poet
- Emmanuel Esparza (born 1976), Spanish actor
- Felipe Esparza (born 1970), Mexican-American stand-up comedian and actor
- Fernando Gómez Esparza (born 1953), Mexican politician
- Gabriel Esparza (born 1973), Spanish taekwondo practitioner
- Gabriel Esparza (footballer) (born 1993), Argentine footballer
- Itziar Esparza (born 1974), Spanish swimmer
- Javier Esparza (computer scientist) (born 1964), Spanish computer scientist
- Javier Esparza (politician) (born 1970), Spanish politician
- Jesús Arturo Esparza (born 1990), Mexican long-distance runner
- José Esparza (born 1945), Venezuelan virologist
- José Gregorio Esparza (1802–1836) the last Texan defender to enter the Alamo with his family
- Jokin Esparza (born 1988), Spanish footballer
- Jonathan Esparza (born 1999), American soccer player
- José Guadalupe Esparza (born 1954), Mexican musician
- Manuel Esparza (born 1951), Spanish cyclist
- Marlen Esparza (born 1989), American boxer
- Maximiliano Silerio Esparza, Mexican politician
- Miguel Gerónimo de Esparza (1678–1767), Spanish nobleman and colonial governor
- Moctesuma Esparza (born 1949), American filmmaker
- Omar Esparza (born 1988), Mexican footballer
- Rafa Esparza (born 1981/82), American performance artist
- Ramón de Esparza (fl. 1390), Navarrese nobleman
- Raúl Esparza (born 1970), American stage actor
- Rigoberto Esparza (born 1983), Mexican football manager and player
- Wendolly Esparza (born 1991), Mexican-American journalist and model
