= Pedro de Roxas y Acevedo =

Spanish military officer and politician

General Pedro de Roxas y Acevedo

Interim Governor of the Río de la Plata and Paraguay
- In office 1641–1641
- Preceded by: Andrés de Sandoval
- Succeeded by: Jerónimo Luis de Cabrera

Lieutenant Governor of Buenos Aires
- In office 1641–1642
- Preceded by: Juan Bernardo de la Cueva
- Succeeded by: Luis de Aresti

Vice-Mayor of Buenos Aires
- In office 1626–1627
- Preceded by: Antonio Gutiérrez Barragán
- Succeeded by: Francisco García Romero

Escribano of the Cabildo of Buenos Aires
- In office 1620–1626
- Preceded by: Jerónimo de Medrano
- Succeeded by: Alonso Agreda de Vergara

Personal details
- Born: c. 1594 Canary Islands, Spain
- Died: c. 1670 Buenos Aires, Argentina
- Spouse: María de Vega
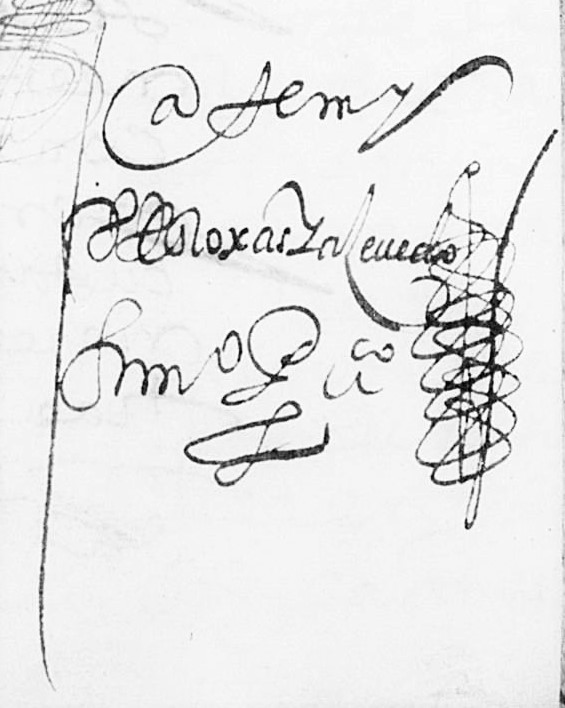
- Signature

Military service
- Allegiance: Spanish Empire
- Branch/service: Spanish Army
- Years of service: c. 1614–1660s
- Rank: General
- Unit: Fuerte de Buenos Aires

Pedro de Roxas Acevedo (c. 1594–1670s) was a Spanish military officer, and politician, who served in Buenos Aires and Asunción holding honorary positions, including the post of Governor of the Río de la Plata and Paraguay, on an interim term between January 8, 1641, to July 17, 1641.

== Biography ==
He was born in Garachico (Tenerife, Spain), son of Amador de Acevedo and Catalina de Roxas, natives of Madrid. He had arrived at the Río de la Plata from Cádiz in 1612. After establishing himself in the city, he held the post of notary public of the Cabildo of Buenos Aires in 1620.

He was elected alcalde in second vote in 1626, and also served as regidor of the Ayuntamiento. In 1641, Roxas was appointed as lieutenant governor of Buenos Aires, being designated that same year to occupy of interim form the governorship of the Río de la Plata.

Pedro de Roxas Acevedo was married to doña María de Vega, daughter of Diego de Vega and Blanca de Vasconcelos. His sons, Thomas de Roxas and Amador de Roxas, were two important political officials of the 17th century . He and his family received very large land grants in Buenos Aires, being considered one of the richest men of his time.
