= Thomas de Roxas =

Captain Thomas de Roxas

Vice-Mayor of Buenos Aires
- In office 1654–1655
- Monarch: Philip IV of Spain
- Preceded by: Fernando Ñuño del Aguila
- Succeeded by: Jacinto Vela de Hinojosa

Procurador General of Buenos Aires
- In office 1648–1649
- Monarch: Philip IV of Spain
- Preceded by: Sebastián Flores de Santa Cruz
- Succeeded by: Esteban de Acosta

Personal details
- Born: 20 March 1626 Buenos Aires, Argentina
- Died: 11 November 1668 (aged 42) Madrid, Spain
- Occupation: army politician
- Profession: Army officer

Military service
- Allegiance: Spain
- Branch/service: Spanish Army
- Years of service: c. 1645-1660s
- Rank: Captain
- Unit: Fuerte de Buenos Aires

Thomas de Roxas Acevedo (1626-1668) was a Spanish politician and military man, who served as member of the city council as alcalde and regidor of Buenos Aires.

== Biography ==
He was born in Buenos Aires, the son of Pedro de Roxas y Acevedo and María de Vega, born in Santiago del Estero. After completing his elementary studies, he served in the militia, reaching the Captain degree of the Presidio de Buenos Aires.

He was appointed as Síndico Procurador General of the city in 1648, and was elected as alcalde of the 2nd vote of Buenos Aires in 1654. He also served as alférez real, mayordomo and regidor of the Cabildo of Buenos Aires.

Thomas de Roxas y Acevedo was involved in illegal trade in the Río de la Plata. His grandfather Diego de Vega, was a known smuggler, who served as banker of Buenos Aires towards the beginning of the 17th century.
