= Rodrigo de Sosa =

Councilman in Argentina (1600s–1669)

Personal details
- Born: Rodrigo de Sosa León y Peralta Cabrera; 1600s Córdoba
- Died: 1669 Buenos Aires
- Occupation: Functionary
- Profession: Military

Rodrigo de Sosa (1600s–1669) was a soldier and alcalde of the province of Cordoba.

== Biography ==
Born in Córdoba, present Argentina, was the son of the Portuguese Ruy de Sosa and Gregoria Peralta and maternal grandson of Blas de Peralta. Rodrigo Sosa married in Buenos Aires to Margarita Monsalve daughter of Juan Montes de Oca and Francisca de Santa Cruz daughter of Francisco García Romero.

The Cap. Rodrigo Sosa served as councilman in cabildo of Córdoba. In 1635 was appointed alcalde de la Santa Hermandad.
