= Alfonso Rodríguez (captain) =

Spanish mariner and merchant

Capitán Alfonso Rodríguez

Personal details
- Born: Alfonso del Trovo Rodríguez y Vasanta c. 1605 Galicia, Spain
- Died: c. 1680 Buenos Aires, Viceroyalty of Peru
- Spouse: Ana Gil Martínez
- Children: Escolástica Rodríguez; Leocadia Rodríguez; Ana Rodríguez
- Relatives: Alejo de Esparza (son-in-law)
- Occupation: army merchant
- Profession: military man
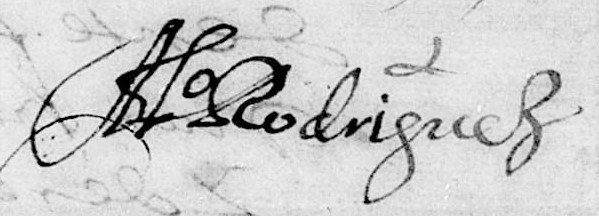
- Signature

Military service
- Allegiance: Spanish Empire
- Branch/service: Spanish Navy
- Years of service: c. 1620 – c. 1680
- Rank: Captain
- Unit: Fuerte de Buenos Aires

Alfonso Rodríguez was a Spanish mariner and merchant, who was colonizer in the cities of Rio de Janeiro and Buenos Aires in the 1620s. He served as a captain of commercial ships, having an active participation in the commerce of Río de la Plata towards the middle of the 17th century.

He was born in Galicia, Spain, son of Juan de Trovo Rodríguez and Inés de Vasanta. He arrived in the Río de la Plata in the early 1600s from Rio de Janeiro, where he had lived a few years. Installed in Buenos Aires he participated in the economic activities of Río de la Plata as a naval merchant.

He was married in Buenos Aires, to Ana de la Trinidad Martínez, daughter of Juan Gil de Freytas and María Martínez, possibly belonging to families established in the City during the second foundation of Buenos Aires by Juan de Garay. His wife's family was linked to Manuel de Frías, a distinguished military man born in Asunción, who held various political posts in the Río de la Plata, including that of lieutenant governor of Buenos Aires.

His wife Ana de la Trinidad Martínez y Gil de Freytas was the direct maternal ancestor (mitochondrial line) of distinguished Argentine politicians and military, including Juan Lucio Somoza, Sinforoso Amoedo, Juan Manuel Bayá, Apolinario Linera, Juan José Canaveris and Miguel Gerónimo de Esparza y Rodríguez. She was possibly the granddaughter of Francisco Martínez and Juana Luys de Luque, granddaughter of Magdalena Elvira Hernández de los Reyes, a Spanish woman, married in Asunción to the Conquistador Benito Luys de Figueroa, born in Porto.
