= Alonso Muñoz de Gadea =

Capitán Alonso Muñoz de Gadea

Vice-Mayor of Buenos Aires
- In office 1671–1672
- Preceded by: Pedro Pesoa de Figueroa
- Succeeded by: Marcos Gutiérrez de Vargas

Procurador General of Buenos Aires
- In office 1673–1674
- Preceded by: José Gil Negrete
- Succeeded by: Bernardino Rodríguez de Sosa

Mayordomo and Administrador de las Rentas of the Catedral de Buenos Aires
- In office c.1690–c.1700
- Preceded by: ?
- Succeeded by: ?

Personal details
- Born: c.1630 Lima, Viceroyalty of Peru
- Died: 1708 Buenos Aires, Governorate of the Río de la Plata
- Spouse: Francisca Cabral de Ayala
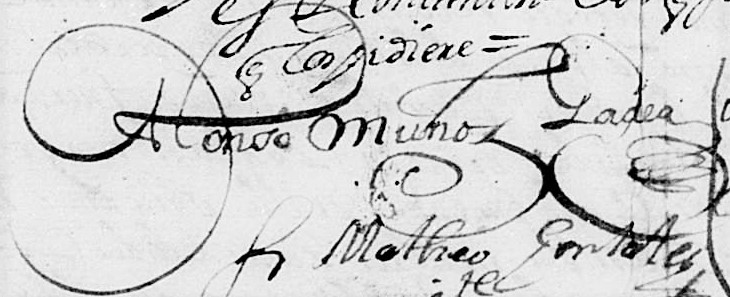
- Signature

Military service
- Allegiance: Spain
- Branch/service: Spanish Army
- Years of service: 1650-c.1700
- Rank: Captain
- Unit: Fuerte de Buenos Aires
- Commands: Milicias de Santiago; Milicias de Buenos Aires

Alonso Muñoz de Gadea (1630s-1708) was a Spanish politician, accountant and military officer who served in Buenos Aires during the Viceroyalty of Peru as Alcalde, Procurador and Mayordomo of the Cathedral Mayor of the city.

== Biography ==
He was born in Lima (Viceroyalty of Peru), the son of Juan de Gadea and Josefa Muñoz, belonging to a family of Spanish Creole origin. He studied in Lima, and settled in Buenos Aires around 1650, where he married Francisca Cabral de Ayala, daughter of Juan Cabral de Melo y Alpoin and Inés Leal de Ayala, belonging to a noble family of Buenos Aires.

He was elected alcalde of 2nd vote of Buenos Aires in 1671, and served procurator of the city in 1673, and appointed to the post of Mayordomo of the Church of Buenos Aires in 1690. He also had an active participation in the Provincial Militias of Buenos Aires and Santiago, where he served as commander of the military detachments of those cities.

== Family ==
Alonso Muñoz de Gadea and his wife had two adoptive daughters, Inés Muñoz de Gadea Ayala, who was married to Capt. Tomás de Quiñones, and Agueda de Gadea, wife of Bernardino Ramírez de Céspedes, an alférez, born in the city, son of Juan Ramírez, born in Málaga and Josefa de Rivera, daughter of Andrés Jorge de Bohórquez and Francisca de Rivera.

His wife was a maternal granddaughter of Mateo Leal de Ayala, a distinguished Spanish politician who served as Governor and Mayor of Buenos Aires.
