= Domingo Gribeo =

Spanish military man

Domingo Gribeo y Martín

Mayordomo of Buenos Aires
- In office 1607–1608
- Monarch: Philip III
- Preceded by: ?
- Succeeded by: ?

Personal details
- Born: 1558 Asunción, Paraguay
- Died: 1649 (aged 90–91) Buenos Aires, Argentina
- Occupation: Politician
- Profession: Army's officer
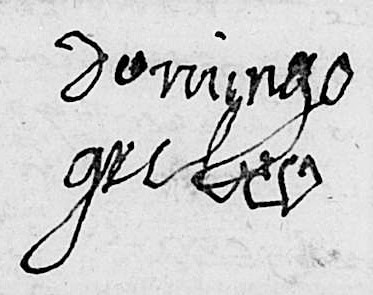
- Signature

Military service
- Allegiance: Spain
- Branch/service: Spanish Army
- Rank: Captain

Domingo Gribeo y Martin (1558–1649) was a Spanish military man who served during the Viceroyalty of Peru as mayordomo of hospital, and regidor of Buenos Aires.

== Biography ==
Gribeo was born in Asunción, son of Leonardo Gribeo and Isabel Martín, daughter of Manuel Martin, a Spanish conquistador who served as notary public of Asuncion. Domingo Gribeo was married to María Esterlín, daughter of Rodrigo de Esterlín and Juana de Solórzano, belonging to Creole families, among whose many ancestors were the conquerors Arnao Esterlin and Zoilo de Solórzano, born in the Islas Canarias.

Domingo had inherited the land from his brother Lazaro Gribeo, neighbor founder of Buenos Aires, companion of Juan de Garay in the second foundation of the city.
