= Francisco de Cabrera =

Spanish merchant and politician

Captain Francisco de Cabrera

Vice-Mayor of Buenos Aires
- In office 1762–1763
- Monarch: Charles III of Spain
- Preceded by: Antonio de Velasco
- Succeeded by: Ignacio de Irigoyen y Echenique

Procurador General of Buenos Aires
- In office 1761–1762
- Preceded by: Antonio de Velasco Quintana
- Succeeded by: Eugenio Lerdo de Tejada

Personal details
- Born: Francisco de Cabrera y Dávalos; 1718 Granada, Spain
- Died: 1787 (aged 68–69) Buenos Aires, Viceroyalty of the Río de la Plata
- Occupation: army politician merchant
- Profession: jurist
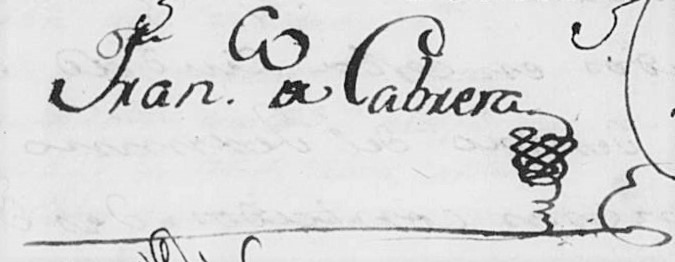
- Signature

Military service
- Allegiance: Spanish Empire
- Branch/service: Spanish Army
- Years of service: 1738–1767
- Rank: Captain
- Unit: Fuerte de Buenos Aires

Francisco de Cabrera (1718–1787) was a Spanish merchant and politician, who served as regidor, alcalde and prosecutor of Buenos Aires during the Viceroyalty of Peru.

== Biography ==
Cabrera was born in Granada, Andalusia (Spain), son of Francisco de Cabrera and María Ignacia Dávalos. He was married on June 13, 1741, with to Antonia Isabel de Saavedra, born in Buenos Aires, daughter of Bernardo de Saavedra and Ana de la Palma Lobatón.

In the position of procurator of the city, Cabrera made important services to the community of Buenos Aires, defending the interests of its inhabitants and the Council. He integrated the distinguished group of influential neighbors of the viceroyalty, that included Gregorio Ramos Mexía and Francisco Antonio de Escalada, two of the most important politicians of Buenos Aires.

Exercising the position of mayor of Buenos Aires, he participated in the debates about the wars against Portugal and England (Anglo-Spanish War). On March 22, 1762, the City Council entrusted him to inform the King of Spain of the funeral honors performed in Buenos Aires to the Queen Maria Amalia of Saxony.

Francisco de Cabrera and his wife were the parents of Toribia María Francisca Cabrera, married to his relative Cornelio Saavedra, an Argentine patriot, who was appointed president of the Primera Junta of government of the United Provinces of the Río de la Plata in 1810. His grandson, Pedro Medrano Cabrera, was Deputy in the Congress of Tucumán of the July 9, 1816.
