= Rodrigo de Esparza =

Basque nobleman, mosén and chamberlain of King Charles III of Navarre

- Chamberlain
- Coat of Arms of Esparza
- Born: 14th century Kingdom of Navarre
- Died: 15th century Kingdom of Navarre

Rodrigo de Esparza (13?-1423) was a Basque nobleman, Mosén and Chamberlain of King Charles III of Navarre.

== Biography ==
Born in Navarra. Mosén Rodrigo de Esparza was benefited by the King, who awarded him the annual revenues of the cities of Cintruénigo and Arguedas. He also was granted the right of patronage on the churches of Ezcároz, Esparza, Sarriés and Ibilcieta (Merindad de Sangüesa).

In 1390, Rodrigo de Esparza was the head of the Alcaldia, in Castle of Cintruénigo (Merindad de Tudela).

Esparza had a son Ramón de Esparza, Lord of the palace Esparza, who served as Captain of the Navarrese domains in Cherbourg (Normandy).
