= Mateo Leal de Ayala =

Spanish army officer and politician

General Mateo Leal de Ayala
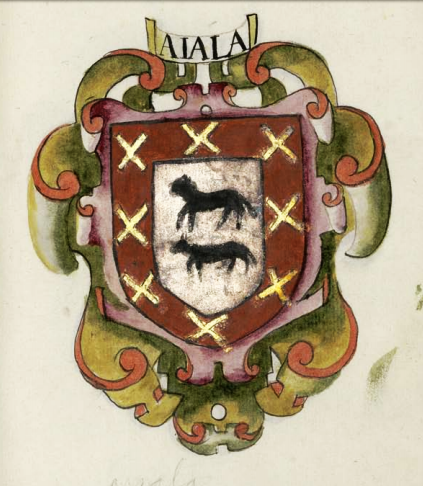
- Coat of Arms of Ayala

Governor of Buenos Aires
- In office 1613–1615
- Preceded by: Diego Marín de Negrón
- Succeeded by: Francés de Beaumont y Navarra

Lieutenant Governor of Buenos Aires
- In office 1612–1613
- Preceded by: Manuel de Frías
- Succeeded by: Juan de Aguinaga

Mayor of Buenos Aires
- In office 1621–1622
- Preceded by: Francisco García Romero
- Succeeded by: Pedro de Izarra

Vice-Mayor of Buenos Aires
- In office 1612–1612
- Preceded by: Felipe Navarro
- Succeeded by: Francisco de Manzanares y Dardos

Personal details
- Born: November 20, 1579 Madrid, Spain
- Died: 1627 (aged 47–48) Buenos Aires, Viceroyalty of Peru
- Spouse: María Magdalena de Aguilar
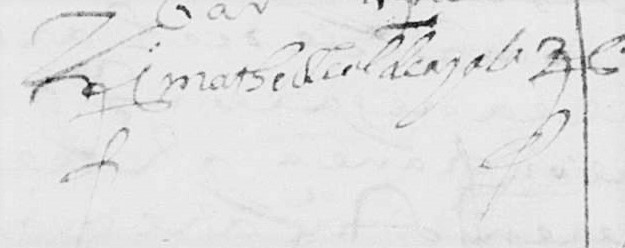
- Signature

Military service
- Allegiance: Spanish Empire
- Branch/service: Spanish Army
- Years of service: 1600-1627
- Rank: General
- Unit: Fuerte de Buenos Aires

Mateo Leal de Ayala (1579–1627) was a Spanish army officer and politician, who served during the Viceroyalty of Peru as alcalde, teniente de gobernador and gobernador of Buenos Aires and Paraguay.

== Biography ==
Mateo Leal de Ayala y Medina was born in Madrid (Spain), son of Isidro Leal de Ayala and Rosa de Medina, belonging to a distinguished family of La Cabrera. He possibly studied in Spain, and settled in the Spanish Colonies of America around 1598. He was married in the city of Potosí with María Magdalena de Aguilar, a noble woman, daughter of Ginés Martínez and Leonor de Vargas.

In early seventeenth century, Ayala arrived at Buenos Aires from the Peru, and acquired a large estate of 500 rods of land, in the area of Pago de la Matanza. In Buenos Aires, he held the highest political positions, being designated the 27 of December 1613 as governor of the Río de la Plata and Paraguay. He also served as alguazil mayor of the city, and was elected alcalde in first vote of Buenos Aires in 1621.
