= Sarries =

Sarries may refer to:

- Saracens F.C., a rugby club in London, England
- Part of the Sarriés – Sartze municipality in Navarre, Spain
