= Gonzalo Carbajal =

Spanish nobleman

General Gonzalo de Carbajal
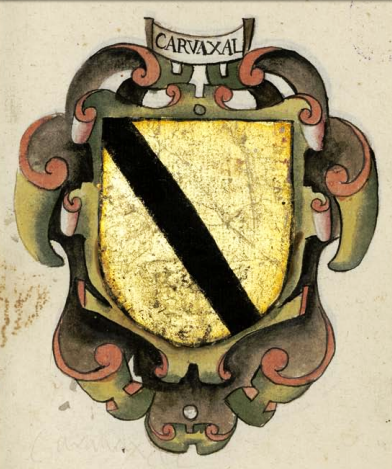
- arms of Carbajal

Mayor of Buenos Aires
- In office 1628–1629
- Preceded by: Juan de Céspedes
- Succeeded by: Pedro Gutiérrez

Vice-Mayor of Buenos Aires
- In office 1617–1618
- Preceded by: Juan Nieto de Humanes
- Succeeded by: Francisco Muñoz

Lieutenant Governor of Santa Fe
- In office 1622–1623
- Preceded by: ?
- Succeeded by: ?

Personal details
- Born: c.1590 Lima, Perú
- Died: 1661 Buenos Aires, Argentina
- Spouse: María de Salas y Reynoso
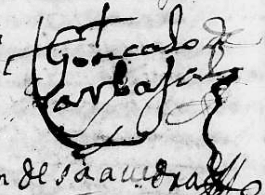
- Signature

Military service
- Allegiance: Spain
- Branch/service: Spanish Army
- Years of service: 1610-1660
- Rank: General
- Unit: Milicias provinciales

Gonzalo de Carbajal (c.1590 –1661) was a Spanish nobleman. He occupied military and political positions during the Viceroyalty of Peru, being Mayor of Buenos Aires, and Lieutenant governor of Santa Fe Province.

== Biography ==
Carbajal was born in Ciudad de los Reyes, (Lima, Perú), son of Pedro López Valero and María de Carbajal, belonging to a noble family of Conquistadors from Extremadura. He was married to María Salas, daughter of Francisco de Salas Reynoso and Leonor Correa, a family of Castilian and Andalusian roots.

Carbajal took part in military expeditions commanded by Hernandarias de Saavedra, Governor of Río de la Plata. He also had served in expeditions against the Aboriginal tribes, in almost all provinces including Salta, Corrientes and Santa Fe Province. And served as a leader of armed contingents in support of Juan de Garay (son of the founder) against Indian tribes in the city of Concepción de Buena Esperanza.

In 1612 Carbajal dedicated himself to inspection and control of the commercial activity of the Río de la Plata, when he was appointed as Faithful Executor of the Cabildo de Buenos Aires. Later in 1617, he served as Alcalde of 2nd vote of the City. That same year he held the honorary position of Alférez Real, being responsible for carrying the Royal Standard, during the day of St. Martin, and in official ceremonies.

In 1628, Carbajal was appointed as Mayor of first vote of Buenos Aires, and Pedro Sánchez Garzón, held the position of the second vote. On September 6, 1628 the City Council, gave debate about a skirmish that occurred with a Dutch warship on the shores of the Río de la Plata.

Gonzalo de Carbajal served since May 21, 1622 as Lieutenant Governor of Santa Fe Province. Some time later he served as Lieutenant Governor and General in Buenos Aires. He also fulfilled the functions of Treasurer, Council and Royal Official in the Río de la Plata. And on November 9, 1631, he was appointed Judge Campaign.

He had owned one of the first pulperías, in the Río de la Plata. His establishment was administered by a black woman named Catalina. His daughters, Leonor and María were married to Diego Gutiérrez de Humanes and Cristóbal Cabral de Melo, belonging to families of noble lineage of Spanish and Lusitanian origin.
