= Ruy de Sosa =

Portuguese nobleman, conqueror and government official

Ruy de Sosa y León

Personal details
- Born: 1569 Lisbon, Portugal
- Died: 1633 (aged 63–64) Oruro, Bolivia
- Children: Rodrigo de Sosa
- Occupation: Military

Ruy de Sosa y León, (Portuguese: Rui de Sousa e Leão; 1569–1633) was a Portuguese nobleman, and conqueror and government official of the city of Córdoba in what is now Argentina during the Spanish colonization of the Americas.

== Biography ==
Born in 1569 in Lisbon, Portugal, he was the son of Garcia Sousa and Dona Isabel Nunes. He married in the city of Córdoba to Gregoria Peralta, daughter of Blas de Peralta.

Ruy de Sosa arrived in Córdoba from Peru sent as conqueror and councilman, was appointed chief alguacil, attorney, majordomo and city treasurer.
