= Antón Higueras de Santana =

Captain Anton Higueras de Santana

Alcalde of Buenos Aires
- In office 1592–1593
- Monarch: Philip II
- Preceded by: Pedro de Izarra
- Succeeded by: Francisco Perez de Burgos

Alcalde of Buenos Aires
- In office 1618–1619
- Monarch: Philip III
- Preceded by: Cristóbal Naharro
- Succeeded by: Francisco García Romero

Personal details
- Born: 1557 Sevilla, Andalucia, Spain
- Died: 1619 (aged 61–62) Buenos Aires, Viceroyalty of Peru
- Occupation: conquistador politician
- Profession: Army officer
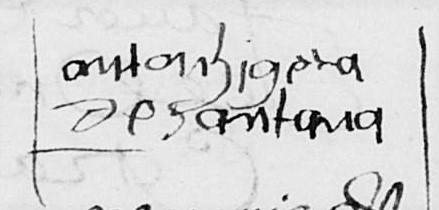
- Signature

Military service
- Allegiance: Spain
- Branch/service: Spanish Army
- Years of service: c.1570-c.1619
- Rank: Captain
- Unit: Fuerte de Buenos Aires

Anton Higueras de Santana (1557–1619) was a Spanish Captain, who served as expeditionary and conquistador. He participated in the second foundation of Buenos Aires, holding honorary positions as mayor and alderman of the Buenos Aires Cabildo.

== Biography ==
He was born in Salteras, Sevilla, son of Pedro Correa de Santana and Antonia Morena, belonging to an old Andalusian family. He had arrived in the Río de la Plata, in the expedition of Ortiz de Zárate, accompanied by his mother, and his sisters Maria Correa, Catherine Correa, Isabel and Leonor Correa de Santana, according to the shipping records, a nice woman with blond hair and blue eyes. His father Pedro Correa, had died in his hometown.

Santana belonged to the first contingent of founding neighbors of Buenos Aires, who had been arrived with Juan de Garay from Santa Fe. He had served under Garay in military expeditiones against native populations. Towards the year of 1590, he was in charge of a caravan of wagons from the territory of San Miguel de Tucumán and Córdoba to the city of Buenos Aires.

Soon after settling in Buenos Aires, Santana began to hold Council positions in the city, serving as regidor in 1589, and lieutenant governor for 1595. Then he held the position of faithful executor, and served as alcalde of first vote of Buenos Aires in 1592 and 1618.

Like all the founding neighbors, Anton Higueras de Santana had received land grants. He owned a ranch located in the town of Las Conchas (Buenos Aires Province). He had two natural daughters, one of them was Beatriz Morena de Santana (wife of Francisco Rodriguez).
