= Alfonso Rodriguez =

Alfonso Rodriguez may refer to:

- Alphonsus Rodriguez (1532–1617), Jesuit brother, Roman Catholic Saint
- Alfonso Rodríguez Olmedo (1598–1628), Spanish Jesuit priest and martyr
- Alonso Rodriguez (1538–1616), author of Ejercicio de Perfección y Virtudes Cristianas, or Practice of Perfection and Christian Virtues, sometimes translated as The Practice of Christian and Religious Perfection
- Alfonso Rodriguez Jr. (born 1953), American sentenced to death penalty for murder
- Alfonso Rodríguez (director) (born 1957), Dominican actor, writer and director
- Alfonso Rodríguez (gymnast) (born 1965), Spanish Olympic gymnast
- Alfonso Rodríguez (captain), 17th-century Spanish mariner and merchant
- Alfonso Rodríguez (sport shooter) (born 1929), Colombian sport shooter
- Alfonso Rodríguez (weightlifter) (born 1948), Puerto Rican Olympic weightlifter
- Alfonso Rodríguez Salas (1939–1994), Spanish footballer
- Alfonso Rodríguez (athlete), Mexican athlete in 1977 Central American and Caribbean Championships in Athletics
