= Francisco Pérez de Burgos =

Spanish conquistador (1558–1617)

Escribano Don Francisco Pérez de Burgos
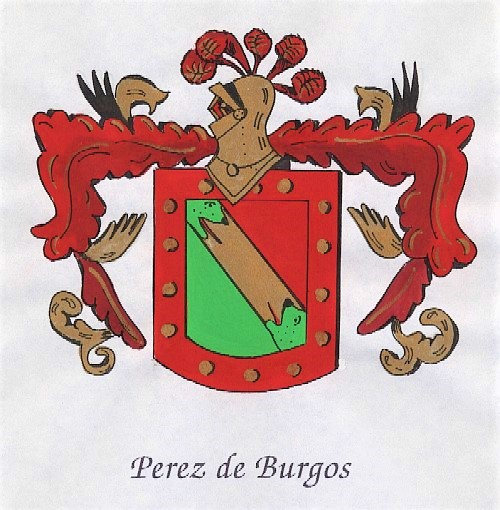
- Coat of Arms of Pérez de Burgos

Escribano Mayor de Gobierno of the Río de la Plata
- In office 1589–1607
- Monarch: Philip III of Spain
- Preceded by: Antón García Caro
- Succeeded by: Manuel Martin

Alcalde of Buenos Aires
- In office 1593–1594
- Monarch: Philip II of Spain
- Preceded by: ?
- Succeeded by: ?

Personal details
- Born: Francisco Pérez de Burgos y Martínez; 1558 Cádiz, Andalusia, Spain
- Died: 1617 (aged 58–59) Buenos Aires, Argentina
- Spouse: Juana de Aguilar y Salvatierra
- Occupation: notary government army farmer
- Profession: jurist
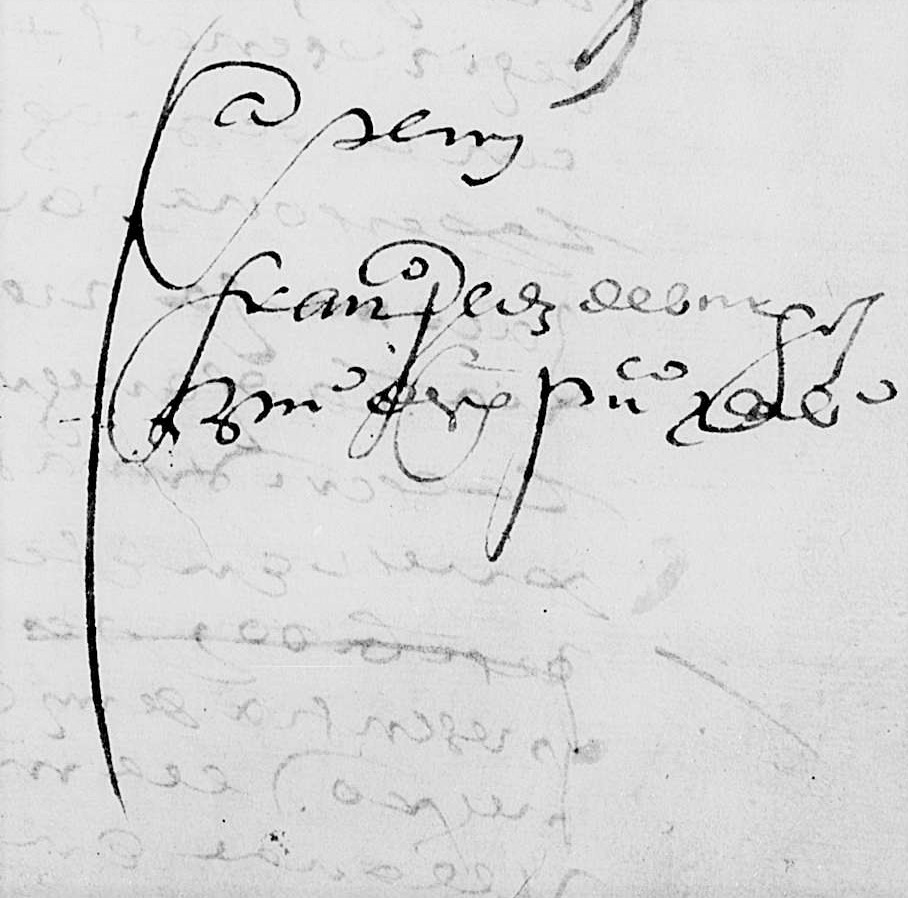
- Signature

Military service
- Allegiance: Spanish Empire
- Branch/service: Spanish Army
- Years of service: 1581-1610
- Rank: Captain
- Unit: Fuerte de Buenos Aires

Francisco Pérez de Burgos (1558-1617) was a Spanish jurist, military man, merchant and politician, who had a preponderant role during the colonial period of Argentina, where he worked as a public and government notary of the city of Buenos Aires.

He was appointed Escribano Real for his Majesty Felipe II de España, and held various honorary posts in the territories of the Viceroyalty of Peru, including as Mayor of Buenos Aires and Corrientes, Notary public, and Regidor of the Cabildo of Buenos Aires.

== Biography ==
He was born in Jerez de la Frontera, Cádiz, Spain, the son of Diego Pérez de Burgos and Beatriz Martínez de Tremal, belonging to a distinguished Andalusian family. He possibly did his studies in Seville, and arrival in the Río de La Plata from Cádiz in 1581. He lived in Asunción and settled in Buenos Aires in 1583, where he married Juana de Aguilar y Salvatierra, daughter of Leonor de Zamora and her first husband Andrés Gil, natives of Ronda.

Burgos was the successor of Antón García Caro, in the position of notary of Buenos Aires. He served as notary public and of Cabildo until 1606, being replaced by Manuel Martin. In 1606, Burgos presented before the City Council, his title of Royal Notary of the Spanish Indies, signed on February 11, 1581 by the King Philip II of Spain.

He had an active participation as a government notary in the Río de la Plata. In 1584 he officiated the notarial deed in the interrogation conducted by Conquistador Don Juan de Torres de Vera y Aragón, against three English pirates, who had been persecuted by the Charruas Indians in the territory of Santa Fe Province. One of these pirates was John Drake, the nephew of Francis Drake.

Burgos belonged to the second contingent of settlers established in the city of Buenos Aires. He also living in the provinces of San Miguel de Tucumán, Santa Fe and Corrientes. In 1596, he was appointed by Juan Ramírez de Velasco, to exercise the position of Alcalde and Justicia Mayor of Corrientes.

Francisco Pérez de Burgos also served as Mayor of Buenos Aires, and Captain in the Fuerte de Buenos Aires. In 1614 he was elected regidor and appointed as fiel ejecutor of Buenos Aires, being replaced in that position on July 21 of that year by Francisco García Romero, a politician born in Extremadura. He continued to serve as deputy of the City Council of Buenos Aires until 1616, and died in the same city on July 21, 1617.

He also devoted himself to agriculture and took part in the hunting of cimarron cattle in the Province of Buenos Aires. In 1604 he received land grants in the Paraná River by Hernando Arias de Saavedra, governor of Buenos Aires. He was the owner of a farm located on the Riachuelo to the south of the city.

The passage of Burgos (pasaje de Burgos) today Puente Alsina, owes its name to Francisco Pérez de Burgos. During the British invasions of the Río de la Plata, the Burgos passage was crossed by the English troops to enter the city of Buenos Aires.

== Family ==
Francisco Pérez de Burgos were the parents of numerous sons and daughters, among them Leonor de Aguilar Pérez de Burgos, who was married to Francisco de Manzanares y Dardos, a Spanish official born in Toledo, and Catalina Burgos de Aguilar y Salvatierra, wife of Juan Rodriguez de Estela, among whose descendants are Feliciano Pueyrredón and Juan Martín de Pueyrredón.

The lineage of the Pérez de Burgos family possibly has its origin in Garci Perez de Burgos or Ferrán Pérez de Burgos, a Spanish nobleman from Burgos, who participated in the Conquista of Jerez de la Frontera, and who served as vassal of the Kings of Castile.
