= Francisco de Salas Reynoso =

Former mayor of Buenos Aires, Argentina

Captain Francisco de Salas
- arms of Salas

Lieutenant Governor of Buenos Aires
- In office 1603–1604
- Preceded by: Francés de Beaumont y Navarra
- Succeeded by: Manuel de Frias

Mayor of Buenos Aires
- In office 1613–1614
- Preceded by: Víctor Casco de Mendoza
- Succeeded by: Juan de Vergara

Vice-mayor of Buenos Aires
- In office 1608–1609
- Preceded by: Cristóbal Perez de Arostegui
- Succeeded by: Pedro Hurtado

Personal details
- Born: Francisco de Salas Videla y Reynoso; 16th century Esquivias, Toledo, Spain
- Died: 17th century Buenos Aires, Argentina
- Spouse: Leonor Correa de Santana
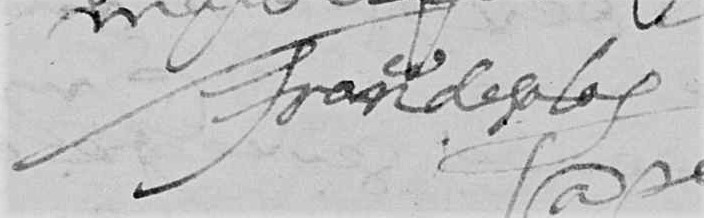
- Signature

Military service
- Allegiance: Spain
- Branch/service: Spanish Army
- Rank: Captain

Francisco de Salas (?-?) was a Spanish military man and politician, who served as captain, mayor, councillor, lieutenant governor, and justice major in the Ciudad de Trinidad y Puerto de Buenos Aires.

== Biography ==
Francisco de Salas Videla Reynoso was born in Esquivias, Toledo, Spain, son of Juan de Salas and Susana de Barahona, belonging to a noble Spanish family. He was married in Buenos Aires to Leonor Correa de Santana, daughter of Pedro Correa and Antonia Moreno, natives of Andalusia. His wife was a niece of Anton Higueras de Santana, who arrived at the Río de la Plata in the expedition of Juan Ortiz de Zárate.

After settling in the Río de la Plata, Francisco de Salas served as a royal official. His first public office was perhaps as a regidor of Buenos Aires, a position he held in 1590. That same year, he was designated as fiel ejecutor (dedicated to the control of commercial activities).

In 1602 he was appointed lieutenant governor and justice major of the Río de la Plata. And in 1606 was council of the city. In 1608 he served as mayor of second vote, and was elected mayor of the first vote of the city of Buenos Aires on January 1, 1613.

Francisco Salas Reynoso held the honorary position of Alférez Real on several occasions, being in charge of carrying the royal standard, and the organization of the festival in honor of Saint Martin of Tours.
