= Joseph Blás de Gainza =

Spanish Merchant and Politician, born 1725

Alcalde of Buenos Aires
- In office 1763–1764
- Monarch: Charles III of Spain
- Preceded by: Miguel de Zubiria
- Succeeded by: Juan Miguel de Esparza

Personal details
- Born: c.1725 Gipuzkoa, San Sebastián, Spain
- Died: 1790s Buenos Aires, Argentina
- Spouse: María Teresa de Eguía
- Occupation: Politician
- Profession: attorney military

Military service
- Allegiance: Spanish Empire
- Branch/service: Spanish Army
- Rank: Captain

Joseph Blás de Gainza (c.1725-1790s) was a Spanish merchant, military man and politician, who served as mayor of Buenos Aires.

== Biography ==
Gainza was born in Gipuzkoa, Spain, the son of Pedro de Gainza and Teresa de Leyza. He was married to María Teresa de Eguía y San Martín, daughter of Juan de Eguía, born in Navarra, and Jerónima Isabel de San Martín, belonging to an illustrious family of Buenos Aires.

Joseph Blás de Gainza was consul of the Commerce Consulate of Buenos Aires, and served as alcalde of first vote of the city on two occasions. His first term was in 1763, and the second in 1779 during the Viceroyalty of the Río de la Plata. He was also acting mayor in substitution of Manuel Antonio Warnes.
