= Antón García Caro =

Escribano Antón García Caro

Notario Mayor de Gobierno of Buenos Aires
- In office 1588–1600
- Monarch: Philip III
- Preceded by: Pedro de Espinosa
- Succeeded by: Francisco Pérez de Burgos

Procurador General of Buenos Aires
- In office ?–?
- Monarch: Philip III
- Preceded by: Juan Fernández de Enciso
- Succeeded by: ?

Personal details
- Born: 1560 Carmona, Spain
- Died: 1624 (aged 63–64) Cochabamba, Viceroyalty of Peru
- Spouse: Juana Gómez de Sanabria y Sotomayor
- Occupation: Government
- Profession: legal

Military service
- Allegiance: Spanish Empire

Antón García Caro (1560-c.1624) was a Spanish jurist and politician, who performed legal functions during the Viceroyalty of Peru, serving as escribano and procurador of Buenos Aires.

== Biography ==
He was born in Carmona, Seville, Spain, son of a Spanish family of Basque ancestors. He was married to María Gómez de Sanabria, daughter of Captain Juan Gómes de Sanabria and María de Sotomayor y Ruiz de Orellana, a noble woman possibly linked to the House of Méndez de Sotomayor.

Antón García Caro arrived at the Río de la Plata from Cádiz in the expedition Alonso de Vera y Aragón. He belonged to the second contingent of settlers that was established in the city of Buenos Aires after the second foundation. In 1588, Juan Torre de Vera y Aragón granted him lands located in the vicinity of Luján river.
