= Miguel Gerónimo de Esparza =

Spanish nobleman, attorney and Regidor (1678–1767)

Captain Miguel Gerónimo de Esparza

Perpetual Regidor of Buenos Aires
- In office 1718–1766
- Preceded by: Juan Fernández Guillen
- Succeeded by: Gregorio Ramos Mexía

Interim Mayor of Buenos Aires In office (1722) (1746) (1755) (1760)

Personal details
- Born: Miguel Gerónimo de Esparza y Rodríguez; 1678 Buenos Aires, Viceroyalty of Peru
- Died: 1767 (aged 88–89) Buenos Aires, Viceroyalty of Peru
- Resting place: Santo Domingo Convent
- Spouse: Antonia Cabral de Melo y Morales
- Occupation: government politician laws trade hacienda
- Profession: Army officer jurist
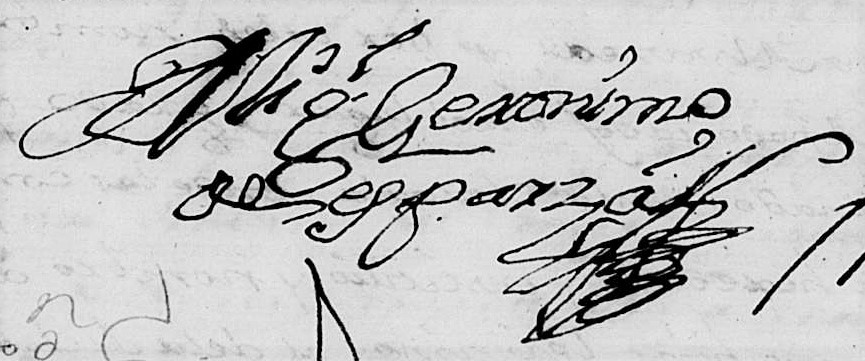
- Signature

Military service
- Allegiance: Spanish Empire
- Branch/service: Spanish Army
- Years of service: 1700-1750
- Rank: Captain
- Unit: Fuerte de Buenos Aires
- Commands: Milicias Provinciales de Buenos Aires

Miguel Gerónimo de Esparza (1678–1767) was a Spanish nobleman, who served during the Viceroyalty of Peru as Attorney and Regidor of Buenos Aires. He also served as Captain of the Militias and acting Mayor of Buenos Aires for several periods.

== Career History ==
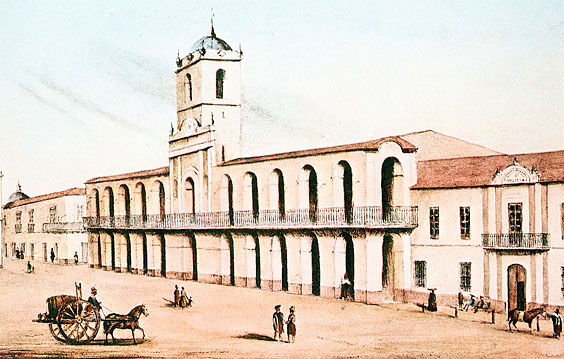
Buenos Aires Cabildo by Alberico Isola

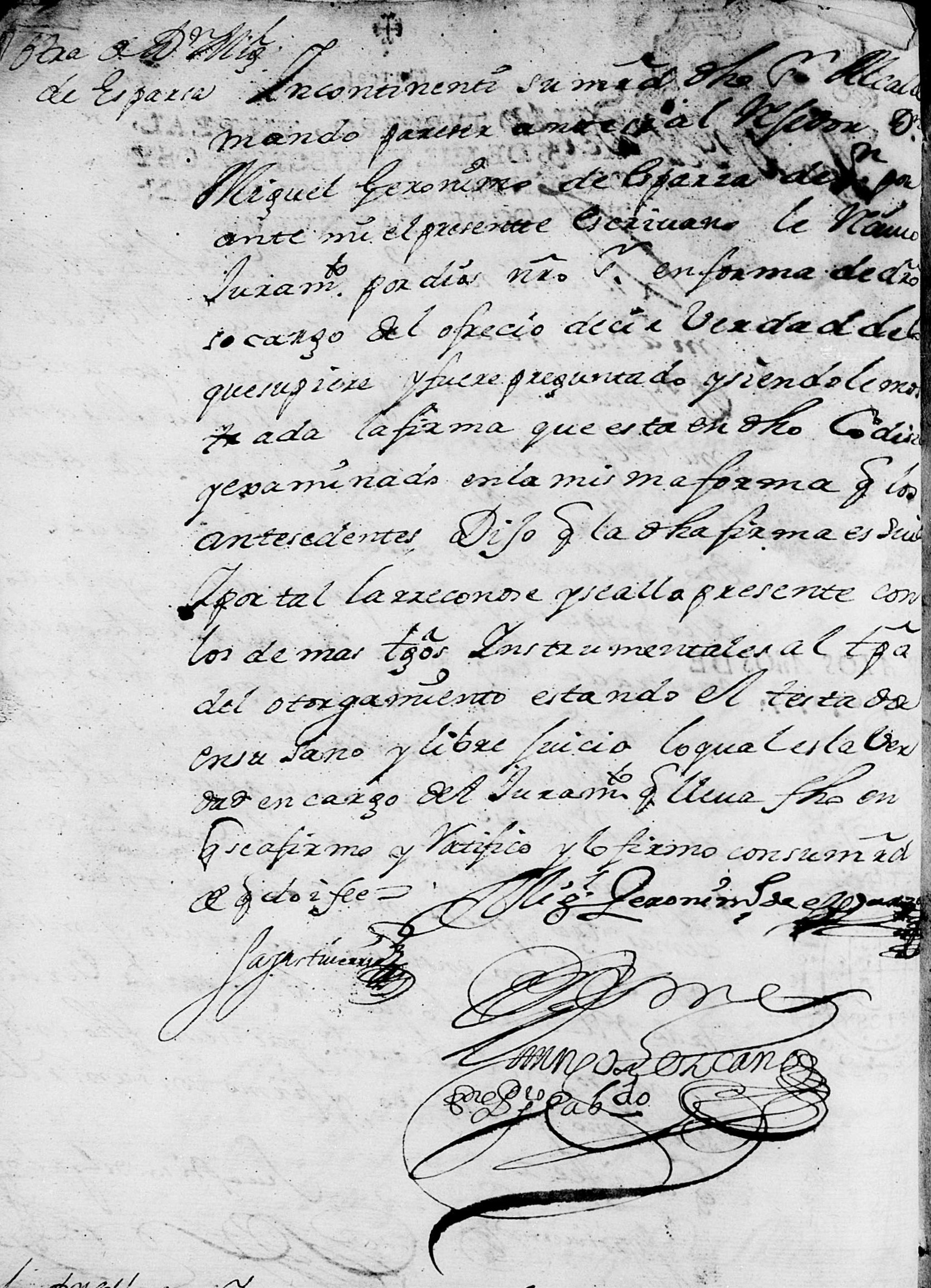
record of oath of Miguel Gerónimo de Esparza as Mayor of Buenos Aires in 1722.

Miguel Gerónimo de Esparza y Rodríguez was born in Buenos Aires, the son of Alejo de Esparza, distinguished Captain and merchant originally from Lumbier, Navarre, and Escolástica Rodríguez, a Creole belonging to a family of the first settlers.

He probably did his elementary studies in Buenos Aires, and the tertiary at the University of Saint Francis Xavier, where he graduated in law. He began his political and military career during the end of the period of the Habsburg. He was present in the Cabildo of Buenos Aires when Buenos Aires was granted the title of Very Noble, and very loyal City, granted by His Majesty King Philip V of Spain.

Esparza bought the title of perpetual regidor of the city of Buenos Aires in 1718, and made his oath before the notary Don Francisco de Merlo, on March 18 of the same year. He participated in the negotiations between the City Council and John Truppe (president South Sea Company), on the sale of 25 thousand bull leathers to the Asiento de Inglaterra. He served as Regidor Perpetuo (dean councilor) of Buenos Aires until 1766, during the viceroyalty of Manuel de Amat y Junyent.

As a member of the city council, Miguel Gerónimo de Esparza, dealt with matters concerning the problems caused by the bullfights held in the Plaza Mayor, prior to the creation of Plaza de Toros de Montserrat and Plaza de Toros del Retiro. He also took part in the debates due to the problems arising from the Portuguese settlements in the Banda Oriental the issue of the Guerra del Asiento, between Spain and England, the cobblestone work of the Riachuelo riverbank, the question of the incursions of the Pampas tribes, and matters related to the death of Ferdinand VI, and the assumption of his successor Charles III.

He also took part in the request for the foundation of a Bethlehemite Brothers hospital in Buenos Aires. In 1752, he and the other deputies informed his Majesty about the deterioration of the Cathedral of the City, and take part in the contracting of the architect Antonio Masella, who started the reconstruction works of the Cathedral in 1753.

He had a long career in legal matters in the Río de la Plata. In 1719, he served as a defensor de pobres (defender of minors), and like lawyer or adviser of Buenos Aires. He also was appointed to the position of conjuez de menores (judge of minors) in 1745.

In 1731, Esparza was designated as Fiel Ejecutor, a charge that consisted in the inspection and control of commercial activity in the Río de la Plata. In 1746, he served temporarily as alcalde ordinario of the city of Buenos Aires in substitution of Gaspar de Bustamante, alcalde of second vote. He returned to occupy the post of mayor of second vote in 1760, this time in substitution of Don Joseph de Iturriaga.

In 1744, he was appointed by the governor Domingo Ortiz de Rosas, to take charge of the completion of the padron (census) of the city of Buenos Aires.

Miguel Gerónimo de Esparza was also in charge of providing services in ceremonies and public events in Buenos Aires. For several periods it was designated as Alférez Real, in charge to attend the patronal party in honor of San Martín de Tours, patron of the City and the archdiocese of Buenos Aires. In 1725, he took part in the senses tributes that were made in the city to the Monarch Louis I of Spain, died on August 18, 1724.

In 1733 he participated in the festivities of the city on the occasion of the Conquest of Oran by the Spanish Empire.

Like many politicians of the time Esparza, was also dedicated to the military career. He took part in various military campaigns against the incursions of the Pampas, including his actions against the tribes of the Calelián chief in the northern territories of the Province of Buenos Aires. He also served as contador del Ramo de Guerra (Council of War) and as a commander in the Fuerte de Buenos Aires, the main fortification of the city.

He was also dedicated to commerce, he belonged to the select group of neighbors of Basque and Creole origin, who had ties to Cádiz. Among these neighbors was Juan de la Palma y Lobatón, Domingo de Basavilbaso, his colleagues in the Ayuntamiento, and Alonso García de Zúñiga, belonging to one of the most powerful families of Río de la Plata.

Miguel Gerónimo de Esparza was one of the most veteran politicians and military of the colonial period of Buenos Aires. In 1764 he took oath to his son Juan Miguel de Esparza, who had been elected alcalde of first voto. And two years later (1766) at the age of 87, he was sworn to the alcalde Miguel de la Rocha Rodríguez. That same year, he resigned from the position of Regidor décano of the city of Buenos Aires in favor of Gregorio Ramos Mexía.

== Family ==
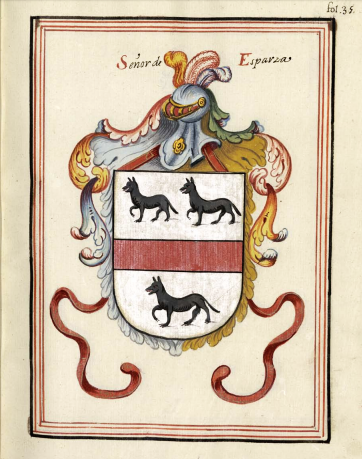
Coat of arms belonging to the Lords of Esparza

He was married on July 2, 1706 in the Buenos Aires Cathedral to Antonia Cabral de Melo, daughter of Antonio Cabral de Melo y Carbajal and Leonor de Morales y Manzanares, belonging to noble families of Portuguese and Spanish roots. Esparza's wife was related to the family of Amador Vaz de Alpoim and Pedro Morales y Mercado.

He and his wife were parents of several children including Juan Miguel de Esparza, a distinguished government official of the city, who served as regidor and alcalde.

His brother Joseph de Esparza, was a politician who had an active participation as a colonial official. He was married to María Verdún, a noble woman, relative of Bernardino Verdún de Villayzán. His sisters María de Esparza and Ines de Esparza, were related to distinguished military of Basque origin. María was married to Gabriel Ximénez, born in Biscay, and Inés with Juan de Zenarro, native of Pasaia, Gipuzkoa.

In 1717, Miguel Gerónimo de Esparza attended as a witness in the marriage of his cousin, María Josefa Zenarro Esparza with Pedro Gribeo, (descendant of Domingo Gribeo) who served as Lieutenant governor of Corrientes in 1728.

Miguel Gerónimo de Esparza died on September 10, 1767, receiving the funeral honors on the part of its comrades of the Cabildo, including Vicente de Azcuénaga and Manuel de Basavilbaso, alcaldes of first and second voto. His wife, Doña Antonia Cabral de Melo, died in 1769.

Juan Miguel de Esparza and Antonia Cabral de Melo were owners of a luxurious house, built of bricks and tile roof, with a kitchen, a bedroom, a loft with two bedrooms, a water well, an orchard, fruit trees. It was located on the streets San Martín and Piedad, current Calle Reconquista and Bartolomé Mitre, barrio de San Nicolás, and inherited by his daughters Sebastiana and Leonor de Esparza, who requested in their will that a Chaplaincy be founded on the same site of the house.
