= Martín de Telleria =

Martín de Tellería

Governor of the Margarita Island
- In office 1669–1671
- Monarch: Charles II

Personal details
- Born: c.1610 Guipúzcoa, Spain
- Died: c.1690 Buenos Aires, Argentina
- Occupation: Politician
- Profession: Navigator

Military service
- Allegiance: Spain
- Branch/service: Spanish Navy
- Rank: Captain

Martín de Telleria (17th century) was a Basque nobleman in the service of the Spanish Crown. He served as navigator, Captain, and as Governor of the Margarita Island, during the Spanish colonization of the Americas.

== Biography ==
Telleria was born in Guipúzcoa, (Spain), son of Santiago de Telleria. He was appointed on February 19, 1669, as Governor of Isla de Margarita, some sources said who the name Castillo San Carlos de Borromeo was given by the governor of Margarita, Martin de Telleria, in honor of King Carlos II. Telleria remained in office until December 1671.

Martín Telleria had also served for the Viceroyalty of Peru, in July 1659 he had departed from the port of San Sebastián, bound for Buenos Aires. The crew had arrived at the port of the city in 1660, aboard the Ship "Nuestra Señora de Aranzazu". Telleria had been authorized by the King of Spain, to lead arms, ammunition and two companies of infantry to reinforce the Fuerte de Buenos Aires.
