= Víctor Casco de Mendoza =

General Víctor Casco de Mendoza

Lieutenant Governor of Buenos Aires
- In office 1606–1607
- Preceded by: Tomás de Garay
- Succeeded by: Simón de Valdez

Mayor of Buenos Aires
- In office 1603–1604
- Preceded by: Juan Ramírez de Abreu
- Succeeded by: Francisco Muñoz

Mayor of Buenos Aires
- In office 1610–1611
- Preceded by: Pedro de Izarra
- Succeeded by: Francisco de Salas Reynoso

Mayor of Buenos Aires
- In office 1615–1616
- Preceded by: Juan de Vergara
- Succeeded by: Pedro de Izarra

Personal details
- Born: Asunción, Paraguay
- Died: Buenos Aires, Argentina
- Spouse: Luisa de Valderrama
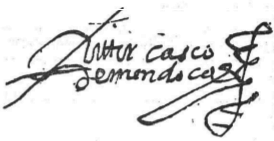
- Signature

Military service
- Allegiance: Spain
- Branch/service: Spanish Army
- Rank: General

Víctor Casco de Mendoza was a Spanish nobleman in the 16th century. He held political posts during the Viceroyalty of Peru, serving as alcalde, regidor and lieutenant governor of Buenos Aires and Asunción.

== Biography ==
He was born in Asunción, the son of Gonzalo Casco, a Spanish conquistador, born in Asturias, and María de Mendoza Irala, belonging to a noble family of Asunción. He was married to Luisa de Valderrama, daughter of Juan de Fustes and Beatriz Ramírez.

Víctor Casco de Mendoza was one of the sixty-three neighbors who accompanied Juan de Garay in the second foundation of Buenos Aires.
