= Bernardo de Saavedra =

Capitán Bernardo de Saavedra

Vice-Mayor of Buenos Aires
- In office 1721–1722
- Monarch: Philip V of Spain
- Preceded by: Juan Vicente Vetolaza
- Succeeded by: Juan Bautista Sagastiverria

Procurador General of Buenos Aires
- In office ?–?
- Preceded by: ?
- Succeeded by: ?

Personal details
- Born: Bernardo de Saavedra y Gutiérrez de Paz; 1681 Buenos Aires, Viceroyalty of Peru
- Died: August 27, 1722 (aged 40–41) Buenos Aires, Viceroyalty of Peru
- Spouse: Ana de la Palma y Lobatón

Military service
- Allegiance: Spain
- Branch/service: Spanish Army
- Years of service: 1700-1722
- Rank: Captain
- Unit: Fuerte de Buenos Aires
- Commands: Milicias Provinciales of Buenos Aires

Bernardo de Saavedra (1681-1722) was a Spanish politician and soldier, who served as alcalde, procurador and regidor of Buenos Aires.

== Biography ==
Saavedra was born in Buenos Aires, the son of Pedro de Saavedra and Clara Gutiérrez de Paz, belonging to a distinguished family of Spanish Creole roots. He was married to Ana de la Palma y Lobatón, daughter of Francisco de la Palma Lobatón, born in Granada, and Antonia del Pozo Silva, born in the city.

He was elected alcalde of 2nd vote in 1721, and served for several periods as regidor of the Cabildo of Buenos Aires. He also served as Acting Attorney General of the city of Buenos Aires. Among his descendants are Cornelio de Saavedra, president of the Primera Junta, and Cornelio Saavedra Rodríguez, a Chilean politician and military born in Santiago.
