= Francisco Álvarez Campana =

Spanish merchant and politician

Don Francisco Álvarez-Campana

Procurador General of Buenos Aires
- In office 1764–1765
- Monarch: Charles III of Spain
- Preceded by: Baltasar de Arandia
- Succeeded by: Santiago de Castilla

Regidor of the Buenos Aires Cabildo
- In office 1764–1765

Personal details
- Born: Francisco Antonio Álvarez-Campana y Vega; 1707 Cádiz, Spain
- Died: 30 December 1773 (aged 65–66) Buenos Aires, Argentina
- Resting place: Convento de San Francisco
- Spouse: Isabel Gil Rodríguez
- Children: Timoteo Álvarez-Campana; José Miguel Álvarez-Campana; Ana Eusebia Álvarez-Campana
- Relatives: Mariano Marcos Esparza Sánchez (godson)
- Occupation: politician merchant charity
- Profession: attorney
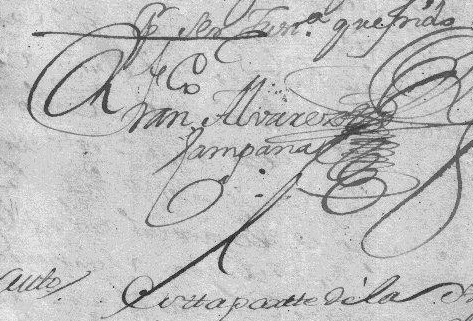
- Signature

Francisco Antonio Álvarez-Campana y Vega (1707–1773) was a Spanish merchant and politician, who served during the Viceroyalty of Peru as Regidor and Attorney General of Buenos Aires. He was the founder of the Colegio de Huérfanas de Buenos Aires, an educational institute dedicated to the teaching of orphan girls.

The city of Campana in the Province of Buenos Aires was founded in 1885 in honor of Francisco Álvarez-Campana, owner of those lands towards the middle of the 18th century.

== Biography ==
He was born in Cádiz, Spain, the son of Bernardo Álvarez-Campana y Montes de Oca and Josefa Manuela Vega Olivera, belonging to illustrious Andalusian families from El Puerto de Santa María and the Isla de León. He studied in his native country and settled in Buenos Aires around the beginning of 1750, holding various positions related to charitable entities, including as Hermano Mayor of the Hermandad de la Santa Caridad of Buenos Aires in 1754. That same year he requested to the Council of the Cabildo authorization for the construction of the Casa de Niñas Huérfanas (School of Orphans). The authorization for the foundation of the home of charity came through the royal cedula of 16 October 1754. He also requested the council to notify the King of the need to build a care home for homeless and an hospital of the Charity in the College The house of orphans had a room with thirteen beds for women, attended by the slaves and orphans of the college.

For the year of 1754, Francisco Álvarez-Campana asked the City Council to suspend the bullfights that were to take place during the celebration of the Jubilee. In 1760 Campana is appointed to occupy the position of Regidor and later as Procurador General of Buenos Aires. He also dedicated himself to commerce, and by 1765 he installed a tannery on the banks of Riachuelo. His factory caused serious ecological damages in the area. He was owner of the hacienda known by the name of "Rincón de Campana", where he dedicated himself to the breeding of cattle.

In 1766, Campana was arrested by royal order for having acquired property on behalf of another person. The government of Buenos Aires had confiscated all his properties located in the jurisdiction of the Viceroyalty of Peru. He regained his liberty in 1771, requesting permission of the authorities, to return to take charge of the direction of the Escuela Huérfanas.

He was married on 17 October 1762, in Buenos Aires to Isabel Gil Rodríguez, daughter of Nicolás Gil and Bartola Rodríguez Osorio. His brother, José Álvarez-Campana, a knight belonging to the order Order of Santiago, served as alcalde ordinario of Veracruz in 1737.

On 18 April 1875, the brothers Eduardo and Luis Costa founded the town of Campana (Buenos Aires Province) in honor of Francisco Álvarez-Campana, who was the first owner of these lands in 1757.
