= Bartolomé González de Villaverde =

Personal details
- Born: 1512 León, Spain
- Died: 1589 (aged 76–77) Asunción, Paraguay
- Spouse: María de Santa Cruz
- Occupation: politician
- Profession: notary

Military service
- Allegiance: Spain
- Branch/service: Spanish Army
- Years of service: c.1530-1589
- Rank: Conquistador

Bartolomé González de Villaverde (1512–1589) was a Spanish notary and conquistador.

Born in 1512 in León, Spain, he had arrived to Buenos Aires in the expedition of Pedro de Mendoza. He was one of the first settlers of Asunción, where was married to María de Santa Cruz, a natural daughter of Spanish conqueror Juan de Santa Cruz.

He and his wife had 12 children, two of whom were the alderman and mayor Bartolomé González de Villaverde, and Roque González de Santa Cruz, who was proclaimed saint by Pope John Paul II.
