= Pere Arnaut de Garro =

Basque nobleman

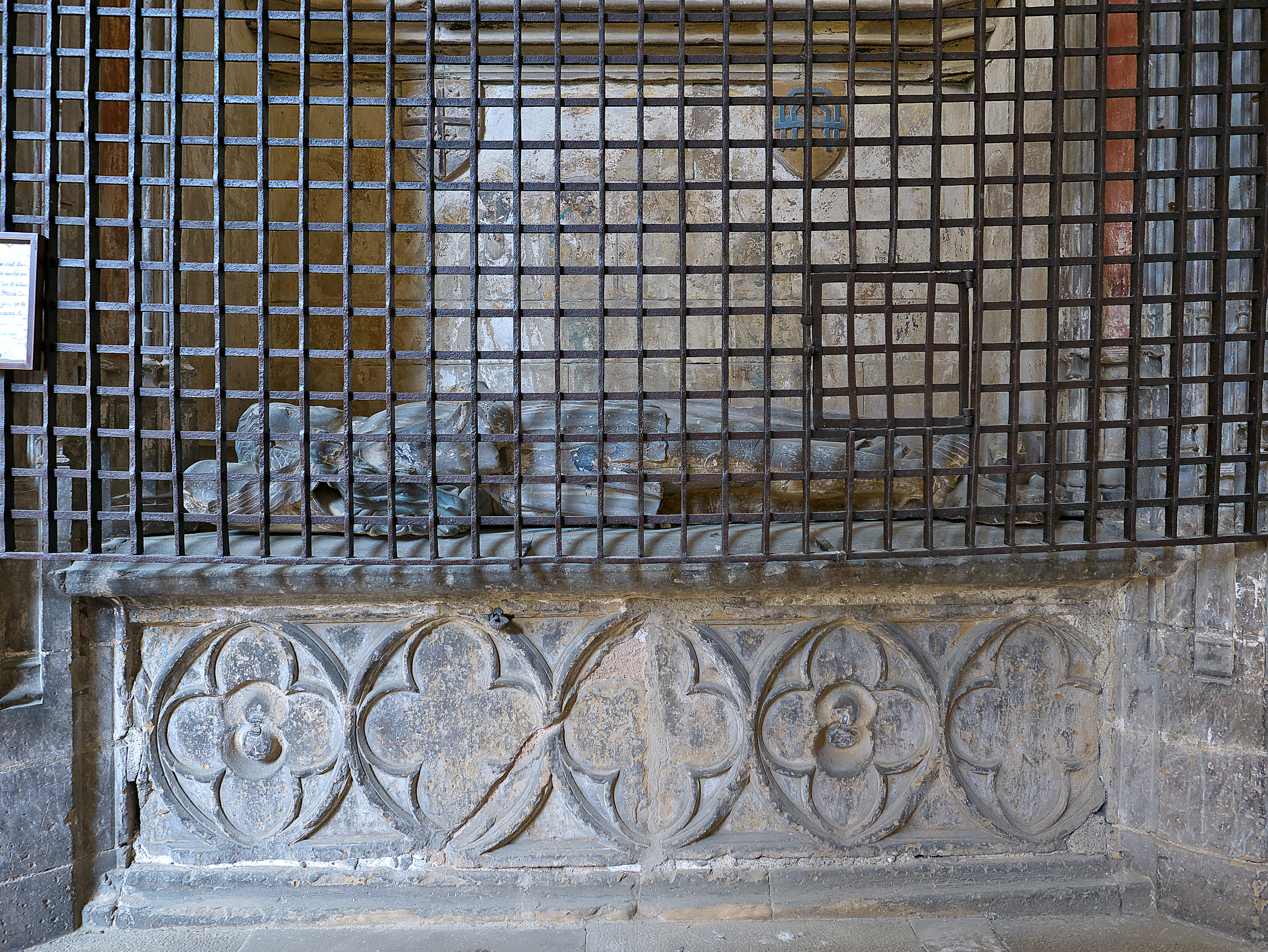
- Grave of Pere Arnaut de Garro and Juana de Beunza
- Born: c.1360 Aquitaine
- Died: 1422; Navarra, Kingdom of Navarre
- Buried: Pamplona Cathedral
- Noble family: Garro's
- Spouse: Juana de Beunza
- Occupation: Ambassador

Pere Arnaut de Garro (?–1422) was a Basque nobleman, he held political posts in the Kingdom of Navarre, being ambassador of Charles II in Aragon, Avignon and England.

== Biography ==
He probably born in Château de Garro located in the Pyrénées-Atlantiques (Aquitaine). In 1386, Garro had earned income of Cinco Villas (Navarra). Being ambassador Pere Arnaut de Garro travel to London to finalize the details of the wedding the daughter of Charles II, with a prince of the Court of England. In gratification by the merits of his ancestors during the Hundred Years' War, Edward III of England awarded him an annual income of 200 pounds of gold.

Garro was the Governor and Alcalde of the town and castle of Saint-Jean-Pied-de-Port, the capital of the sixth Merindad Lower Navarre.
