= Arnao Esterlin =

Flemish conquistador

Personal details
- Born: c. 1510 Flanders
- Died: 1593 Asunción, Paraguay
- Occupation: politician
- Profession: artilleryman

Military service
- Allegiance: Spanish Empire
- Branch/service: Spanish Army
- Years of service: 1530s-1593
- Rank: Conquistador

Arnao Esterlin (c. 1510 – 1593) was a Flemish conquistador in service of the Spanish crown. He took part in the appointment of Captain Domingo Martínez de Irala as lieutenant governor of Asunción.

Esterlin was born in Flanders, the son of Cristóbal Esterlin (Osterling) and Ana Bersthin, natives of Germany. He arrived at Río de la Plata as a gunner in the expedition of Pedro de Mendoza.

Arnao Esterlin had three natural children with a Guaraní woman, native of Asunción. His son Rodrigo de Esterlín, was married to Juana Solorzano, the daughter of Zoilo de Solorzano, a conqueror born in Biscay.
