= Pedro Morales y Mercado =

Spanish nobleman

Captain Pedro Morales y Mercado

Lieutenant Governor of Buenos Aires
- In office 1661–1662
- Monarch: Philip IV
- Preceded by: Amador de Roxas y Azevedo
- Succeeded by: Jacinto Vela de Hinojosa

Vice-Mayor of Buenos Aires
- In office 1651–1652
- Monarch: Philip IV
- Preceded by: Juan Nieto de Umanes
- Succeeded by: Lorenzo Suárez Maldonado

Personal details
- Born: c. 1610 Ciudad de Rodrigo, Salamanca, Spain
- Died: c. 1670 Buenos Aires, Argentina
- Spouse: María de Manzanares y Aguilar
- Occupation: politician army
- Profession: treasurer military man
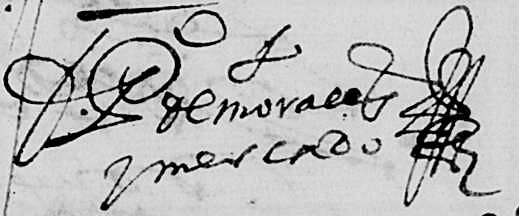
- Signature

Military service
- Allegiance: Spanish Empire
- Branch/service: Spanish Army
- Years of service: c. 1620-c. 1660
- Rank: Captain

Pedro Morales y Mercado (c. 1610 - c. 1670) was a 17th-century Spanish nobleman, who held different honorific positions in the Río de la Plata, serving as mayor, army officer and treasurer of Buenos Aires.

== Biography ==
Pedro Morales y Mercado was born about 1610 in Ciudad de Rodrigo, (Spain), son of Juan de Morales y Mercado and Blanca Enríquez de Soria, belonging to a noble family, possibly related to the House of Enríquez.

Towards the year 1630 he moved to Buenos Aires, where served as Captain in the Fuerte de Buenos Aires. On January 1, 1651 Antonio de la Torre Herrera and Pedro Morales y Mercado, swore before the Governor Jacinto de Láriz, as mayors of first and second vote of the City of Buenos Aires. That same year, Morales was named Alférez Real, being in charge of carrying the Royal Standard in the St. Martin's Day.

Pedro Morales y Mercado served for more than thirty years to the Spanish Empire. In 1660 he was appointed to the position of Lieutenant Governor and Lieutenant general of the Río de la Plata, the highest hierarchical post after the Governor.

He also had held various senior positions during the Viceroyalty of Peru, serving as Captain, Chief Justice and Treasurer of Buenos Aires. His wife was María Manzanares y Aguilar, daughter of Francisco de Manzanares y Dardos, a Spanish politician, born in Toledo, and Leonor de Aguilar Pérez de Burgos, born in Buenos Aires. Pedro de Morales y Mercado maintained ties with the families of Ignacio Fernández de Agüero and Juan Báez de Alpoim, who attended as witnesses at the wedding of one of their daughters.
