= Leonardo Gribeo =

Italian conquistador

Conquistador at the service of the Spanish Empire
- Monarch: Charles V

Personal details
- Died: Asunción, Viceroyalty of Peru
- Spouse: Isabel Martin
- Occupation: Politician; Conquistador
- Profession: Army's officer

Military service
- Allegiance: Spanish Empire
- Branch/service: Spanish Navy
- Rank: Conquistador

Leonardo Gribeo was an Italian conquistador in the service of the Spanish Crown. In 1536, he was part of the expedition of Pedro de Mendoza in the Río de la Plata, actively participating in the conquest of Buenos Aires and Asunción.

== Biography ==
According to some authors Gribeo was born in Cagliari, Sardinia. In 1535 he arrived at the Río de la Plata in the expedition led by Pedro de Mendoza, participating in the first foundation of the city of Buenos Aires.

Leonardo Gribeo had an intense political activity as conqueror of Asunción, a city where he held various public offices, including regidor, procurator and ombudsman. His wife was Isabel Martin, daughter of conquistador Manuel Martin.
