= Francisco de Manzanares y Dardos =

Spanish nobleman and politician

Captain Francisco de Manzanares y Dardos

Vice-Mayor of Buenos Aires
- In office 1613–1614
- Monarch: Philip III
- Preceded by: Mateo Leal de Ayala
- Succeeded by: Sebastian de Orduña

Procurador General of Buenos Aires
- In office 1615–1616
- Preceded by: ?
- Succeeded by: ?

Personal details
- Born: c. 1580 La Mancha, Toledo, Spain
- Died: 13 January 1642 Buenos Aires, Argentina
- Spouse: Leonor Pérez Burgos de Aguilar
- Children: Desciende a traves de su hija Doña Juana de Manzanares es el Imo Señor Don Nestor Pereyra.Caballero del Rio de la Plata N 1966 con descendencia.Actualmente residente en Montevideo Uruguay.
- Occupation: politician military man
- Profession: army laws
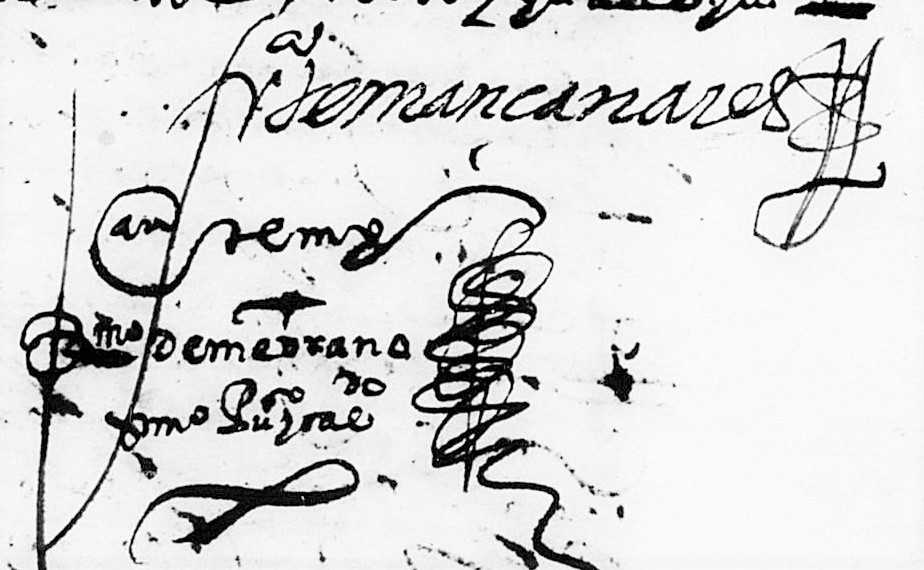
- Signature

Military service
- Allegiance: Spanish Empire
- Branch/service: Spanish Army
- Years of service: c. 1600-c.1640
- Rank: Captain

Francisco de Manzanares y Dardos (born-16th-century) was a Spanish nobleman and politician, who served during the Viceroyalty of Peru, holding honorary functions as alcalde, alguacil, lieutenant governor and regidor of Buenos Aires.

== Biography ==
He was born in Villa de la Membrilla, La Mancha, the son of Pedro Alonso Dardos and María López de Manzanares, belonging to illustrious Spanish families. He was married in Buenos Aires to Leonor de Aguilar Pérez de Burgos, daughter of Francisco Pérez de Burgos and Juana de Aguilar y Salvatierra, a Creole lady, daughter of Andrés Gil and Leonor de Zamora, natives of Ronda (Spain).

He was elected vice-mayor of Buenos Aires in 1613, and served for several periods as regidor of the Cabildo of Buenos Aires. He participated in the funeral honors performed to Diego Marín de Negrón, governor of Buenos Aires, who died in the city in 1613, and also took part in the swearing of Francés de Beaumont y Navarra, as the new governor.

Francisco de Manzanares y Dardos held various government positions, including alguacil mayor, procurator general, fiel ejecutor and mayordomo of Buenos Aires. He also served as interim lieutenant governor of Buenos Aires in 1600.
