= Carlos Esparza =

- Born: September 1828, Died September 28, 1885; Matamoros, Tamaulipas, Mexico
- Military career
- Allegiance: Mexico
- Branch: Army
- Conflicts: Mexican-American War

Carlos Esparza (1828 – September 28, 1885) lived in Mexico at the Texas border, and during his life he served as a soldier and the leader of the spy ring of Juan Cortina. In addition, he wrote poetry and proverbs.

== Basic biography ==
Carlos Esparza was born in September 1828 of Pedro Esparza and Felicidad Villereal in Matamoros, Tamaulipas, Mexico, a town that was often involved in violence between the United States and Mexico during the Texas Revolution and the Mexican–American War. Carlos Esparza was one of eight children, and was tutored at home, primarily by the family priest. Carlos Esparza was wed to Francisca Garcia on January 30, 1850. Francesca became his aid in his job as a “strategist and spy” for Juan Cortina. After a life of activity as a member of Juan Cortina's guerrilla forces, and later as a local political leader, he died on September 28, 1885.

== Military career ==
Carlos Esparza was a longtime friend and collaborator of Juan Cortina. With him, Esparza fought in the Mexican–American War. During the Mexican–American War, Fort Texas stood just across the Rio Grande from Matamoros. After months of preparations by both armies, during which the relations between the two sides were almost friendly, a siege was attempted by the Mexican Army in Matamoros on the American fort across the river. However, the siege was broken by American troops and the resulting battles of Palo Alto and Resaca de las Palmas, which Carlos Esparza fought in. Both battles were Mexican losses, and the Texas side of the Rio Grande was not reconquered.

Carlos Esparza retired from the Mexican Army in 1848. However, when the revolutionary Jose Maria Jesus Carabajal sought to found his own country in Esparza's region of Mexico, with American troops, Esparza took up arms alongside Juan Cortina to defend the area. The forces met in Matamoras, Mexico in twelve days of guerilla warfare. Eventually Carabajal was forced across the border into Texas.

Carlos Esparza also led forces to defend the region from Native American raids during the 1850s. (Carlos, 19). Native Americans remained a threat to settlers in the area through the 1870s.

Esparza patronized Cortina by supplying arms, money and food to his army from 1860 to 1876, even after Esparza himself retired from fighting, and despite the fact that he and Cortina did not always agree on how to achieve their goals. Also, Esparza participated in Cortina's spying system. In 1859, Cortina made Esparza the head of his spy ring, despite the wishes of Esparza himself, who preferred the less active efforts of giving money and food to the cause. Esparza used the fashion of long hoop skirts for women to the advantage of the network, using female messengers to carry documents in their layers of hoops and petticoats.

Cortina's armed efforts to gain political sway in southern Texas did not stop during the American Civil War (1861–1865). In fact, the war was seen as an opportunity to take advantage of vulnerability. Esparza used the opportunity of the war for economic gain, selling foodstuffs across the border at high profits, possibly earning as high as $200 a day.

== Political career ==
In 1873 Esparza was appointed special deputy inspector of hides and animals in Cameron County. His political power was originally given by Cortina to give Esparza access to the city's resources. Esparza used his semi-official status as a government member to further his social projects.

Esparza believed in social reform and worked particularly to improve public health. On his farm all water was boiled and stored in clay jars so that the clay would absorb impurities. Esparza recommended swamps be drained to prevent mosquito breeding in an effort to circumvent malaria. At the time, the exact cause of the disease was unsure, but Esparza did prove correct. Esparza grew gardens of herbs for medical use to supply local hospitals.

Carlos Esparza pushed for the removal of the children in his community from dangerous jobs, such as stocking the furnaces of steamboats, where many children were known to have suffocated or burned to death. He was successful in part due to the fact that if employers refused to reform, Esparza had Cortina's soldiers at his back to use as enforcers for his reform policies. Esparza also paid for an orphanage to be built under the care of the Oblate Fathers.

Esparza wished to abolish prostitution, blaming it for the widespread venereal disease in the region. However, that was not possible, since “Cortina depended on prostitution for tax revenues and for his capable spying system”.

Cortina fell from power when he was captured by the troops of the new Mexican dictator José Diaz in 1876. At that time, Esparza became a local sheriff and began the work of keeping proper public records, which up until that time had been neglected. He fired corrupt officials and paid for the construction of a new courthouse.

== Later years and death ==
Near the end of his life, dissolusioned with the world and in danger of being punished for his political and military activities under Cortina, Esparza became reclusive. He designed his farm so that it could be largely self-sufficient, able to supply the essentials of life by growing both food crops and cotton for clothing. After 1873, Esparza became partly paralytic, “without full control of his arms”, due to an old war wound. Esparza died of a liver disease on September 28, 1885.

== Literary works and philosophy ==
While Esparza did cooperate with local religious in matters of social reform, Esparza's personal philosophy was against organized religion. With the group who frequented his salons, Esparza believed in individualism that grew into social reform, focusing on the individual instead of Mexico's established Roman Catholicism. Esparza hosted salons at his home to encourage intellectual and cultural growth. Esparza wrote poetry, often about his own life experiences as a soldier. His poems reveal an aversion to violence that he felt even during his military and political career.

In addition, Carlos Esparza was known for a writing number of proverbs. They include: “If we were as industrious as the devil, we would be far ahead”, “What is good literature today may be rubbish tomorrow”, and “Men and hurricanes are hard to predict,”.
