= Diego Gutiérrez de Humanes =

Teniente de Gobernador of Santa Fe Province
- In office 1648–1649
- Monarch: Philip IV of Spain
- Preceded by: Pedro Home de Pessoa
- Succeeded by: ?

Personal details
- Born: 1607 Buenos Aires, Argentina
- Died: c.1660 Buenos Aires, Argentina
- Occupation: Politician
- Profession: militia

Military service
- Allegiance: Spanish Empire
- Branch/service: Spanish Army
- Rank: Captain

Diego Gutiérrez de Humanes (1607 - 1660s) was a Spanish politician and military man who served in the Viceroyalty of Peru as Lieutenant Governor of Santa Fe, Argentina.

== Biography ==
Diego Gutiérrez de Humanes was born 1607 in Buenos Aires. As the son of Pedro Gutiérrez and Mayor Humanés de Molina, he belonged to a distinguished Spanish family. He was married to Leonor Carbajal, daughter of Gonzalo Carbajal and María de Salas y Reynoso. In 1633 Diego Gutiérrez de Humanes, was elected Alcalde de la santa hermandad, in the town of Monte Grande. His brother Juan Gutierrez de Humanes, served as Alcalde of second vote in Buenos Aires in 1648.

Diego Gutiérrez de Humanes, and his brother had received land grants in Parana, Santa Lucía and in the present territories of San Pedro and Arrecifes.
