= Sarriés – Sartze =

Municipality of Spain

Coordinates: 42.8361°N 1.09889°W

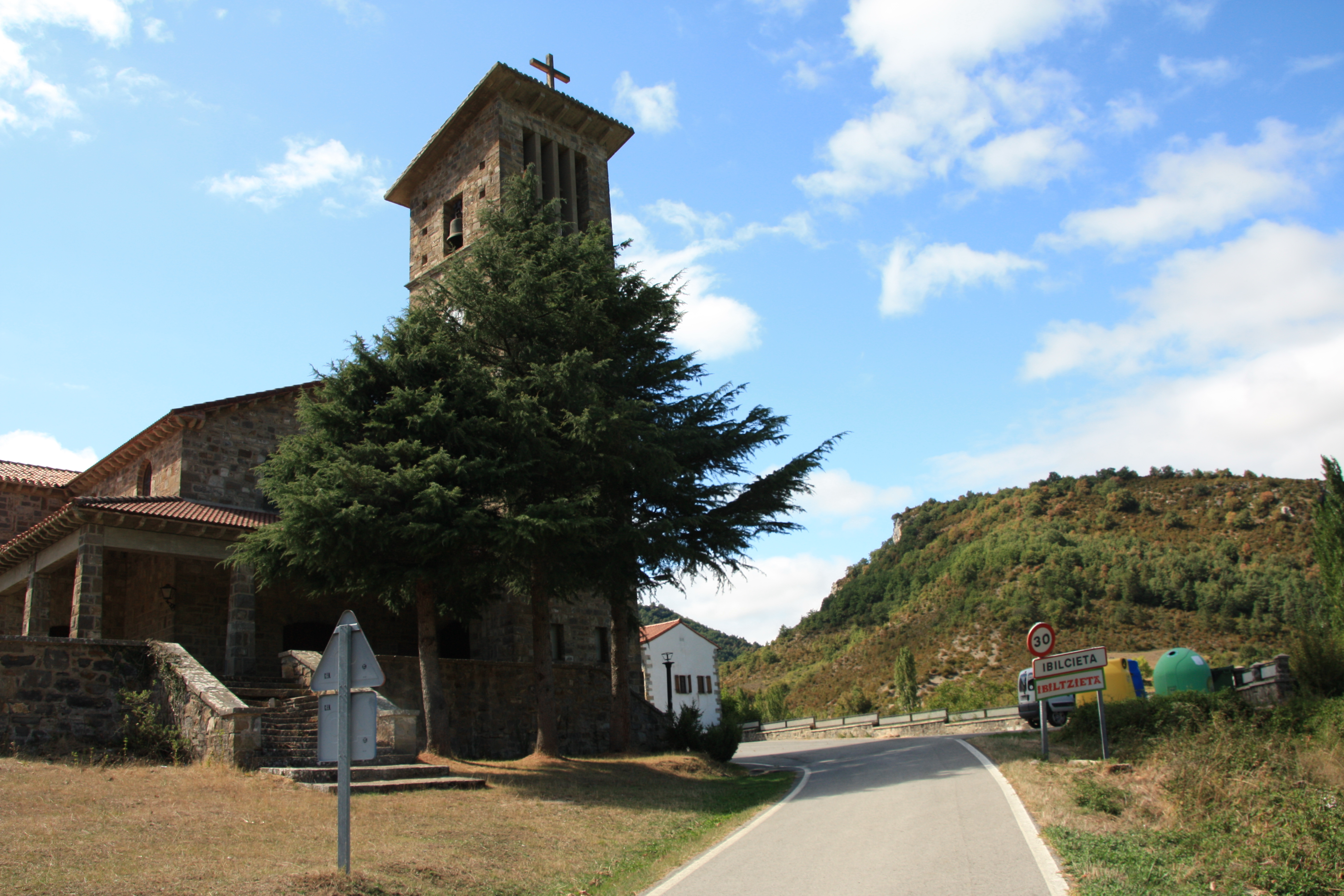

Sarriés – Sartze is a town and municipality located in the province and autonomous community of Navarre, northern Spain.
