= Manuel Martin (conquistador) =

Spanish nobleman and conquistador

Personal details
- Born: Spain
- Died: Viceroyalty of Peru
- Occupation: Government
- Profession: Notary

Manuel Martin (active in the 16th century) was a Spanish nobleman, conquistador, notary public of Asunción, Santa Fe, and Buenos Aires during the Viceroyalty of Peru.

== Biography ==
Manuel Martin was born in Spain, and arrived in Rio de la Plata in the expedition of Pedro de Mendoza. He was married to a native of Asunción. (parents Isabel, wife of Leonardo Gribeo).
