= Diego de Vega =

Portuguese merchant and financier

Personal details
- Born: 1570 Lisbon, Kingdom of Portugal
- Died: 26 July 1613 (aged 42–43) Buenos Aires, Viceroyalty of Peru
- Spouse: Blanca de Vasconcelos
- Occupation: Trader; Banker
- Profession: Financier

Diego de Vega (1570 – 26 July 1613) was a Portuguese merchant and financier. He was the first banker in Buenos Aires during the viceroyalty of Peru.

== Biography ==
Born 1570 in Lisbon, Portugal, belonging to a family of Jews converted to Catholicism. He arrived at the port of Buenos Aires in 1601 and was married on July 8, 1605, to Blanca de Vasconcelos, daughter of Mendo de Vasconcelos and Juana de Atouguia.

Diego de Vega had contacts in various regions outside the Viceroyalty of Peru, Brazil and Lisbon are some of the places where he operated his business of smuggling. He came to have great wealth, becoming the richest man in Buenos Aires in the early years of the 17th century, and also was listed as one of the strongest traders in the world in his time.
