= Ramón de Esparza =

- Lord
- Coat of Arms belonging to Esparza lineage
- Born: 14th century Kingdom of Navarre
- Died: c. 15th century Kingdom of Navarre

Ramón de Esparza (fl. 1390) was a Basque nobleman, knight and lord of the palace Esparza.

Ramón was born in Navarra, the son of Rodrigo de Esparza, belonging to the Basque nobility. He and his father were vassals of Charles III of Navarre, and both attended his coronation on February 13, 1390, in the Cathedral of Santa María.

Esparza served in the Hundred Years' War as Captain of the Garrison of Charles III in Cherbourg, Lower Normandy. In 1378, he sent an emissary to England to request help against the army of Charles V of France.
