= Francisco García Romero =

Spanish military man and conquistador

Alcalde of Buenos Aires
- In office 1617–1618
- Monarch: Philip III of Spain
- Preceded by: Gabriel Sánchez de Ojeda
- Succeeded by: Antón Higueras de Santana

Personal details
- Born: 1559 Cáceres, Spain
- Died: c. 1630 Buenos Aires, Argentina
- Occupation: Politician
- Profession: Army officer

Military service
- Allegiance: Spain
- Branch/service: Spanish Army
- Rank: Captain

Francisco García Romero (1559–1630s) was a Spanish military man and conquistador.

== Biography ==
Francisco was born in 1559 in Cáceres, Spain, son of Francisco García Moroto and Inés Martin. He arrived in the Rio de la Plata in 1603, occupying distinguished political positions in the city, where served as alcalde, fiel ejecutor, attorney general and deputy of the Cabildo of Buenos Aires.

Francisco García Romero married in Asunción to Mariana González de Santa Cruz, daughter of Bartolomé González de Villaverde and María Santa Cruz, belonging to a distinguished family of conquerors.
