= Blas de Peralta =

Spanish nobleman, military man and conquistador

Blas de Peralta Arteaga

Alcalde of Córdoba
- In office 1591–1592
- Monarch: Philip II

Personal details
- Born: Blas Fernández de Peralta y Porcel de Arteaga; 1534 Granada, Spain
- Died: 1592 (aged 57–58) Córdoba, Argentina
- Spouse: Catalina de Cabrera
- Occupation: Politician
- Profession: Army's officer

Military service
- Allegiance: Spain
- Branch/service: Spanish Army
- Rank: Conquistador

Blas de Peralta (1534–1592) was a Spanish nobleman, military man and conquistador of the Córdoba del Tucuman. He was the founder of the Porcel de Peralta family in Argentina, whose descendants had an outstanding political participation during the colonial and post colonial period.

== Biography ==
Peralta was born 1534 in Granada, Spain, the son of Pedro Fernández de Peralta y Porcel and Úrsula de Arteaga, belonging to a family of noble lineage. He arrived in the San Miguel de Tucumán in the expedition of Jerónimo Luis de Cabrera, then attended to the foundation of Córdoba,

Blas de Peralta held various positions of high rank during the first colonial period in Argentina, serving as Alcalde of San Clemente de la Nueva Sevilla, alderman three time 1581,1583 and 1585. His highest position was as Mayor and Attorney general of the Province of Córdoba.
