= Fuerte de Buenos Aires =

Spanish fortress of the city of Buenos Aires during the colonial period

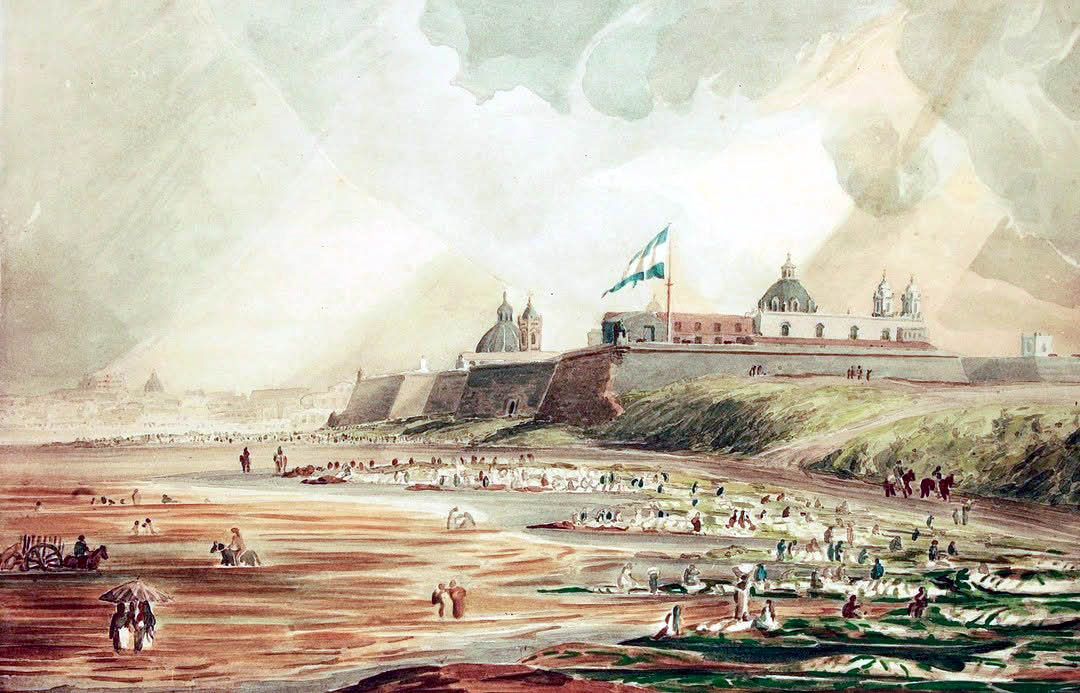
- Watercolor depicting El Fuerte and the playa baja, painting by Emeric Essex Vidal (in 1816), note that the Argentine flag was already flying at that time. The territory of the playa baja was filled in at the end of the 19th century and corresponds to the current Puerto Madero.

Site information
- Type: Military fortress
- Owner: Spanish Empire - until 1810
- Condition: Demolished

Location
- Area: Monserrat, Buenos Aires

Site history
- Built: 16th century
- Battles/wars: British invasions of the Río de la Plata

The Fort of Buenos Aires was a fortress destined to defend Buenos Aires and to be the seat of the Spanish colonial authorities in the city. Its construction began in 1595 and after several refurbishments it was finished only at the beginning of the 18th century, being demolished in 1882. It received the name of Real Fortaleza de Don Juan Baltasar de Austria (Royal Fortress of Don Juan Baltasar of Austria), and in the 17th century it was called Castillo de San Miguel Arcángel del Buen Ayre.

It was located on the banks of the Río de la Plata, which at that time was less than a hundred meters from the Plaza de Mayo. It occupied the same site that today occupies the Casa Rosada, seat of the executive power of the Argentine Republic. It had a stone wall, with a moat surrounding it, a drawbridge over the square, with bastions in its corners with cannons and interior buildings.

Acarette du Biscay, a French traveler, described it thus in 1658:

...[the city] has a small earthen fort overlooking the river encircled by a moat and mounts ten iron cannons being the largest caliber of twelve. The governor resides there and the garrison is composed of only 150 men in three companies, commanded by three captains appointed by the governor at his pleasure..."

— 1658.

== History ==
The Fort of Buenos Aires was built by order of the governor Fernando de Zárate, being designated with the name of Real Fortaleza de Don Juan Baltasar de Austria. Its construction began towards the middle of 1590s, in the land where the Government House is currently located. Originally the fortress had been raised for the defense of the city against possible incursions by pirates, was also the residence of the authorities of Buenos Aires.

Among the General Staff of the Fort of Buenos Aires were the Captains Francisco Pérez de Burgos, Miguel de Riglos, Miguel Gerónimo de Esparza and his son Juan Miguel de Esparza, who had also served as Mayors of the City in various periods.

During the early 17th century, no major modifications were made to the structure of the Fort of Buenos Aires, being completely modified towards the year 1708, when the colonial authorities hired the Captain engineer José Bermúdez, who endowed the fort with a fortified wall. In 1725, the fort was modified again, this time by the engineer Domingo Petrarca.

Towards the middle of the 18th century, the Fort of Buenos Aires continued with the renovations, carried out by the Spanish engineer of British descent, Don Juan Bartolomé Howell. And later by the engineer Carlos Cabrer, who built a Chapel for the Viceroys.

During the British invasions of the River Plate, the Fort of Buenos Aires, was occupied by William Beresford, who resided in the fortification until surrendering to Santiago de Liniers. In 1810 the Fort of Buenos Aires, was used as the official residence of Cornelio Saavedra, president of the Primera Junta of Government.

In 1826, the President Bernardino Rivadavia, made important improvements in the Buenos Aires fort, including an iron gate to replace the rudimentary wooden gate.

== Gallery ==
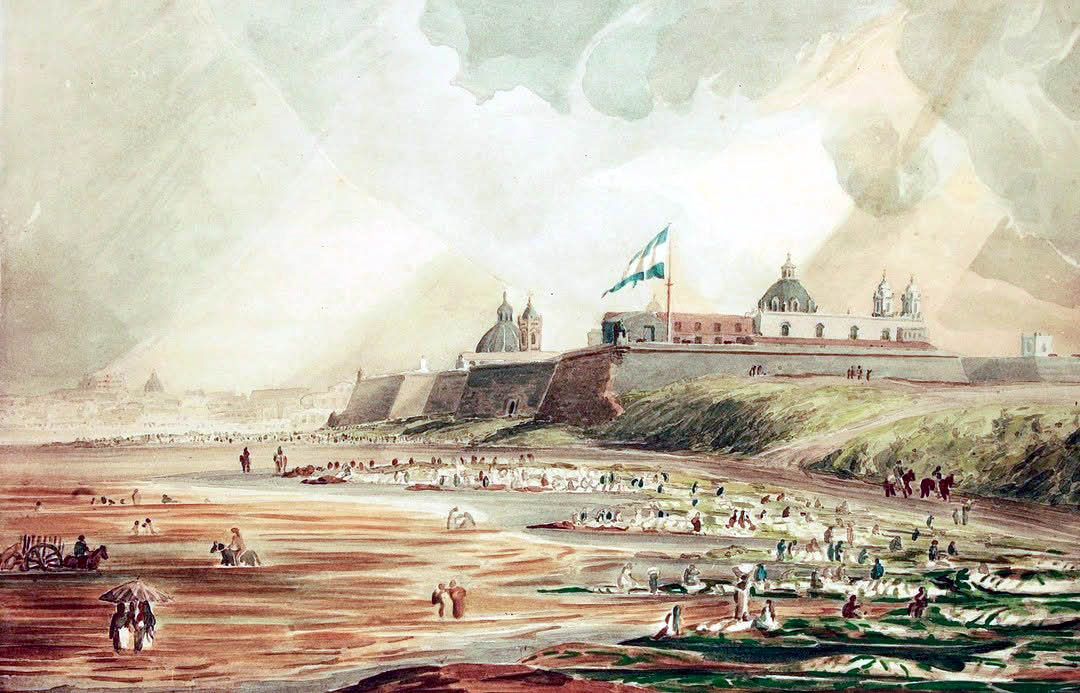
painter of the El Fuerte de Buenos Aires by Emeric Essex Vidal

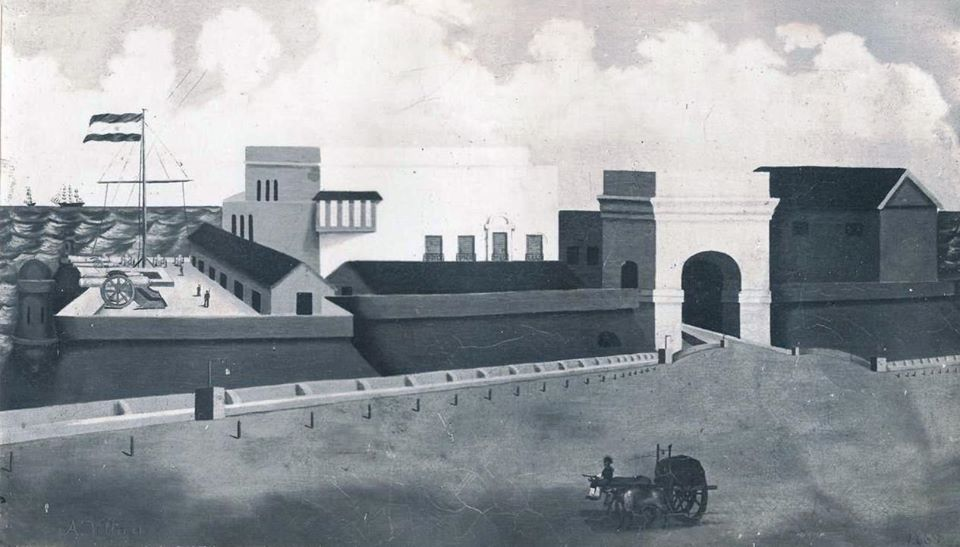
drawing of the Fuerte de Buenos Aires

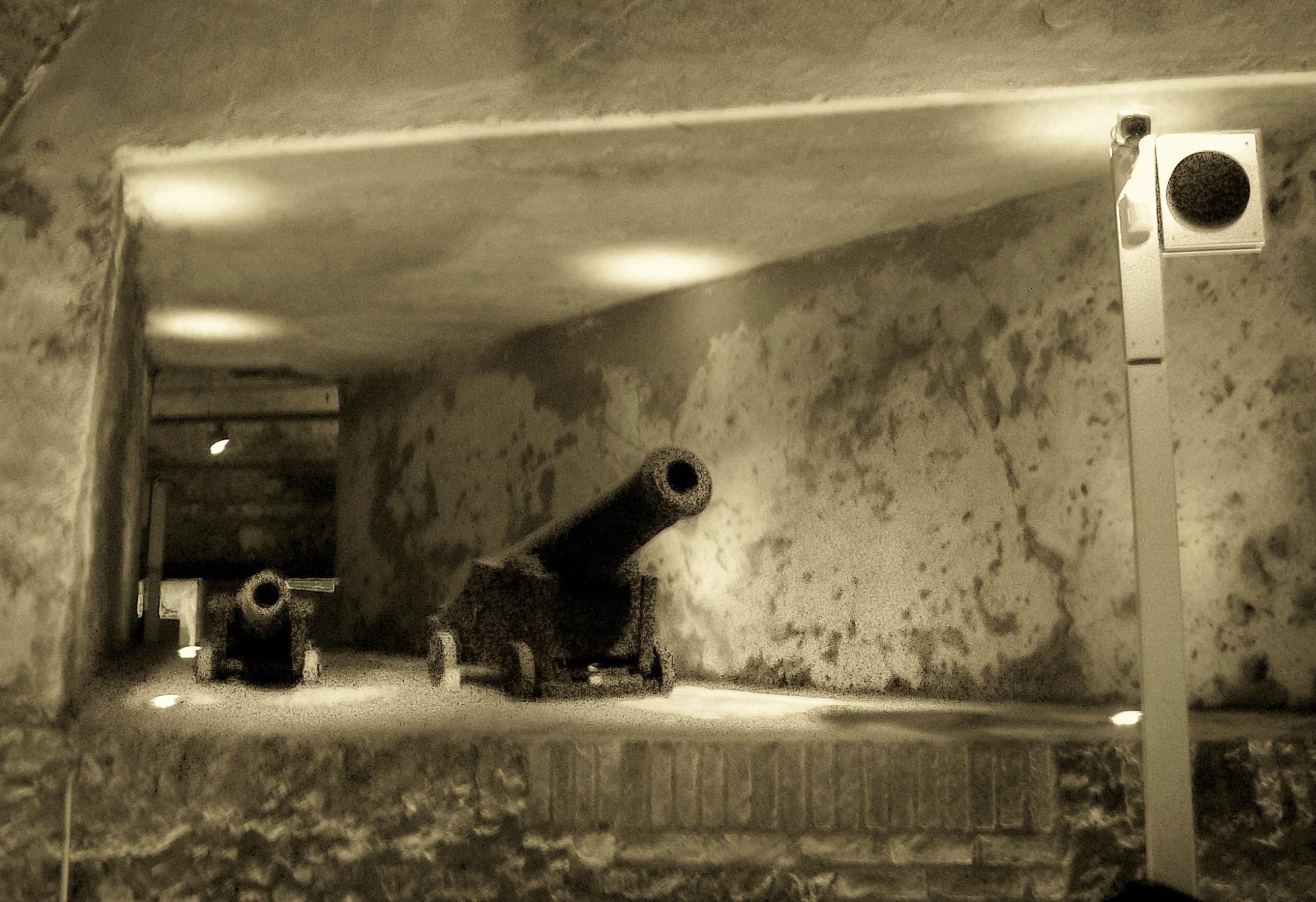
cannons of the Fuerte de Buenos Aires

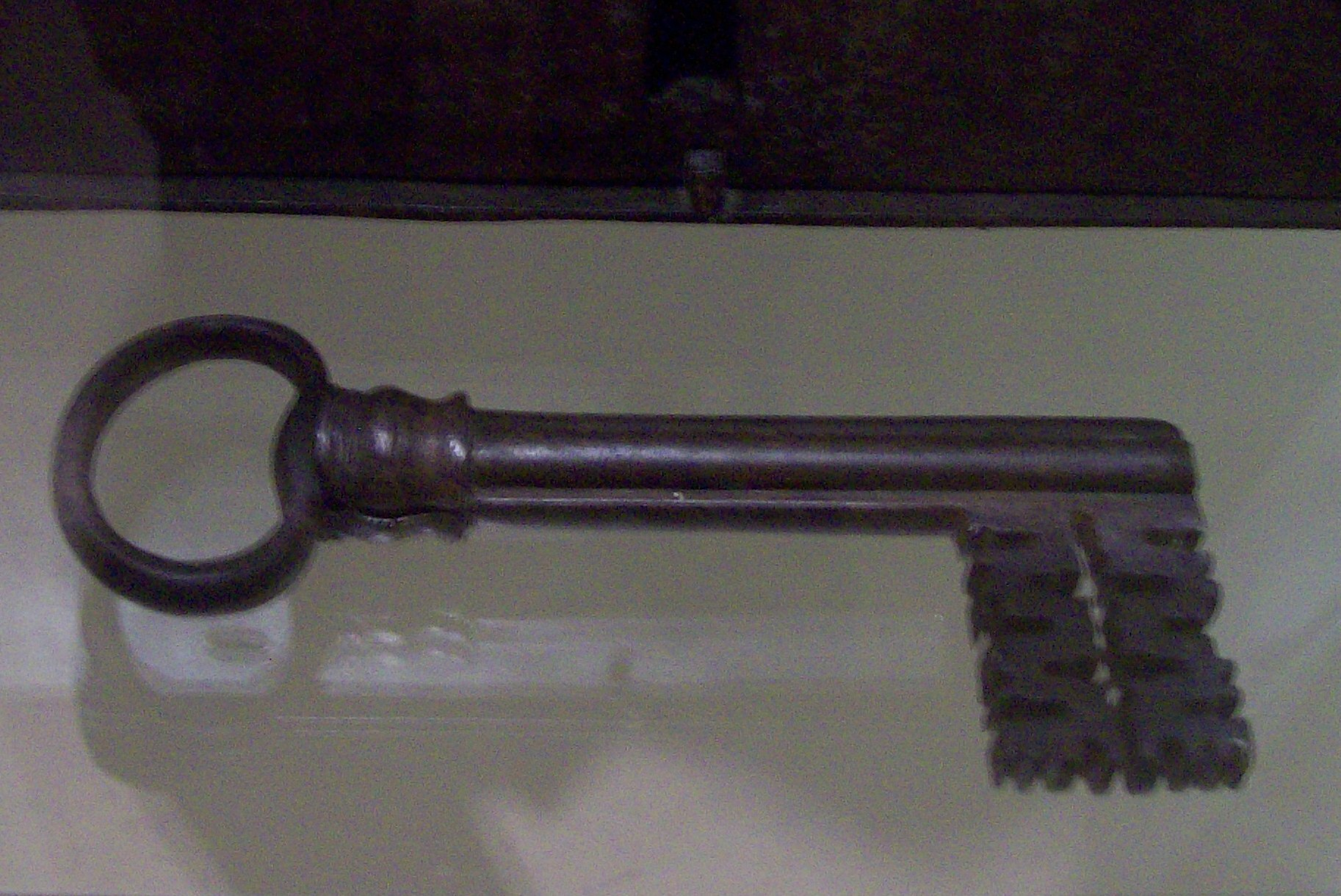
key to open the gate of the Fuerte de Buenos Aires

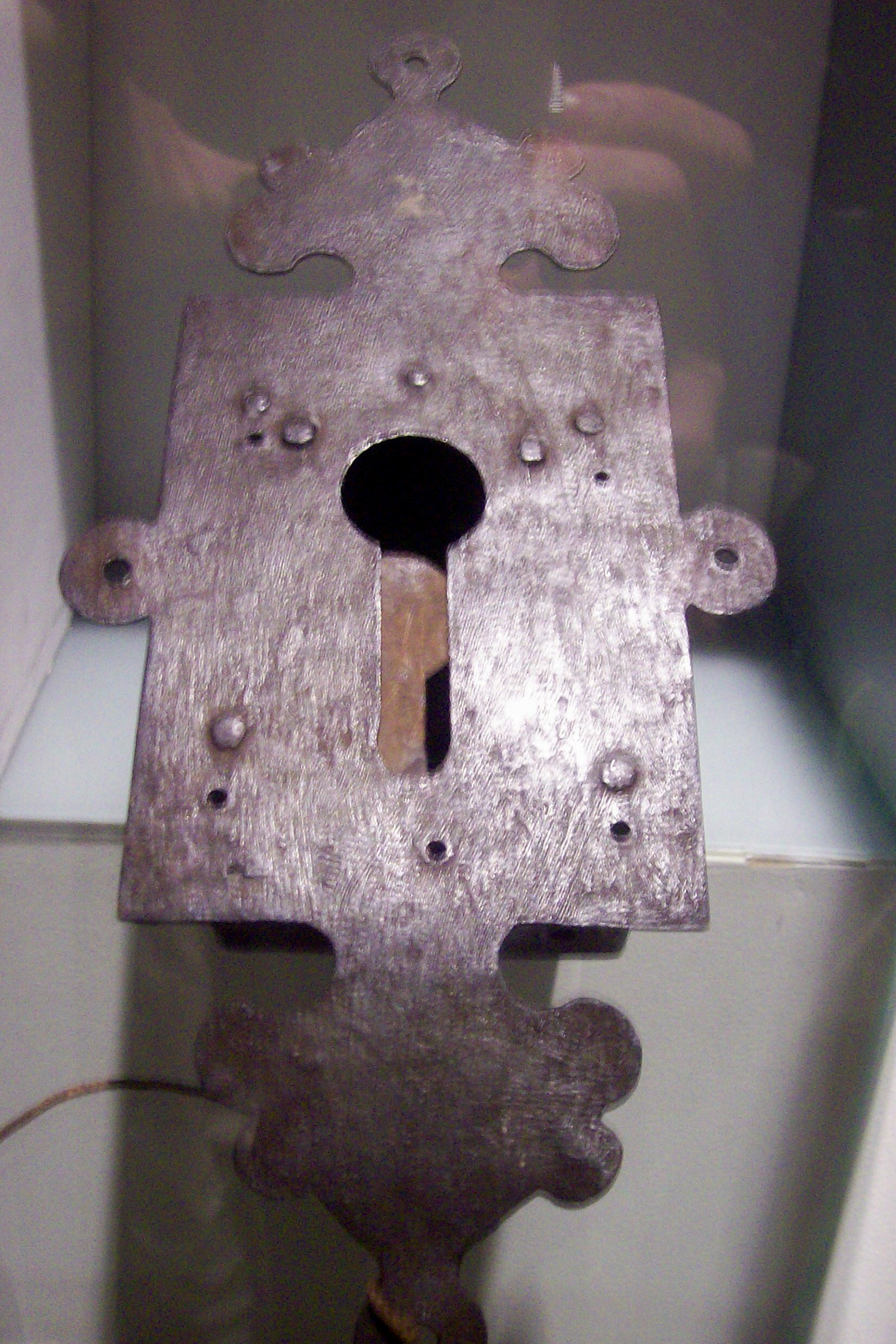
lock of the Fuerte de Buenos Aires

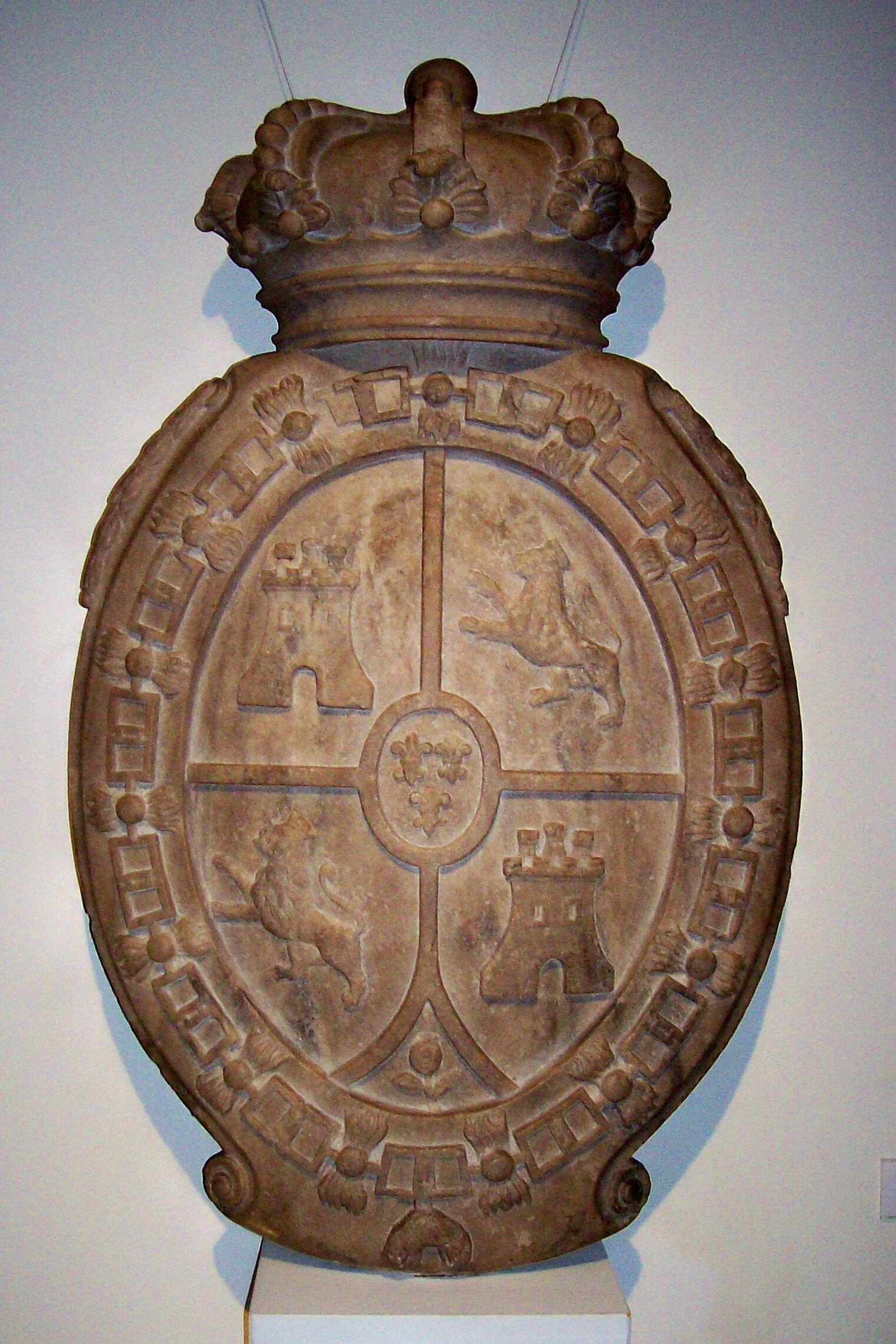
shield of the Fuerte de Buenos Aires

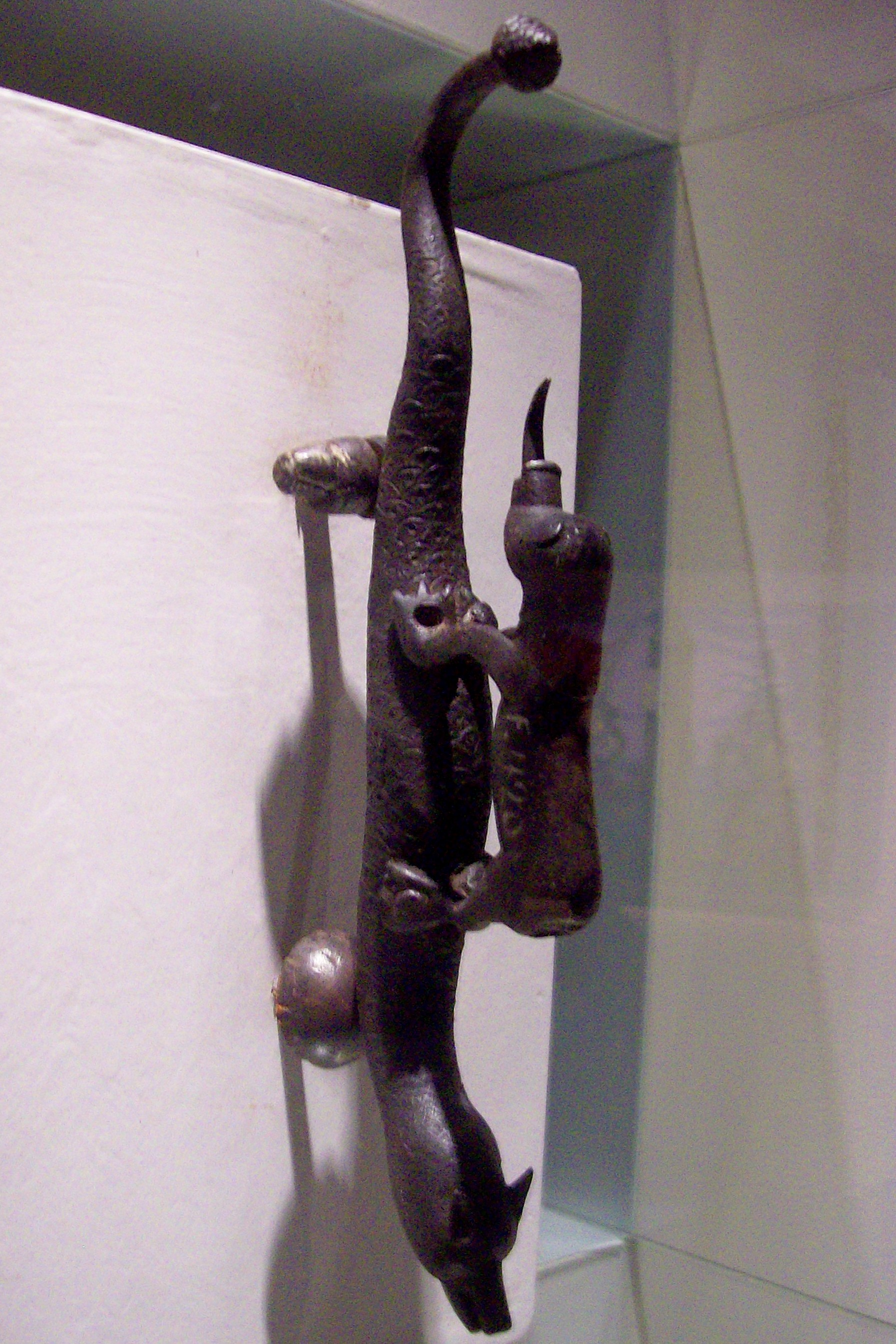
Doorknob that belonged to the Fuerte de Buenos Aires

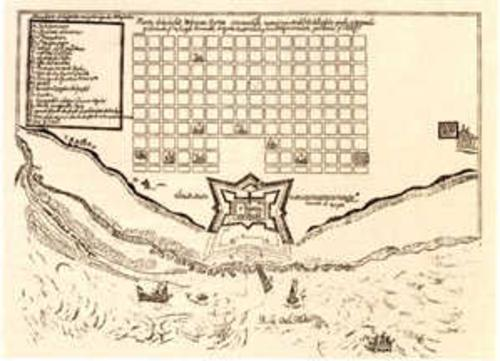
plane of the Fuerte de Buenos Aires by José Bermúdez

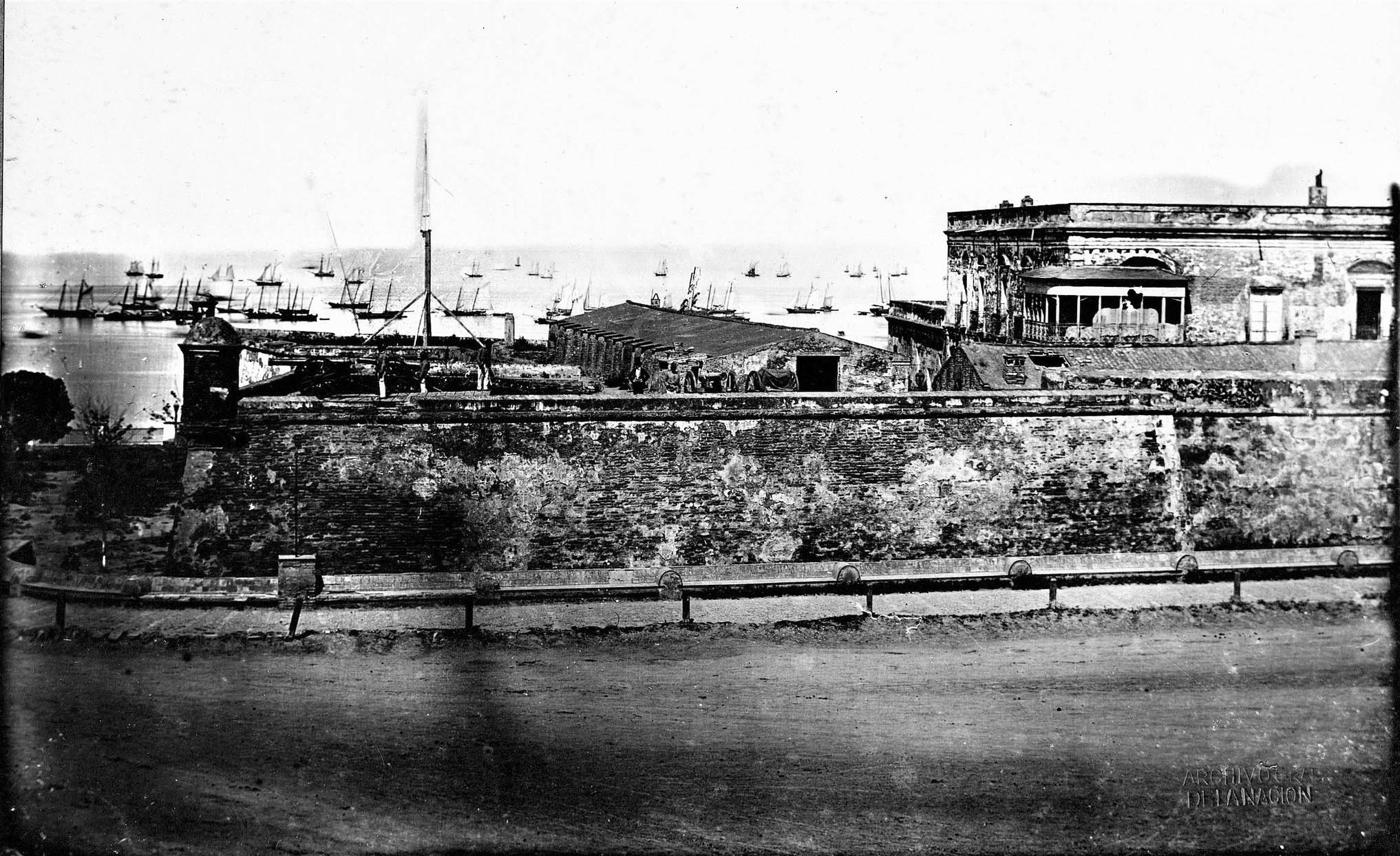
view from the northwest of the Fuerte de Buenos Aires
