= Amador Vaz de Alpoim =

Portuguese nobleman

General Amador Vaz de Alpoim
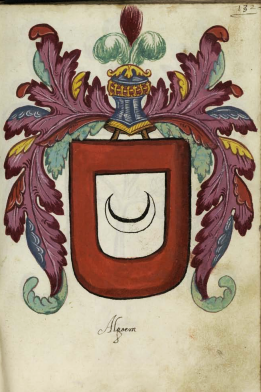
- Coat of Arms of Alpoim

Fidalgo in the service of the Spanish Empire
- In office ?–1617
- Monarchs: Philip II of Spain; Philip III of Spain

Personal details
- Born: 1568 Santa Maria Island, Azores, Kingdom of Portugal
- Died: May 26, 1617 (aged 48–49) Buenos Aires, Viceroyalty of Peru
- Spouse: Margarida Cabral de Melo
- Occupation: Conquistador explorer hacendado trader
- Profession: Officer of the Royal Armies
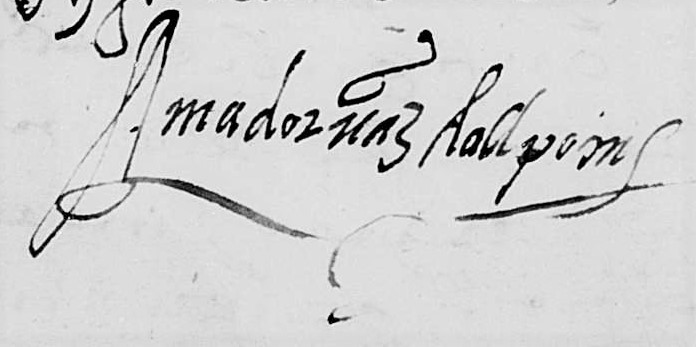
- Signature

Military service
- Allegiance: Spain
- Branch/service: Spanish Army
- Rank: General
- Battles/wars: Expedition against the Charrúas; Expedition of Hernandarias to Patagonia

Amador Vaz de Alpoim (1568–1617) was a Portuguese nobleman, who served as Officer of the Royal Armies, conquistador, colonizer and explorer of South America in the service of the Spanish Crown. He was the founder of the Cabral de Melo Alpoim family in the Río de la Plata, descendants of the first settlers of the Azores islands.

He maintained an active military participation in the Río de la Plata, taking part in the military expeditions led by Hernandarias de Saavedra.

== Biography ==
He was born in 1568, on Santa Maria Island (Azores), son of Estevan Alpoim and Isabel Velha, a family belonging to the Portuguese nobility. Towards the year 1598 he and his wife, Margarida Cabral de Melo, and their children arrived in Buenos Aires from Rio de Janeiro, city where the family had lived for some years.

Installed in Buenos Aires, the Alpoim family received parcels of land in the city and in the province, and obtained permission from the authorities to export products. He and all members of his family swore loyalty to the Monarch Philip III, King of Spain and Portugal, being enrolled in the Royal armies from the moment they arrived at the Río de la Plata. In 1604 the Captain Alpoim was part of the expedition organized by Hernando Arias de Saavedra in City of the Caesars, known as the expedición de Hernandarias a la Patagonia. That same year he participated in the exploration of the islas del Paraná. A failed expedition where Alpoim saved the life of Hernandarias, when this fell from his horse, and was about to be killed by tribes Charruas.

In his youth, Alpoim had been involved in the introduction of slaves from Angola to Brazil. In the early 1600s, he renounce their activities as slave-trader, to devote himself exclusively to his ranch, where he was engaged in raising cattle and wine production.

Amador Vaz de Alpoim became one of the most powerful men of the Río de la Plata, where he received encomiendas from the Kings of Spain, receiving also permission for the exploitation of cimarrón cattle. He was the owner of a large number of haciendas in the province of Buenos Aires, including farms in the current locations of Avellaneda, Quilmes, Lomas de Zamora and Monte Grande.

== Family and Ancestors ==
Amador Vaz de Alpoim was married in the Azores to Margarita Cabral de Melo, daughter of Matias Nunes Cabral and Maria Simões de Melo, belonging to a noble family, among whose numerous ancestors are found Martim Afonso de Melo and Briolanja de Sousa, a direct descendant of Afonso III of Portugal.

Amador Vaz de Alpoin belonged to the first colonizing families of the Azores. His grandparents were Estêvão Pires de Alpoim, a known notary of the Islands, and Grimanesa Pires, daughter of Pedro Vaz Marinheiro, a rich and powerful sailor.

Some of their ancestors were connected through maternal lineages with several European royal houses such as Álvaro Pires Pinheiro Lobo, and Martim Gonçalves de Lacerda. His families also came from Portuguese nobles linked to the French and English aristocracy, like Luís de Alpoim and John Falconet.

His sons Amador Báez de Alpoim and Manuel Cabral de Melo, had a preponderant role in the political and military life of Argentina during the colonial period.

At least two Argentine presidents (Marcelo Torcuato de Alvear and Agustín Pedro Justo) were descendants of Amador Vaz de Alpoim and Margarida Cabral de Melo. Juan Manuel de Rosas and Justo José de Urquiza, were descendants of Gil Gonçalves de Moura and Inês Nunes Cabral, brothers in law of Amador Vaz de Alpoim.
