= Lacerda (surname) =

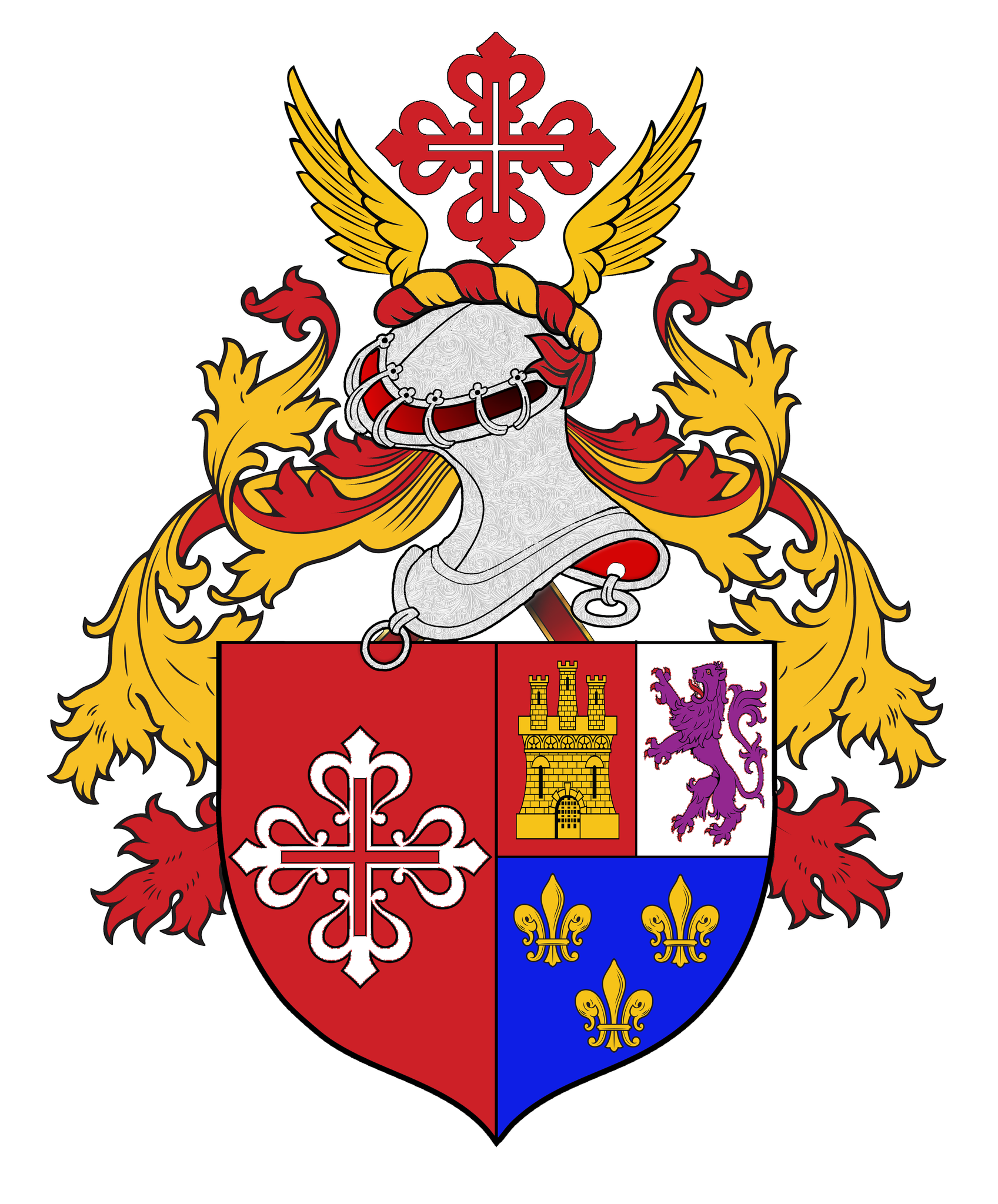
Coat of arms of Pereira de Lacerda, one of the many branches of the Lacerda family

Lacerda is a Portuguese surname, most probably stemming from the Castilian house of La Cerda, from whence the name came through agglutination. Its presence is attested in Portugal at least from the final decades of the 14th century.

== History ==
The first member of La Cerda to enter Portugal was João Afonso de Lacerda who had married a bastard daughter of D. Dinis. He remained in Portugal until 1337, when he returned to Castile, since Portugal had entered a war with its neighbour.

One nephew, Afonso Fernando de La Cerda, came to Portugal as a refugee since he had supported the losing faction of Peter the Cruel in a civil war against his half-brother Henry of Trastamara for the throne of Castille. Once in Portugal he married for a second time to Violante Pereira, half-sister of the future constable of Portugal Nuno Álvares Pereira . From this marriage they had, among others Álvaro Gonçalves de Serpa, cited incorrectly in the genealogies as Martim Gonçalves de Lacerda, which was in fact Álvaro's son's name. Álvaro lived in the Portuguese town of Serpa. According to one handwritten genealogy, he was a page of Fernando I of Portugal . He supported the party of the House of Avis against the pretensions of Juan I of Castile to inherit the Portuguese throne, since the former king Fernando had died without a male heir and the Castilan king was married to Fernando's only daughter. There is documentation that attests that this Álvaro Gonçalves was resident in Serpa in 1384, and it was also here that he married the daughter of a local lord, owner of the present Clock Tower of the town, Diogo Nunes de Serpa, who was a supporter of the party of Avis in the civil war, as confirmed in the "Chronicle of king John I", by the Portuguese chronicler Fernão Lopes.

From this marriage of Álvaro Gonçalves de Serpa came several children, listed below:

- Martim Gonçalves de Lacerda, wrongly considered in some genealogies as his father, not in the genealogy being considered here
- Constança, who married Garcia Afonso do Casal
- Isabel Pereira de Lacerda,
- Diogo Nunes de Serpa, named as his grandfather, being the Diogo grandson the father of Nuno Pereira de Lacerda.

All above considered, all Lacerda descendants can be assumed to be of the Pereira de Lacerda branch, since all descend from the marriage of Afonso Fernando de La Cerda with Violante Pereira.

For a more complete list of relatives of this family, look at the list on the Lacerda article page.
