= Nuno Pereira =

Nuno Pereira may refer to:

- Nuno Álvares Pereira (1360–1451), Portuguese general and mystic
- Nuno Pereira de Lacerda (1425–1509), Portuguese nobleman
- Nuno Álvares Pereira (governor), Portuguese colonial governor
- Nuno Álvares Pereira de Melo, 1st Duke of Cadaval (1638–1725), Portuguese general and nobleman
- Nuno Pereira (musician) (born 1979), American musician
- Nuno Pereira (footballer) (born 1997), Macanese footballer
