= Amador Báez de Alpoim, General =

Spanish army officer and politician

General Amador Báez de Alpoim

Lieutenant Governor of Corrientes In office (1636) (1640) (1647–1648)
- Preceded by: Juan de Avedaño
- Succeeded by: Juan de Vargas Machuca

Lieutenant Governor of Santa Fe
- In office 1641–1641
- Preceded by: Bernabé de Garay
- Succeeded by: Diego de las Casas

Alcalde de la Hermandad of Buenos Aires
- In office 1629–1630
- Preceded by: ?
- Succeeded by: ?

Personal details
- Born: Amador Báez de Alpoim y Cabral de Melo; 1602 Buenos Aires, Viceroyalty of Peru
- Died: 1652 (aged 49–50) Buenos Aires, Viceroyalty of Peru
- Spouse: Ana Romero de Santa Cruz
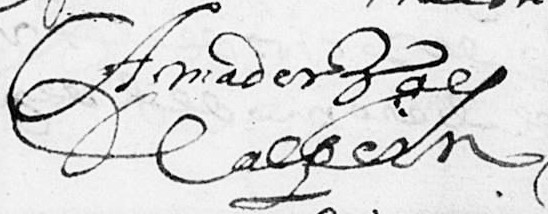
- Signature

Military service
- Allegiance: Spanish Empire
- Branch/service: Spanish Army
- Years of service: 1618–1652
- Rank: General
- Unit: Fuerte de Buenos Aires

Amador Báez de Alpoim (1602–1652) was a Spanish army officer and politician, who served during the Viceroyalty of Peru as alcalde of Buenos Aires and Lieutenant Governor of Corrientes and Santa Fe (Argentina).

== Biography ==
He was born in Buenos Aires, son of Amador Vaz de Alpoim and Margarita Cabral de Melo, belonging to a family of Portuguese nobility established in the city. His parents had arrived in the Río de la Plata in the expedition of Diego Rodriguez de Valdés from Rio de Janeiro, where they had lived for some time.

He probably did his studies in El Colegio de los Jesuítas, located in front of the Fort of Buenos Aires.

Amador Báez de Alpoim held some high positions of government during the colonial period of Argentina. In 1629, he was appointed Alcalde de la hermandad, performing in the suburban areas of the province of Buenos Aires. In 1636 Alpoin bought in Potosí the title of Alférez Real, an honorary position in which the alferez carried the Royal Standard in the days of festival and in the official ceremonies, especially in the day of Saint Martin of Tours.

He had an active participation in the area of the Argentine Littoral. He was appointed as Lieutenant Governor of Santa Fé in 1640, and also he served for several periods in Corrientes Province.

In 1636 the General Amador Báez de Alpoim, led expeditions against the tribes of Serranos (inhabitants of sierra de Tandil), who had attacked the tribes Pampas (inhabited the plain).

He also devoted himself to commerce, the agriculture and livestock (Cimarron Cattle). By 1632 he had received important Indian encomiendas, by the Viceroy of Peru Luis Jerónimo de Cabrera. He had also received a "encomienda" in Ylaty (Corrientes) composed of Guarani Indians.

== Family ==
Amador Báez de Alpoim was married to Ana Romero de Santa Cruz, daughter of Francisco García Romero and Mariana González de Santa Cruz, born in Asunción (Paraguay). He and his wife were the parents of several children, including Juan Báez de Alpoim, baptized on July 23, 1645, in Buenos Aires.

The luxurious house where the Cabral de Melo Alpoim family lived had among other luxuries a Turret overlooking the coast of the Río de la Plata. It was located at the current intersections of Hipólito Yrigoyen between Balcarce and Defensa.

He had five brothers, Cristóbal Cabral de Melo (regidor), Manuel Cabral de Alpoim (lieutenant governor), Matías Cabral de Melo (cleric), Juan (captain), Antonio, and three sisters Isabel, María and Margarita.

Amador Báez de Alpoim was a descendant by direct paternal line of medieval knights of French origin, and through his mother descendant of Afonso III of Portugal. His wife was niece of Roque González de Santa Cruz, who was proclaimed saint by Pope John Paul II in 1988.
