= Pedro Annes d'Alpoim =

- Fidalgo
- Born: 15th Century; Coimbra, Kingdom of Portugal
- Died: 16th Century; Azores, Kingdom of Portugal
- Noble family: Alpuims
- Spouse: África Anes
- Occupation: Militia

Pedro Annes d'Alpoim (c. 1475-1500s) was a Portuguese nobleman, conquistador and one of the first settlers of Azores.

== Biography ==
Alpoim was possibly born in Coimbra, Portugal, belonging to a noble family of French and Portuguese roots. He was grandson of Alvaro d'Alpuim, Lord of Azinhaga, who had served in the court of King John I of Portugal. He also was descendant of Lopo de Alpoim, Alcaide of Montemor-o-Velho.

Alpoim was married to Affrica Annes, daughter of Gonçalo Anes de Samadeça and Simoa de Sá, a prestigious family related to the first settlers of the Azores. His wife was the widow of Jorge Velho, nephew of the King of Fez.

Pedro Annes d'Alpoim had arrived at Azores Islands in company of his father Rui Fernandes de Alpoim, being of the first settlers and colonizers. His father was member of the Court of Afonso V of Portugal, and served as ambassador to Flanders. And his son Estêvão Pires de Alpoim, served as judicial authority in the Azores.
