= José Máximo De La Cerda y Palafox =

The Most Excellent The Count of Parcent

Privy Councillor to HM the Queen Regent
- In office 11 October 1832 – 11 September 1834
- Monarch: Maria Christina of Bourbon

Senator of the Kingdom of Spain
- In office 28 February 1838 – 3 April 1843 10 October 1849 – 16 February 1851 (life senator)
- Monarch: Maria Christina, Queen Regent Isabella II
- Constituency: Valencia

Prócer of the Kingdom
- In office 11 September 1834 – 28 February 1838
- Monarch: Maria Christina, Queen Regent
- Constituency: Valencia

Personal details
- Born: 18 November 1794, Palace of Parcent, Valencia, Kingdom of Spain
- Died: 16 February 1851 (aged 56), Palace of Parcent, Madrid, Kingdom of Spain
- Party: Moderates
- Spouse(s): Marie Gand-Villain et de la Rochefoucauld de Bayers, Vicomtess du Gand, Princesse de la Rochefoucauld
- Children: Maria Josefa De la Cerda y Gand María del Pilar De la Cerda y Gand, Duchess consort of Veragua Juan De la Cerda y Gand, 8th Count of Parcent Emilia De la Cerda y Gand Virginia De la Cerda y Gand, 7th Marchioness of Eguaras, Countess consort of Vegamar
- Parent(s): José Antonio De la Cerda y Marín, 5th Marquess of Bárboles, María de Palafox y Portocarrero
- Profession: Academic, senator, politician, aristocrat

José Máximo Agustín de la Cerda y Palafox, 6th Marquess of Bárboles, 7th Count of Parcent, etc., (Valencia, 18 November 1794 – Madrid, 16 February 1851), was a Spanish aristocrat, academic and politician, member of one of the most prominent noble families in Spain, the House of De la Cerda, and who was proximate to the tendencies of Moderate Liberalism, a mid-term between reactionary liberalism and absolutism. José de la Cerda was an important figure of the early 19th century, which witnessed the development of Spanish parliamentarianism in the unstable era of transition between the Ancién Regime and Liberalism. José De la Cerda, known by his title of Count of Parcent, was a proximate figure to Queen Maria Christina, last wife of Ferdinand VII of Spain and mother and regent to Queen Isabella II. Parcent was one of the aristocrats who supported a moderate tendency of Liberalism (the Moderates) against both the extreme versions of Liberalism (the Progresistas) and absolutism (Carlists).

Parcent was a leading member of Spanish society and a part of that Spanish aristocracy which opted for a mid-term between Liberalism and Absolutism in order to secure at least some of the privileges of Spain's ancient nobility, the Grandees of Spain. Parcent married a Franco-Spanish aristocrat, Marie Gand-Villain et de la Rochefoucauld de Bayers, who had been born in Barcelona in 1796 and who was a descendant of the last Prince of the Rochefoucauld and Marquess of Bayers in France. They fathered five children who were married into important aristocratic families such as the Veraguas or the Drakes.

== Background and family ==
Parcent was born on November 18, 1794, in the Parcent Palace in Valencia. His father was José Antonio De la Cerda Cernesio y Marín de Resende (1771–1825), 5th Marquess of Bárboles, 6th Count of Parcent, 5th Marquess of Eguaras, 6th Marquess of Fuente el Sol, 5th Count of Villar, 6th Count of Bureta, 4th Count of Contamina, 4th Viscount of Medinanieta, Grandee of Spain, and of María Ramona de Palafox y Portocarrero, daughter of the Dukes of Peñaranda del Duero, Counts of Montijo, etc. As part of the most exquisite sectors of society, Parcent received a refined education in History, Literature, Languages and Politics, which was supervised by his grandfather the 5th Count of Parcent. His early childhood was characterised by a severe blow to the prestige of his family when, after 1796, the Royal Audience of Aragon (high court of Aragon) ruled that the County of Bureta was passed to the House of Marín de Resende, instead of passing on to the House of Parcent, after a lawsuit which had begun almost ten years earlier in 1785.

In 1814, as the War of Independence came to an end and the French troops exited Spain, Ferdinand VII was restored a legitimate ruler. During the War, in 1812, the Cortes had come together in Cádiz and issued the 1st Spanish Constitution ("La Pepa") which installed a Liberal political system in Spain which the king had to accept upon his return. Nevertheless, the grand aristocracy, the Parcents among them, directed the king to Valencia upon his return from exile, where the issued the Manifest of Persians, a document in which they stated that absolute rule was required in order to conjure the anarchy which had emerged from war and the liberal doctrines brought by the French Revolution.

José's family, nevertheless, was torn apart. Whilst his father and grandfather, the Parcents, were royalists and supporters of the Restoration of absolutism, his uncle, his mother's brother, Cipriano de Palafox y Portocarrero, 13th Duke of Peñaranda de Duero, was a confessed Liberal, Mason and supporter of Joseph I, Napoleon's brother, for whom he had fought during the War of Independence. His uncle was forced into exile but would return to Spain in 1817, after Ferdinand VII pardoned him and allowed him to live in Málaga, always under severe vigilance. Cipriano Palafox was one of the conspirators who installed the Liberal regime in 1820 after a coup against Ferdinand VII.

In the meantime, whilst his family was torn apart by political ideology, José married in 1814 Marie Gand-Villain et de la Rochefoucauld, a Franco-Spanish aristocrat. She had been born in Barcelona yet she descended from one of the most prominent noble families of France, which had been shattered by Revolution in previous years. Marie Gand-Vilain held the titles of Vicomtess du Gand and Countess of the Holy Roman Empire although these titles were never recognised in Spain. The couple had five children; Marie died in 1824, soon after giving birth to their last daughter, Virginia.

== Adulthood and political life ==
In 1825, upon his father's death, José De la Cerda inherited all of his father's titles except the County of Bureta which had been passed to his cousins.

As Ferdinand VII grew weaker and liberalism became stronger in Spain, politics became polarised. Parcent was to integrate the sector of nobility which embraced reformed absolutism: after absolutism had been restored after the short liberal period (1820-23), some of the traditional ancien regime institutions, such as the Holy Inquisition, were forsaken. Parcent supported a mild moderation of absolutism in order to appease the exalted liberals and against the Apostolics, the factions which supported the succession of the Infante Carlos María Isidro, claiming the exigency of the Salic Law which banned women from succession. Given that Ferdinand VII only had daughters, the most reactionary sectors of court supported his brother which was partisan of installing traditional absolutism, a formula which could only lead to a new liberal revolution such as that of 1820. It is in this context of a fight between Apostolics (later called Carlists) and Moderates whilst the king died, that the queen consort, Maria Christina of the Two-Sicilies, made Parcent her privy councilor and close confidant in preparing the succession of Isabella II and the transition towards a Moderate Liberalism.

As privy councillor to the queen regent, Parcent had an important influence in politics after the death of Ferdinand VII. He exerted a great influence upon the queen and influenced the appointment of the first prime ministers of the regency, Francisco Cea Bermúdez and Francisco Martínez de la Rosa. Parcent was a close collaborator in the creation of the Royal Statute of 1834, elaborated by De la Rosa, which was royal charter (following the model of the French Restoration) which provided for a bicameral parliament similar to France's: a chamber of peers (Estamento de Próceres) and a chamber of deputies (Estamento de Procuradores). The members of the upper chamber, the próceres, were appointed by the monarch from the aristocracy, the military and the clergy; the members of the lower chamber, the procuradores, were elected via restricted suffrage. The Royal Statute wasn't a constitution as such but a pact between monarch and subjects by which the Crown relinquished some of its divine powers. It was a moderate version of liberalism which was too liberal for the Carlists and too absolutist for the liberals and thus confronted serious opposition. Once the Statute was promulgated in late 1834, the queen regent chose Parcent as procurator of the upper chamber. Parcent thus began his career as parliamentary. From the Estamento of Próceres, Parcent developed a fierce defence of the royal charter against those which deemed it too liberal or too autocratic. His time as prócer was complicated for he had to defend the regent's unstable governments throughout the crises of the Carlist war, the uprisings in Barcelona and the attacks of the Luddites. Furthermore, even though the Statute was promulgated, it cost De la Rosa's premiership and hence Parcent had to defend an institution which no longer counted with its creator.

As the Progressive Party (the exalted liberals) took power in 1837 and drafter a constitution which was based on the 1812 Constitution, Parcent became a member of the Senate, the upper chamber which succeeded the Estamento of Próceres. He became acquainted with the Moderates, although he was never part of the archconservative sectors of the party. Parcent was named in 1836 high steward of the Infante Francisco de Paula, Ferdinand VII's younger brother, who was close with the Liberal ideals, and he later entered the Royal Academy of Fine Arts of Saint Ferdinand, one of the enlightened institutions which promoted Liberal values.

In 1843, when the leader of the Moderates, the Duke of Valencia, took power, Parcent was elected deputy in the Congress until 1849, when for his services to the Crown he was made a life senator, granted the Collar of the Order of the Golden Fleece.

== Marriage and children ==
Parcent only married once but widowed on April 30, 1824, when Marie Gand-Vilain died soon after giving birth to their last child in their palace in Madrid. They had five children:

- María Luisa de la Cerda y Gand-Villain Rochefoucauld, (22 October 1815 – 3 May 1881), who married Francisco Bertodano y López.
- María del Pilar de la Cerda y Gand-Villain Rochefoucauld, (20 October 1816 – 28 February 1882), married to Pedro Colón de Larraétegui y Ramírez de Baquedano, 13th Duke of Veragua, 13th Marquess of Jamaica, Admiral of the Ocean Sea and Grandee of Spain.
- Juan Evangelista de la Cerda y Gand-Villain Rochefoucauld (27 December 1817 – 17 August 1870), who became 7th Marquess of Bárboles, 8th Count of Parcent... and succeeded his father in all of his titles. He married Fernanda de Carvajal y Queralt. Alfonso XIII of Spain elevated the county of Parcent to the peerage of duchy of Parcent in 1916, to his grandson.
- Emilia de la Cerda y Gand-Villain Rochefoucauld (25 September 1819 – 24 March 1842), who died at the age of 22 without offspring.
- María Virginia de la Cerda y Gand-Villain Rochefoucauld (18 April 1824 – 3 December 1909). She was Parcent's favorite daughter and hence inherited the title of 7th Marchioness of Eguaras despite being the youngest. Her birth caused the death of Marie Gand-Villain. She married Carlos Drake y del Castillo, Count of Vegamar and Viscount Escambray, in 1847, and had many children among them Emilio Drake De la Cerda, 1st Marquess of Cañada Honda.

== Death ==
José De la Cerda died in the Parcent Palace of Madrid on February 11, 1851, aged 56. He died in disgrace after the death of his wife and of her daughter Emilia. He gave all of his titles to his son and heir Juan Evangelista except that the Marquisate of Eguaras, given to his younger daughter Virginia (Virginia named his youngest son, Emilio, after her deceased elder sister). His daughter Virginia kept many of his estates and properties in Madrid, among them, the palace in the Calle Barquillo 14 and the palace in Paseo Castellana 19, which are still standing.

=== Styles ===
18 November 1794 – 16 March 1814: The Most Excellent, Señor Don José Máximo De la Cerda-Cernesio y Palafox

16 March 1814 – 26 July 1825: The Most Excellent Marquess of Fuente el Sol

26 July 1825 – 12 January 1849: The Most Excellent Count of Parcent, Marquess of Bárboles, Marquess of Eguaras, Marquess of Fuente el Sol, etc., Grandee of Spain, Life Senator of the Kingdom of Spain.

12 January 1849 – 11 February 1851: The Most Excellent Count of Parcent, Marquess of Bárboles, Marquess of Fuente el Sol, etc. Grandee of Spain, Life Senator.

=== Titles and honours ===
José De la Cerda was twice a Grandee of Spain, the highest rank of Spanish nobility, and held several peerages of the Kingdom of Spain, inherited from his father:

- 6th Marquess of Bárboles, Grandee of Spain
- 7th Count of Parcent, Grandee of Spain
- 6th Marquess of Fuente el Sol
- 6th Marquess of Eguaras
- 6th Count of Villar
- 6th Count of Contamina
- 5th Viscount of Medinueta

Throughout his life, José De la Cerda was awarded with several honours:

- Collar of the Order of the Golden Fleece
- Knight of the Sovereign and Military Order of Malta
- Knight of the Royal Maestranza of Valencia
