= Pancho Guedes =

Portuguese artist and architect (1925–2015)

- Born: Amâncio d'Alpoim Miranda Guedes; 13 May 1925; Lisbon, Portugal
- Died: 7 November 2015 (aged 90); Graaff-Reinet, South Africa
- Occupation: Architect
- Spouse: Dorothy Guedes

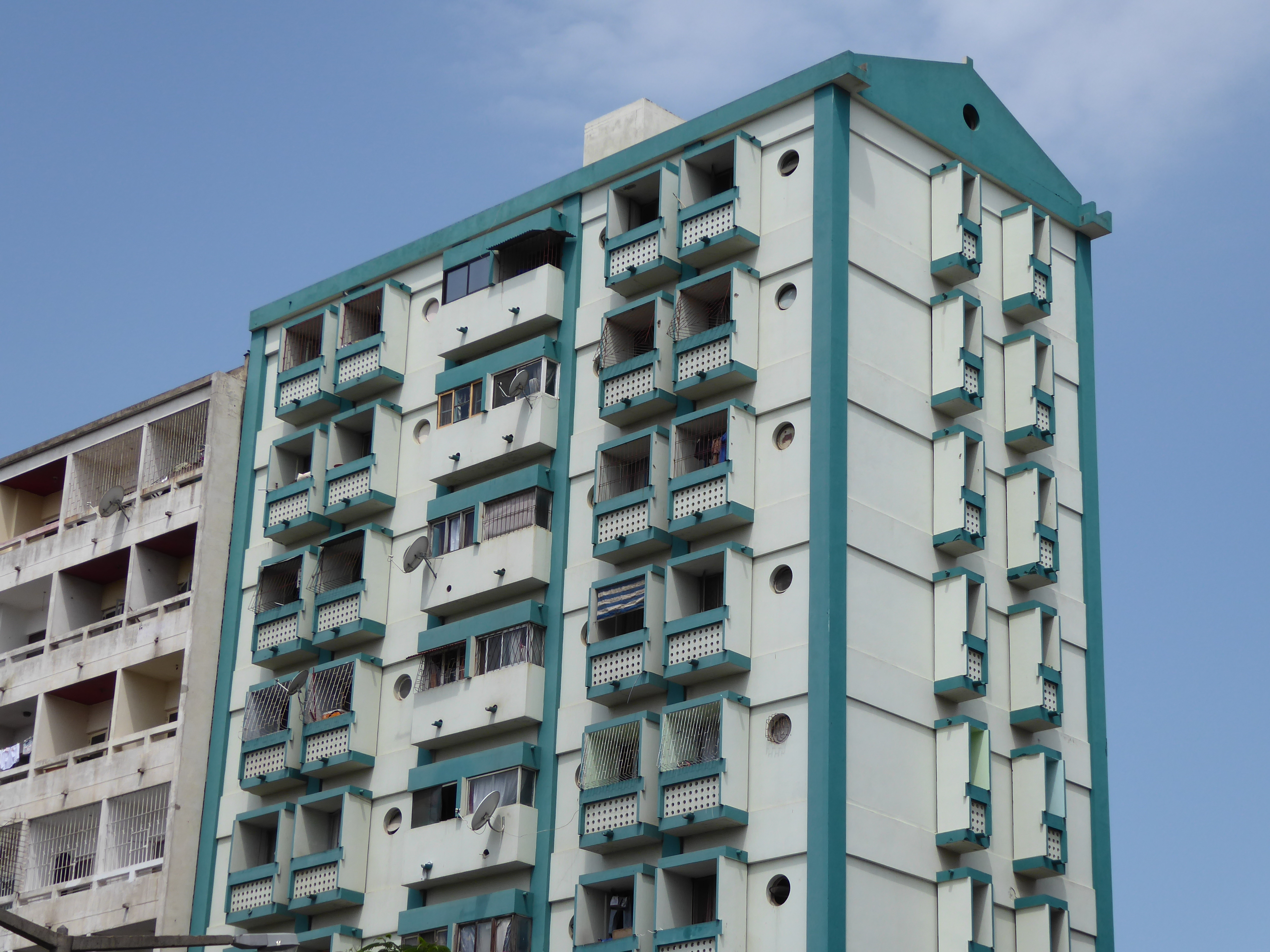
Officially titled 'Edifício do Banco das Poupanças das Viúvas e Orfãos da Polícia Maputo', this building is the Savings bank's living building for widows and orphans of the police in Maputo, Mozambique, from 1967

Amâncio d'Alpoim Miranda "Pancho" Guedes (Lisbon, Portugal, 13 May 1925 – Graaff-Reinet, South Africa, 7 November 2015) was a Portuguese architect, sculptor, painter, and educator.

He is described as one of the earliest post-modernist architects in Africa and an archetypal Eclectic Modernist.

== Early life ==
Guedes was born in Lisbon, Portugal, in 1925. He is a descendant of Portuguese nobleman Luis de Alpoim.

Guedes spent much of his life in Portuguese Mozambique from the age of 7 years old and he would stay there for most of his life.

Wanting to become an artist, he enrolled at the University of Witwatersrand in Johannesburg in 1945. He soon decided to study architecture which was to him the culmination and combination of all the artistic trades that interested him.

== Architecture career ==
Guedes then began his career and produced a multitude of projects in the 1950s and 60s as building activity intensified in Mozambique. His creations mix the sculptural and figurative with practical requirements and traditional local identity.

In East Africa he produced the designs for hundreds of buildings, many of them in the city of Lourenço Marques (Maputo) but also in Angola, in South Africa, and in Portugal. He worked pro-bono with founder Michael Stern to design the campus for the first multi-racial school in Southern Africa, the Waterford Kamhlaba United World College of Southern Africa in Eswatini.

Guedes was part of “Team 10”, a group of architects who assembled in July 1953 at the 9th Congress of CIAM and adopted a new approach to urbanism through impactful theoretical frameworks which influenced the development of European architectural thought during the late 20th century.

Arguably, one of Guedes' most famous buildings is the Smiling Lion Building from 1956 built in Mozambique. Guedes calls the style of this building STILOGUEDES which translates loosely as 'Style of Guedes'. The high level mural on the West façade is still intact and so is the "smiling lion" on the North corner. The lion is a small concrete casting with a smile hence the name of the building.

== Architecture Projects ==
Pancho Guedes designed numerous buildings across Mozambique, South Africa, Zimbabwe, and Eswatini, often noted for their surrealist forms, playful ornamentation, and fusion of modernist and vernacular influences.

- Prometheus Apartments (Edifício Prometheus), 1951–1953, Maputo (then Lourenço Marques), Mozambique
- Smiling Lion Apartments (Leão Que Ri), 1956, Maputo, Mozambique
- Saipal Bakery, 1954, Maputo, Mozambique
- Dragon Building (Edifício Dragão), 1951–1953, Maputo, Mozambique
- Bay Window House, c.1985, Northcliff, Johannesburg, South Africa
- Service Station, 1961, Komatipoort, South Africa
- Church of Sagrada Família, 1964, Machava, Mozambique
- Church of St James the Great, 1965, Nyamandhlovo, Zimbabwe
- Waterford School, 1972, Mbabane, Eswatini
- Nurse’s Hostel, 1974, Chicumbane, Gaza, Mozambique

== Artistic career ==
Aside from his large-scale architectural projects, he was also a sculptor and painter.

Exhibitions of his visual art have taken place at the Berardo Collection Museum in Lisbon, among other venues.

Guedes bought works by Paul Klee in 1948, admiring his surrealist style and infantile themes. He made sculptures inspired by Paul Klee's Angels at the end of his career. One of his last sketches, made in 2015, was entitled 'A Tribute to Paul Klee'.

== Awards ==
Pancho Guedes received widespread recognition for his contribution to architecture, art, and education. His honours reflect both his influence within Southern Africa and his international reputation for pioneering a distinct architectural language that blended modernism with vernacular and surrealist forms. Notable awards and distinctions include:

- South African Institute of Architects Gold Medal for Architecture, 1979
- Comendador da Ordem Santiago e Espada,1979
- Seccao portguesa de criticos de Arte, 1996
- 8th Sophia Gray Memorial Lecture Laureate, 1996
- Honorary Doctorate by the University of Pretoria, 1998

== Political problems ==
After the events of the Carnation Revolution in Lisbon, he left newly independent Mozambique in 1974. Mozambique was officially established in 1975 as the People's Republic of Mozambique.

His rapid departure from Mozambique in 1974 along with other Portuguese subject to the 24/20 declaration (giving them 24 hours to leave and allowing them to take 20 kilograms of belongings) left his family almost penniless. Due to his reputation, he received an invitation to take the vacant chair of Architecture at the University of the Witwatersrand in Johannesburg.

== Death ==
Pancho Guedes died on 7 November 2015 at the age of 90.

== Works ==
- Church in Maputo (1962)
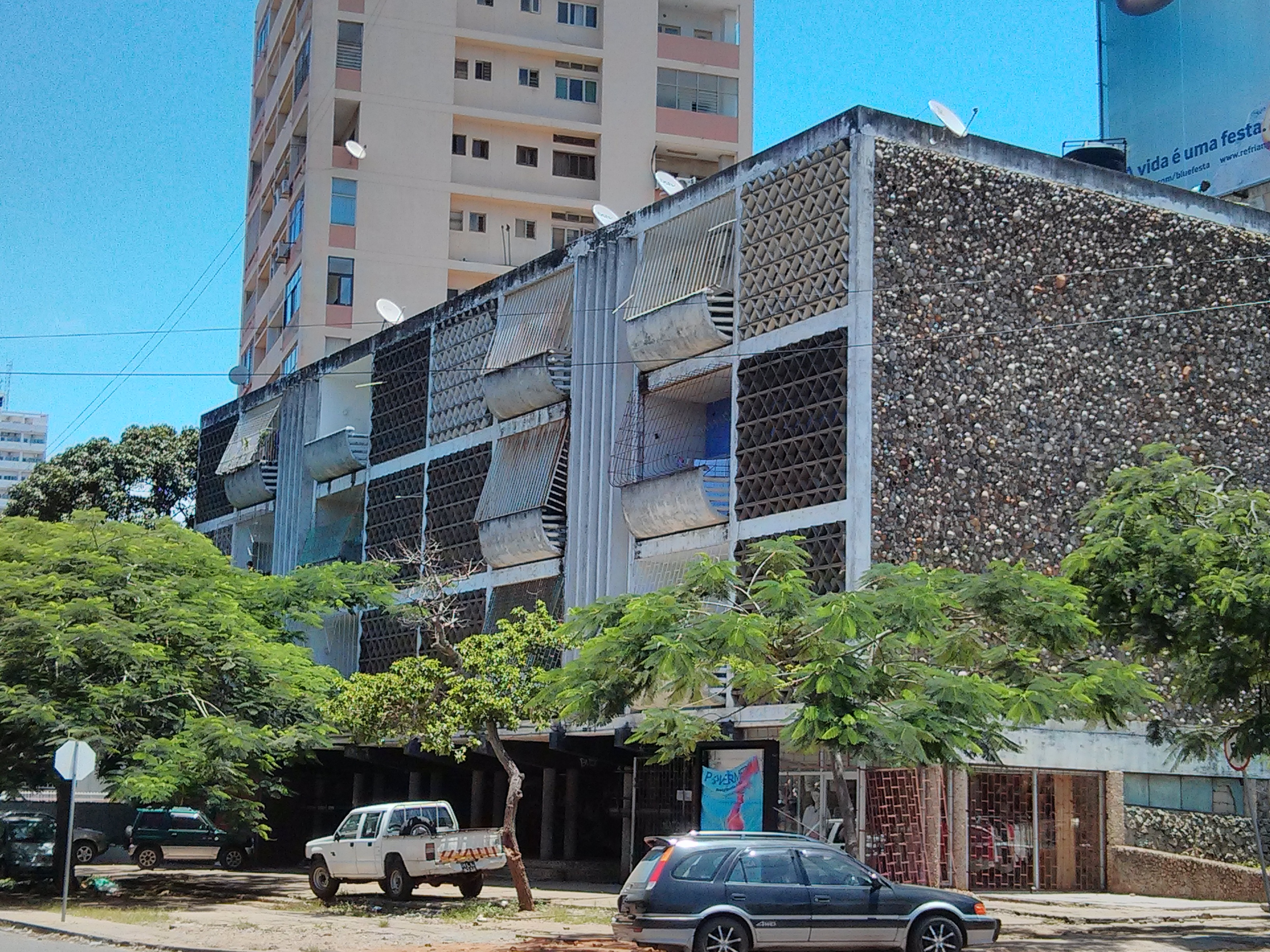
Edifício Dragão (1953), Maputo

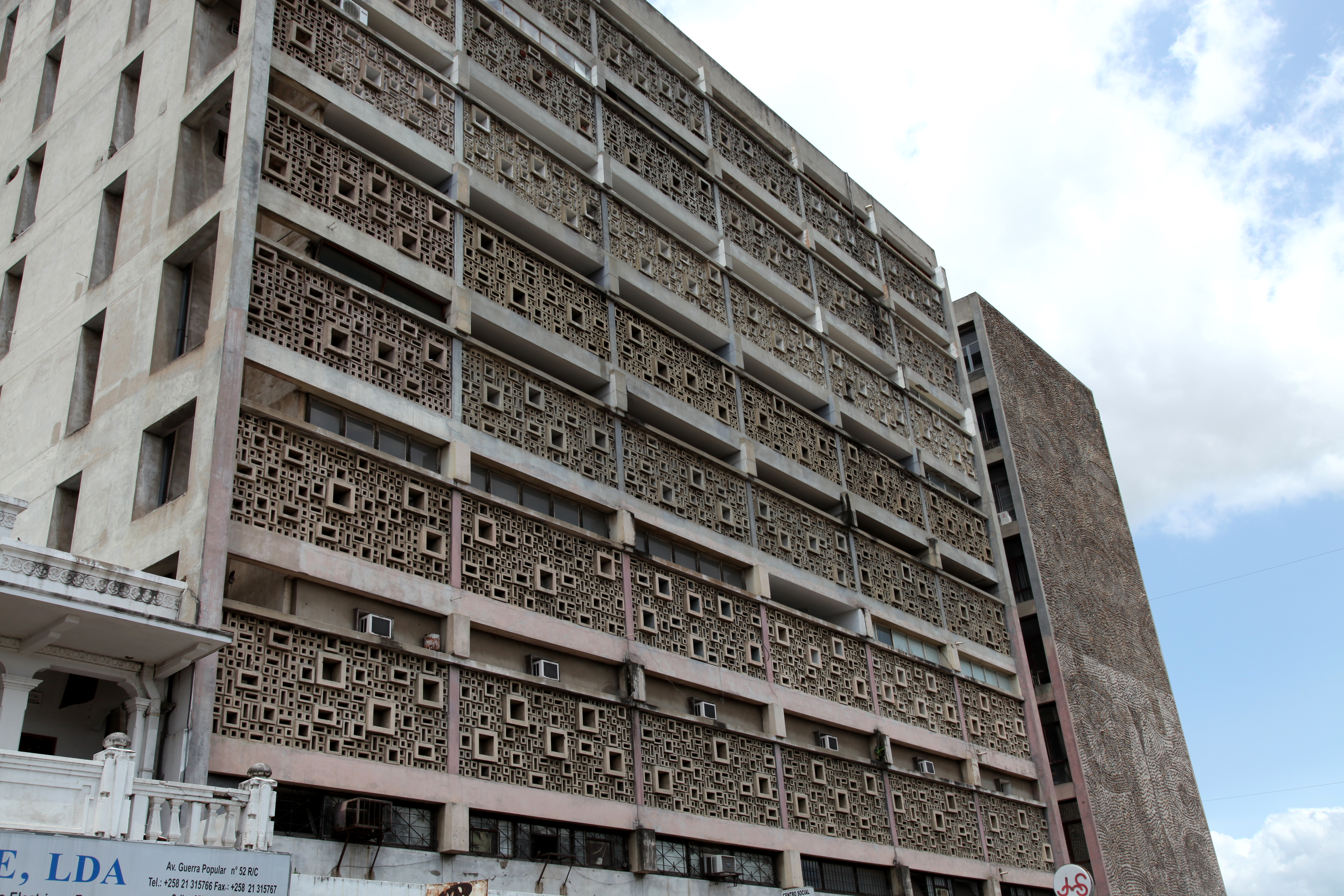
Prédio Abreu, Santos e Rocha (1953/56), Maputo

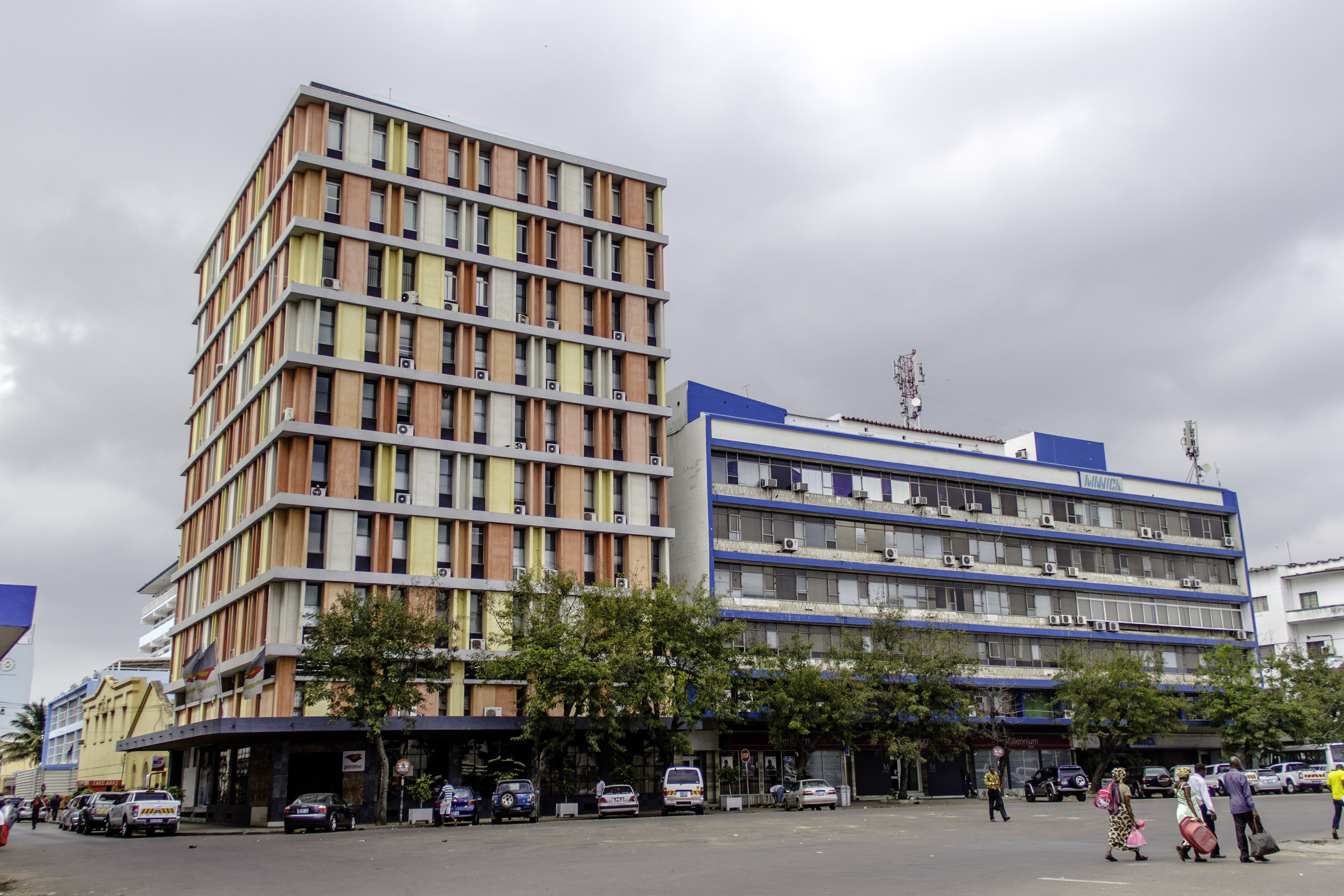
Prédio Spence e Lemos (1964), expanded 2008–2010
