= Prior of Crato =

Head of the Knights Hospitaller in Portugal

The Prior of Crato (Prior do Crato), was the traditional title given to the head of the Order of the Knights of St. John of Jerusalem (Hospitaller) in Portugal. It is a reference to the domains of the order around Crato, Portugal.

The Portuguese branch of the Knights Hospitaller was originally based in the northern citadel of Leça do Balio (near Matosinhos), which was allegedly donated to the order as early as 1112 by Countess Theresa. Around 1232, King Sancho II of Portugal donated extensive domains further south, around Crato (in the Portalegre District) to the Knights Hospitaller, along with the duty to fortify that frontier. The order moved its headquarters from Leça to Crato in 1340, shortly after the Battle of Salado, constructing the Monastery of Flor da Rosa near Crato.

From the outset in the 12th century, the head of the Order of Knights Hospitaller in Portugal was known simply as the Prior do Hospital. That title continued to be used after the move to Crato. It is really only after 1441 that the term Prior do Crato began being commonly used.

The most famous person to hold this position was probably António, Prior of Crato, a royal prince who attempted to lay claim on the royal throne (as King Anthony I of Portugal) during the 1580 dynastic crisis. Anthony ended up losing his bid to King Philip II of Spain.

At the time of the Restoration of the Portuguese monarchy in 1640, the new king John IV of Portugal nominated D. Rodrigo da Cunha to the position, but the order refused to ratify the king's choice, noting that the title was currently held by a Spanish Infante. For the next few decades, the king and the order continued at odds, the order forwarding its own candidates against the king's choices. No one held the formal title of prior, the king being limited to appointing an administrator or governor for the order. A compromise was finally reached during the regency of Peter II, whereby the king agreed to recognize the candidate nominated by the order, and in return, the king would get to nominate his three subsequent successors.

The title of grão-prior (Grand Prior of Crato) was subsequently dominated by royal princes (infantes), before ascending to the throne. This was formalized in a royal letter of Queen Mary I of Portugal in 1789 (confirmed by Pope Pius VI), passing the properties of the order to the Casa do Infantado - that is, permanently placing the administration of the order in the hands of the legitimate heir to the throne. This arrangement continued until 1834, when the commenda of the Order of Knights Hospitaller in Portugal was extinguished, and their properties passed to the Junta dos Juros.

== Priors of Crato ==
Heads of the Knights Hospitaller in Portugal.

- c. 1157 - D. Frey Aires
- 1232 - Mem Gonçalves
- D. Gonçalo Pereira, Bishop of Lisbon and Archbishop of Braga (father of Álvaro Gonçalves Pereira)
- 1235? - Rodrigo Gil
- 1335 - ? - Álvaro Gonçalves Pereira (father of Nuno Álvares Pereira), the first Prior of Crato
- 1384? - D. Pedro Álvares Pereira (elder brother of Nuno Álvares Pereira)
- 1430? - D. Frei Nuno de Góis
- Álvaro Gonçalves Camelo
- Afonso Pais
- João de Ataíde (1448 - 1453) (son of D. Álvaro Gonçalves de Ataíde, 1st Count of Atouguia)
- Vasco de Ataíde (1453 to 1492?) (son of D. Álvaro Gonçalves de Ataíde, 1st Count of Atouguia)
- Vasco Martins de Gomide ?
- 6th 1490s - Diogo Fernandes de Almeida (son of Lopo de Almeida, Count of Abrantes).
- 1508-1522 - D. Joao de Meneses, 1st Count of Tarouca
- João Coelho
- 1527-1555 - Infante Louis, Duke of Beja (second son of King Manuel I of Portugal)
- D. João de Menezes
- António, Prior of Crato (son of Louis of Beja and pretender to the Portuguese throne during the 1580 dynastic crisis).
- 1581-1598 Archduke Albert of Austria (administrator)
- 1598-1604 Infante Victor Amadeus of Savoy
- Manuel de Melo
- ? - 1742 - Infante Francis, Duke of Beja (son of Peter II of Portugal) (grão-prior)
- ? - 1786 - Peter III of Portugal (grão-prior)
- ? - ? - John VI of Portugal (grão-prior)
- ?-? - Pedro I of Brazil (grão-prior)
- 1828-1834 - Miguel I of Portugal (grão-prior)
- 1846-1857 - Guilherme Henriques de Carvalho, Patriarch of Lisbon (grão-prior)

== Sources ==
- "Ordem de Malta ou de S. João de Jerusalem em Portugal", January 1839, O Panorama: Jornal litterario e instructivo
