= Pedro Vaz =

Pedro Vaz may refer to:

- Pedro Vaz, Cape Verde, a settlement in Cape Verde
- Pedro Vaz Marinheiro, Portuguese nobleman and colonizer of the Azores Islands
- Pedro Vaz (diplomat) (1963–2012), Uruguayan diplomat
- Pedro Vaz (Portuguese politician) (born 1979), Portuguese politician and member of the Assembly of the Republic
