= Castilian War (disambiguation) =

The Castilian War, or Spanish Expedition to Borneo, was a 1578 conflict between the Spanish Empire and the Bruneian Empire.

Castilian War may also refer to:

- Castilian war of succession (1282–1304) between Sancho IV of Castile and the Infantes de la Cerda
- Castilian Civil War of 1351–1369 between Peter of Castile and Henry II of Castile
  - War of the Two Peters (1356–1375) between Peter of Castile and Peter IV of Aragon
- War of the Castilian Succession (1475–1479) between Isabella I of Castile and Joanna la Beltraneja
- Revolt of the Comuneros, or Castilian War of the Communities (1520–1) between Castilian Comuneros rebels and Castilian Royalists

== See also ==
- Castilian Civil War
