= Nuno Pereira de Lacerda =

Portuguese nobleman

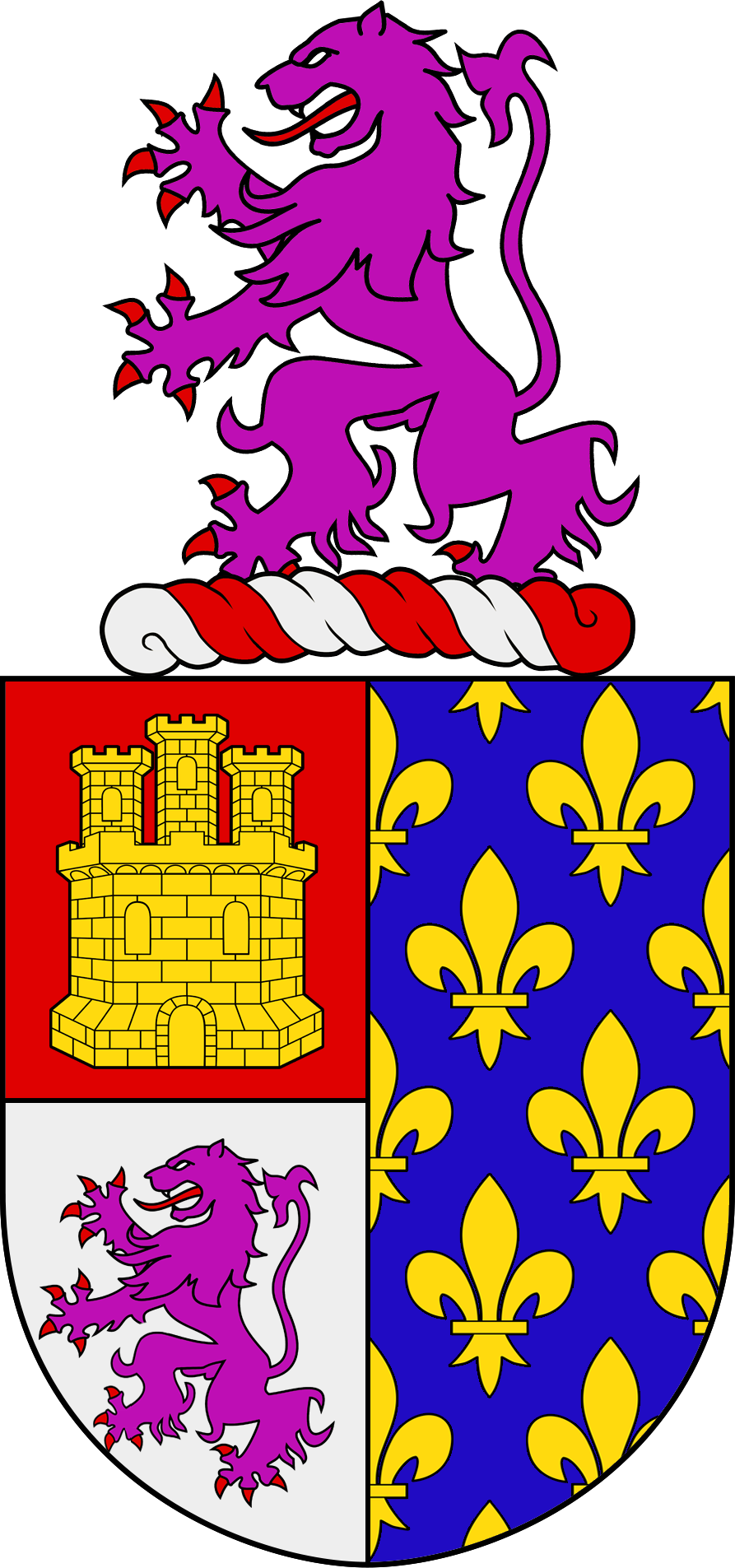
- Coat of Arms of Lacerda
- Born: 1425; Portugal
- Died: 10 May 1509 (aged 83–84); Portugal
- Noble family: House of la Cerda

Nuno Pereira de Lacerda (1425–1509) was a Portuguese nobleman, who served as Alcaide of Portel Fronteira and Vidigueira. He was vassal of the King John I of Portugal.

== Biography ==
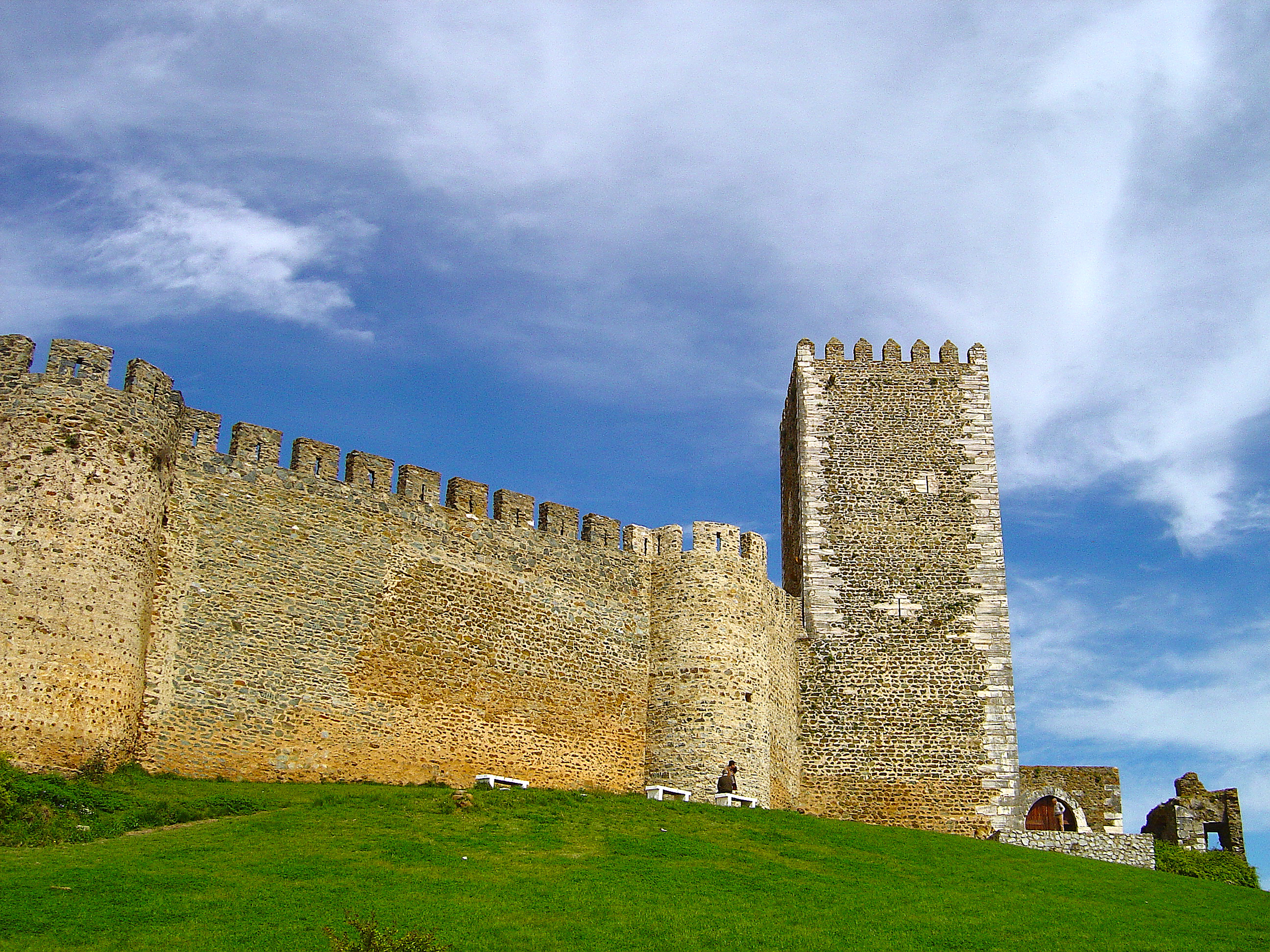
Portel Castle

Nuno was born in the Iberian Peninsula, the son of Diogo Nunes Pereira de Lacerda, Lord of Sardoal, and Brites Rodrigues de Abreu, daughter of John Falconet and Maria da Silva, belonging to an Anglo Portuguese family. His paternal grandparents were Martim Gonçalves de Lacerda and Violante Pereira, a noble lady who was the daughter of Álvaro Gonçalves Pereira.

Around the year 1455, he and his family lived in the village of Serpa. In 1483, he received from the hands of the King John II of Portugal, the rights over the localities of Portel, Vidigueira and Vila do Conde.

Nuno Pereira de Lacerda was married to Guiomar de Brito, daughter of Manuel de Brito, Captain of Chaul, and his wife Francisca Cardoso.
