= Juan Báez de Alpoim =

Spanish army officer and politician

Captain Juan Báez de Alpoim

Vice-Mayor of Buenos Aires
- In office 1667–1668
- Monarch: Charles II of Spain
- Preceded by: Ignacio Fernández de Agüero
- Succeeded by: Félix Astudillo

Procurador General of Buenos Aires
- In office 1668–1669
- Monarch: Charles II of Spain
- Preceded by: ?
- Succeeded by: ?

Personal details
- Born: 1643 Buenos Aires, Viceroyalty of Peru
- Died: 1717 (aged 73–74) Buenos Aires, Viceroyalty of Peru
- Resting place: Catedral de Buenos Aires
- Spouse(s): Ana Hurtado de Mendoza; Sabina Jacinta de Lavayén
- Occupation: politician army merchant
- Profession: Army officer
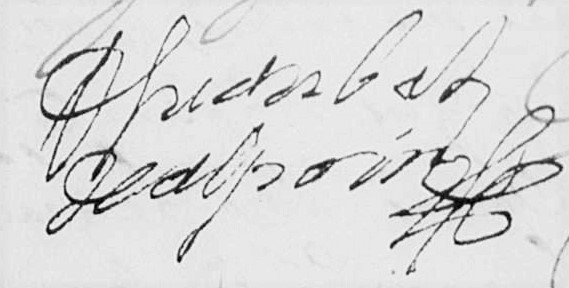
- Signature

Military service
- Allegiance: Spanish Empire
- Branch/service: Spanish Army
- Years of service: c.1660-c.1700
- Rank: Captain
- Unit: Fuerte de Buenos Aires

Juan Báez de Alpoim (1643–1716) was a Spanish army officer and politician. He held various government positions during the Viceroyalty of Peru, serving as alcalde and regidor of Buenos Aires.

== Biography ==
He was born in Buenos Aires, the son of Amador Báez de Alpoim and Ana Romero de Santa Cruz, belonging to a distinguished family of Portuguese descent. He was elected alcalde of second vote of Buenos Aires in 1667, and served as Prosecutor General of Buenos Aires in 1668. For several periods he was chosen as Alférez real, in charge of carrying the Royal Standard during official ceremonies.

He also had an outstanding performance at the head of the Provincial Militias of Buenos Aires. In 1700, he was appointed by the Governor of Buenos Aires Don Agustín de Robles, to occupy the position of Captain of the Cavalry of the Real Fortaleza de San Juan Baltasar de Austria, in replacement of Miguel de Riglos Bástida.

In 1702 by a Royal Provision issued in Barcelona on April 22 of that year, Alpoin was granted the title of Captain of the Caballería of the Fort of Buenos Aires. That same year he was replaced by the Captain Manuel del Barranco y Zapiain.

In addition to occupying various positions in government, he dedicated himself to agriculture and livestock (cattle cimmaron). He was a powerful landowner, his farm had more than a thousand head of cattle. In 1701 the City Council authorized him to make the supply of meat in the city of Buenos Aires.

Juan Báez de Alpoim was the owner of the first Luxury Carriages of Buenos Aires, introduced in the city towards the end of the 17th century.

== Family ==
Juan Báez de Alpoim was married twice, first to Ana Hurtado de Mendoza, daughter of Pedro Hurtado de Mendoza and Juana Olguín de Ulloa Melo. And second with Sabina Jacinta de Lavayén, daughter of Agustín de Lavayén Hormaechea, born in San Sebastián and Juana de Tapia Vargas Cervantes Rangel, born in the city and daughter of a Spanish family.

His first wife was a descendant of Pedro Álvarez Holguín de Ulloa and Vasco Fernandes Coutinho, conquerors of Spanish and Portuguese origin.

Through his paternal grandmother Margarita Cabral de Melo, he was descendant of Peter I of Portugal and Inês de Castro, great-granddaughter of Fernán Gutiérrez de Castro and Mélia Iñiguez de Mendoza.
