= Marquess of Cañada Honda =

Marquessate of Cañada Honda
- Creation date: 20 March 1893
- Created by: Maria Christina of Austria
- Peerage: Peerage of Spain
- First holder: Emilio Drake y de la Cerda, 1st Marquess of Cañada Honda
- Present holder: Francisco de Paula Alfaro y Drake, 4th Marquess of Cañada Honda

Marquess of Cañada Honda (Spanish: Marqués de Cañada Honda) is a noble title in the peerage of Spain, bestoweded on Emilio Drake, by the Queen Regent Maria Christina of Austria on 20 March 1893. The title refers to the volcanic area of Cañada Honda, in the province of Almería. Emilio Drake was son of the 1st Count of Vega Mar and the 7th Marchioness of Eguaras.

== Marquesses of Cañada Honda (1893) ==
- Emilio Drake y de la Cerda, 1st Marquess of Cañada Honda (1855–1915)
- Francisco de Paula Drake y Fernández-Durán, 2nd Marquess of Cañada Honda (1880–1936), son of the 1st Marquess
- María de la Asunción Drake y Santiago, 3rd Marchioness of Cañada Honda (1906–1977), daughter of the 2nd Marquess
- Francisco de Paula Alfaro y Drake, 4th Marquess of Cañada Honda (b. 1940), son of the 3rd Marchioness

== See also ==
- House of la Cerda

== Bibliography ==
- Hidalgos de España, Real Asociación de (2018). Elenco de Grandezas y Títulos Nobiliarios Españoles. Ediciones Hidalguía. ISBN 978-84-94841-02-6.
