= Lacerda =

Lacerda is a Portuguese language surname branched from the castilan House of la Cerda. Notable persons with that name include:

- Alberto de Lacerda (1928–2007), Portuguese poet and radio presenter
- Carlos Lacerda (1914–1977), Brazilian journalist and politician
- Daniel Lacerda (born 1975), Canadian author
- Edmar Lacerda da Silva (born 1982), Brazilian football striker
- Edmar Halovskyi de Lacerda, Ukrainian-Brazilian footballer
- Francisco de Lacerda (died 1798), Portuguese explorer
- Genival Lacerda (1931–2021), Brazilian singer
- João Baptista de Lacerda (1846–1915), Brazilian physician and biomedical scientist
- Leonardo Renan Simões de Lacerda (born 1988), Brazilian football central defender
- Marcio Lacerda (born 1946), Brazilian politician
- Maria Lacerda de Moura (1887–1945), Brazilian teacher, journalist, feminist, and anarchist
- Osvaldo Lacerda (1927–2011), Brazilian composer
- Rui Lacerda (born 1991), Portuguese marathon canoeist
- Thiago Lacerda (born 1978), Brazilian actor

== History of surname ==
As stated above, Afonso Fernando de la Cerda came to live in Serpa, Portugal in the time of king D. Fernando, here marrying to Violante Pereira, and from this union comes the portuguese branch.

== See also ==
- Rodrigo Lacerda Ramos (born 1980), Brazilian footballer
- Pontes e Lacerda, a municipality in the Brazilian state of Mato Grosso
