= Mendo de Alpoim =

Portuguese nobleman, chancellor, ambassador, and member of the court of John I of Portugal

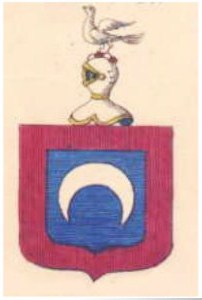
- Coat of Arms of Alpuims

Personal details
- Born: 14th century Coimbra, Kingdom of Portugal
- Died: 15th century Portugal
- Occupation: Diplomat

Mendo de Alpoim (c.1360-14?) was a Portuguese nobleman, chancellor and ambassador, member of the court of John I of Portugal. He served in diplomatic missions in the Kingdom of England.

== Biography ==
Mendo de Alpoim possibly born in Coimbra, son of Gomes de Alpoim and Elvira Guterres. He was married to Guiomar de Vera, daughter of Alvaro de Vera, alcaide-mór of Évora. Alpoim was the father of Lopo de Alpoim, alcaide of Montemor-o-Velho. And grandson of Diniz d' Alpoim, Lord of Esgueira.

In 1386, he was commissioned carry out the preparations concerning the wedding of King John I with Philippa of Lancaster.
