= Álvaro Pires Pinheiro Lobo =

Personal details
- Born: c.1460 Portugal
- Died: 1511 Barcelos, Portugal
- Occupation: Alcaide

Álvaro Pires Pinheiro Lobo (c.1460-1511) was a Portuguese nobleman, who served as Alcaide-mór of Barcelos. He had served as a vassal of Fernando I, Duke of Braganza.

== Biography ==
Álvaro was born in Portugal, son of Pedro Esteves and Isabel Pinheiro. His father had been an important member of the court of Braganza, and a descendant of Rodrigo Anes de Penela, Lord of Penela.

He was married to Joana Lacerda, a noble Lady who served to Isabella of Portugal. She was daughter of Nuno Pereira de Lacerda (descendant of Fernando de Lacerda) and Guiomar de Brito.

Álvaro Pires Pinheiro Lobo served as Administrator of Morgado de Pouve, and Nobleman of the house of the Duke of Braganza, Dom Fernando I.
