= Diniz d' Alpoim =

Portuguese nobleman (born c. 1300)

- Lord
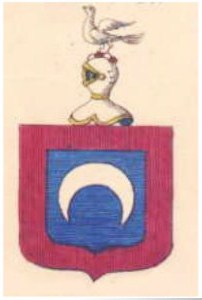
- Coat of Arms of Alpoim
- Born: 14th Century; Coimbra, Portugal
- Died: 14th Century; Coimbra, Portugal
- Buried: Mosteiro de São Jorge de Coimbra
- Noble family: Alpuins
- Father: Luis de Alpoim
- Mother: Dominga Cabral.

Diniz d' Alpoim (c.1300–?) was a Portuguese nobleman, Lord of Esgueira, He served as ambassador to Aragon in times of Afonso IV.

== Biography ==
Alpoim was born in the Kingdom of Portugal, son of Luis de Alpoim, ambassador in the Holy Roman Empire and England. He was married to Elvira or Genebra Lopes, daughter of a noble family from the region of the Guarda.

Diniz d' Alpoim is buried in the monastery São Jorge, in the vicinity of Coimbra.
