= Emilio Drake, 1st Marquess of Cañada Honda =

The Most Excellent The Marquess of Cañada Honda

Senator of Puerto Rico
- In office 1891-1893
- Monarchs: Maria Christina of Austria, Queen Regent

Member of the Congress of Deputies
- In office 1898-1899 1902 1907-1908
- Monarch: Alfonso XIII of Spain
- Constituency: Segovia

Personal details
- Born: 27 January 1855
- Died: 2 July 1915 (aged 60)
- Party: Liberal-Fusionist Party (1891)
- Other political affiliations: Independent (1891-1908)
- Spouse: Maria Asunción Fernández-Durán y Bernaldo de Quirós
- Parent(s): Carlos Drake y Núñez del Castillo, 1st Count of Vegamar, Viscount of Escambray Virginia De la Cerda y Gand-Villain, 7th Marchioness of Eguaras

Emilio María Juan Crisostomo Drake y de la Cerda, 1st Marquess of Cañada Honda (27 January 1855 – 2 July 1915), was a Spanish aristocrat and politician, member of the Congress of Deputies as well as senator for the province of Puerto Rico, a Spanish colony at the time. Closely linked to the Liberal Party, Drake became senator in 1891 and deputy in 1898, being an active member of the Senate's and the Congress' committees regarding public works and infrastructure in Puerto Rico and Peninsular Spain. He was awarded the Grand Cross of the Order of Isabella the Catholic and made Maestrante of Seville.

== Background and family (1855-1893) ==
Emilio was born in January 1855 into a wealthy aristocratic family. His father, Carlos Guillermo Drake y Núñez del Castillo, member of the Spanish nobility as Count of Vega Mar and Viscount of Escambray, was the son of a wealthy Englishman, James Ash Drake, who had made his fortune on the Spanish island colony of Cuba in the late eighteenth century. His mother, Carlota, was part of the island's aristocracy (her father was the Marquess of San Felipe y Santiago and later Count of Castillo, Grandee of Spain). In the early 1800s, after the independence of Spanish American possessions, the family emigrated to the Peninsula and settled in Madrid. Carlos married Virginia De la Cerda y Gand-Villain-Rochefoucauld de Bayers, member of the House of De La Cerda, one of Spain's most important noble houses. Virginia was the daughter of José Máximo De La Cerda y Palafox, 6th Count of Parcent, 6th Marquess of Bárboles (, ), cousin to Empress Eugenia of France, and of Marie de Gand-Vilain de La Rochefoucauld-Bayers, Marquise de Bayers, Comtesse du Saint-Empire, a Franco-Spanish aristocrat, granddaughter of the last Prince de la Rochefoucauld-Bayers.

Virginia married Carlos Drake in 1847, the year he was made a count and gentilhombre to Queen Isabella II.

Upon her father's death in 1851, Virginia became 7th Marchioness of Eguaras and was admitted into the Royal Order of Queen Maria Luisa.

The couple had several children:

- Carlos Drake y De la Cerda, 2nd Count of Vega Mar and 8th Marquess of Eguaras
- Luis Drake y De la Cerda, married to the daughter of the Counts of Maluque
- Emilio Drake y De la Cerda, 1st Marquess of Cañada Honda
- Rosalía Drake y De la Cerda, who married her cousin José Luis De la Cerda, 9th Count of Villar.

The Count of Vega Mar died in 1880. Virginia, the dowager countess died in 1909 getting to meet her grand-granddaughter Maria (later 3rd Marchioness of Cañada Honda).

== Marriage and children ==
Emilio Drake married Maria Asunción Fernández-Durán y Bernaldo de Quirós in 1879. The young bride was another member of a prominent aristocratic family: her father was Manuel Fernández-Durán y Pando, 5th Marquess of Perales del Río (G.d.E) and 4th Marquess of Tolosa. The couple had ten children, among them:

- Francisco de Paula Drake y Fernández-Durán (1880-1936), 2nd Marquess of Cañada Honda, who married Luisa de Santiago Lacave, daughter of General Luis Santiago, Minister of War. He was murdered by communists during the Spanish Civil War
- Antonia Drake y Fernández-Durán (1888-1868) who married her cousin, Emilio Drake y Redondo, 10th Marquess of Eguaras.

The couple made an acquaintance with Queen Regent Maria Christina and prominent of members of the Liberal Party, such as Antonio Maura (who later became a Conservative). In March 1893, in the context of "caciquismo", electoral strategy based on landlords putting pressure on peasants, Emilio Drake was granted the peerage of Marquess of Cañada Honda in exchange for "whipping" the votes of Segovia, his province, for the Liberal Party. Furthermore, Emilio was the youngest of his family and didn't get to inherit any of his family's grand titles hence why the queen regent created the peerage for him.

== Death ==
Emilio Drake was last elected deputy in 1907 and left his seat in the Chamber of Deputies in 1908. He retired to his estate in La Cervanta, Toledo, the following year. He died in July 1915. His son, Francisco, became the 2nd Marquess of Cañada Honda.

=== Styles ===
27 January 1855 - 12 April 1891: The Most Illustrious, Don Emilio Drake y De La Cerda

12 April 1891 - 20 March 1893: The Most Illustrious, Don Emilio Drake y De La Cerda, Senator for Puerto Rico

20 March 1893 - 2 July 1915: The Most Excellent The Marquess of Cañada Honda, Knight Grand Cross of the Order of Isabella the Catholic, Maestrante of La Real de Sevilla

1898-1908: The Most Excellent The Marquess of Cañada Honda, Knight Grand Cross of the Order of Isabella the Catholic, Maestrante of La Real de Sevilla, Deputy to the Cortes Generales.

== See also ==
- Marquess of Cañada Honda
