= Monastery of Flor da Rosa =

Building in Crato, Portalegre District, Portugal

Flor da Rosa Monastery
- Mosteiro de Flor da Rosa (Portuguese)
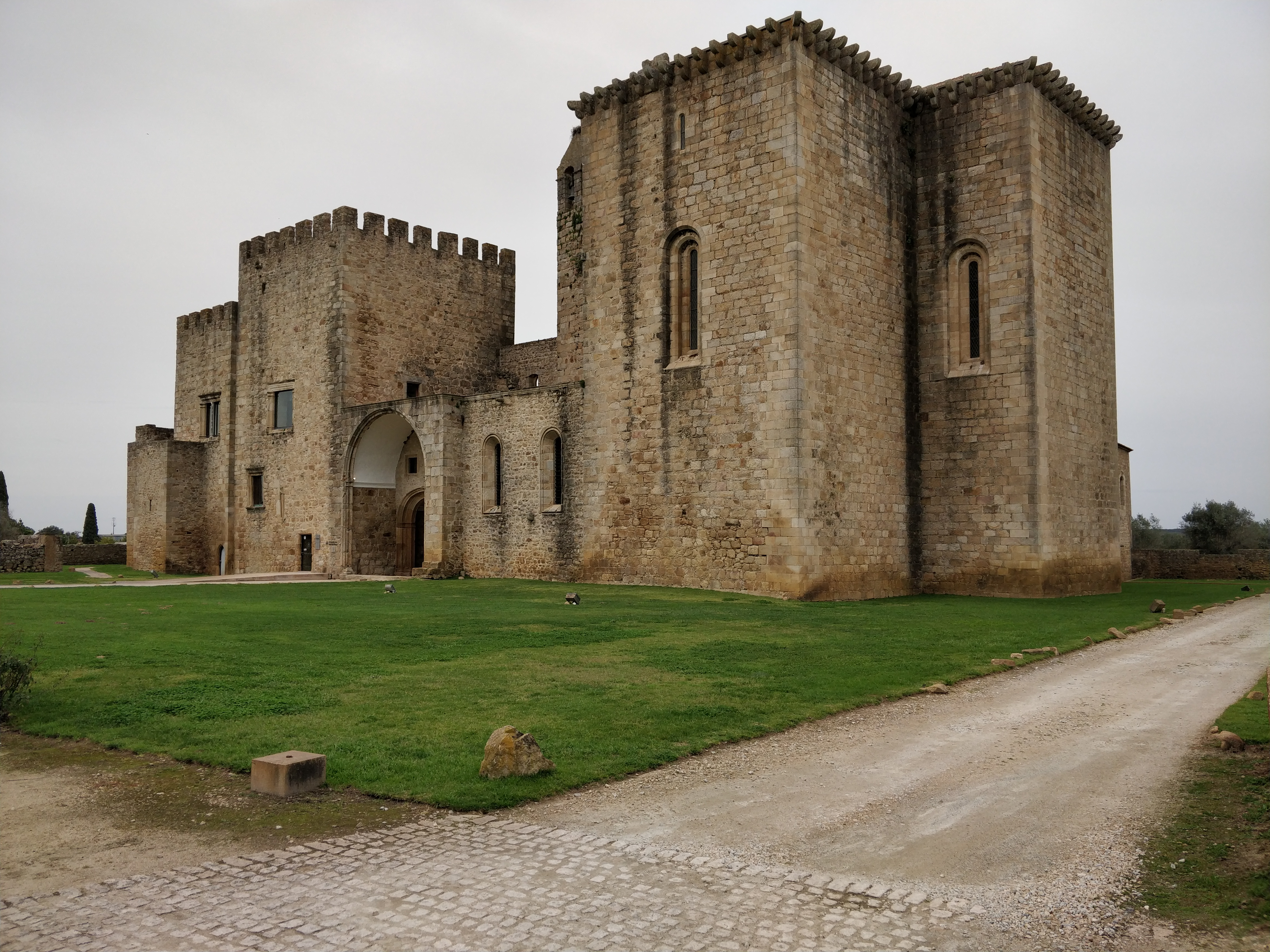
- Exterior view of the Monastery
- Interactive map of Flor da Rosa Monastery
- 39°18′24″N 7°38′53″W
- Location: Flor da Rosa, Crato, Portugal

History
- Built: 1340–1356

Site notes
- Architectural styles: Gothic, Manueline, Mudéjar, Renaissance

The Monastery of Flor da Rosa is situated in Flor da Rosa in the municipality of Crato in the Portalegre District of Portugal. Constructed by the Knights Hospitaller, it is considered both as one of the most important Gothic monuments in Portugal and as the best Portuguese example of a fortress church.

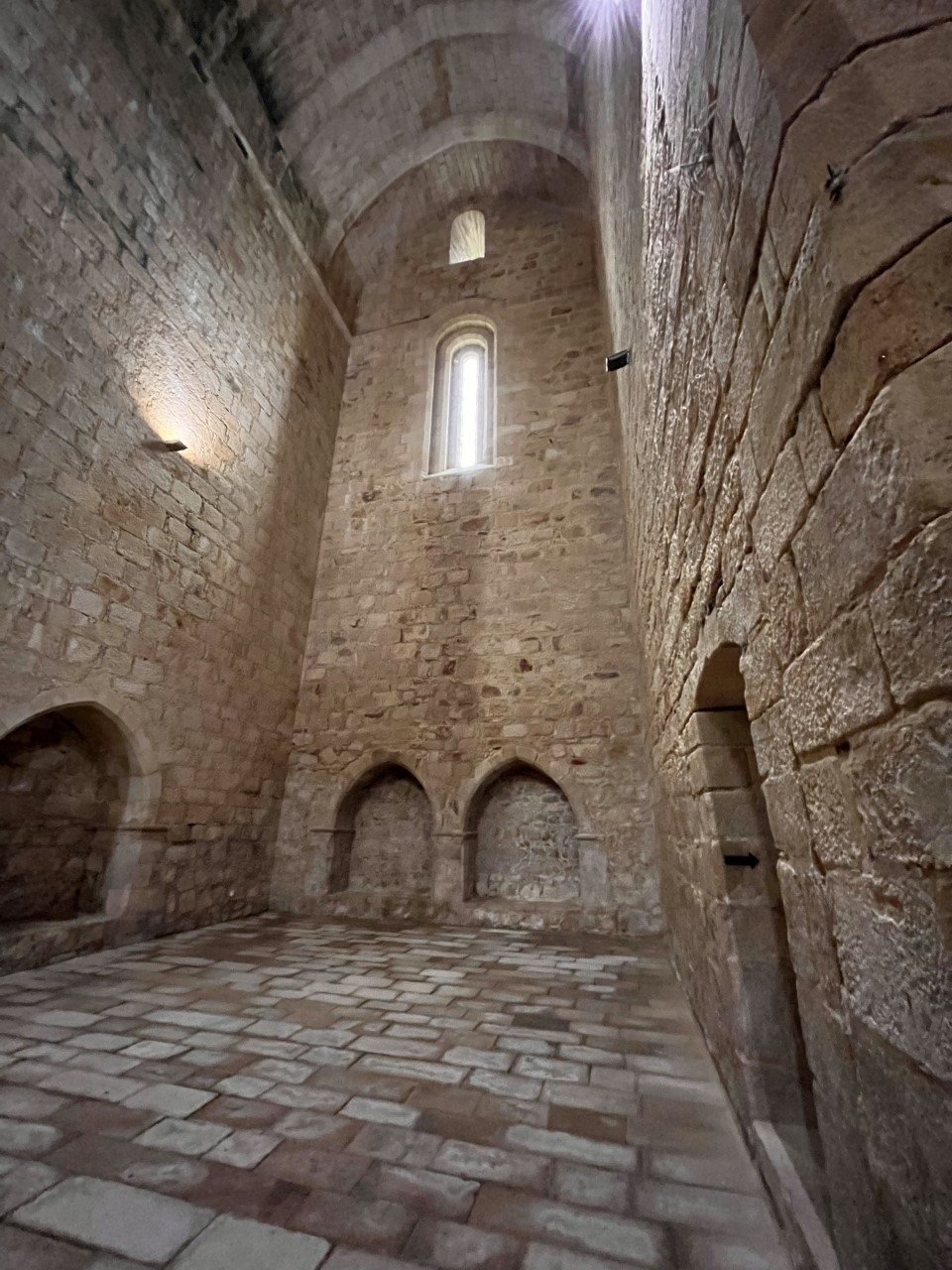
Interior of the church

== History ==
In 1232 King Sancho II donated the town of Crato to the Hospitallers Order. Building of the monastery began around 1340, when the headquarters of the Order of Knights of the Hospital of Saint John of Jerusalem were moved from Leça do Balio near Porto to Crato. A century later, the head of the order began to be known as the Prior of Crato. The monastery was made up of three different buildings, a Gothic-style fortress church, a Gothic castle-like palace, and accommodation for the monks. The entire complex has been much altered over time, particularly in the 16th, 17th and 20th centuries.

Construction initially took advantage of the facilities of a previous monastery on the site. The church, considered the most important part of the complex, occupies the eastern half of the monument. It is arranged at right angles to the main façade and is accessed through an atrium. The church is notable for its height in relation to its narrow nave and wide transept and for the almost-total absence of interior decoration. At the entrance to the church is the tomb of the founder, D. Frei Álvaro Gonçalves Pereira. The exterior of the complex has high crenelated towers, and was clearly built as a fortress.

The cloister was substantially rebuilt in the 16th century. At the same time, much other work was carried out on the complex, introducing Manueline, Mudéjar and Renaissance architectural styles. However, by 1615 the area was ruined and underwent further restoration. In 1897 parts of the church collapsed following a devastating storm, partly as a result of damaged previously suffered during the 1755 Lisbon earthquake. Full restoration was carried out between the 1940s and 1960s. The complex acquired its present form in the 1990s when parts were transformed into a hotel of the Pousadas de Portugal chain. The monastery was classified as a National Monument in 1910.
