= João de Alpoim =

Portuguese nobleman

- Rico-Homen
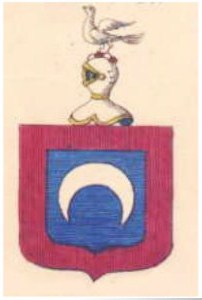
- Coat of Arms of Alpoim
- Born: 14th-century Kingdom of Portugal
- Died: 15th-century Kingdom of Portugal
- Noble family: Alpuims
- Father: Álvaro de Alpõe
- Mother: Teresa Rodrigues
- Occupation: Ambassador

João de Alpoim (born-14th-century) was a Portuguese nobleman. He served as ambassador of Portugal in Castile.

== Biography ==
Alpoim was born in Portugal, son of Alvaro de Alpoim, and descendant of Luis de Alpoim, ambassador to England. He was married to Catarina Perestrello, daughter of a noble family.

João de Alpoim was sent by John I of Portugal, on a diplomatic mission to demand from King Henry III of Castile, that he fulfill the provisions of the treaty of May 15, 1393.
