= 2,100 Asanas =

2015 book by Mr. Yoga

2,100 Asanas: The Complete Yoga Poses
- Author: Mr. Yoga
- Language: English
- Genre: Non-fiction
- Publisher: Hachette Book Group, Black Dog & Leventhal Publishers
- Publication date: November 10, 2015
- Media type: Print
- Pages: 736
- ISBN: 978-1631910104

2,100 Asanas: The Complete Yoga Positions is a 2015 non-fiction book written by Daniel Lacerda, also known as Mr. Yoga.

== Contents ==
2,100 Asanas: The Complete Yoga Positions features 2,100 yoga poses, photographed in color by Lacerda. The models in the book are all yoga students of Lacerda.

== Reception ==
Yoga Journal reviewed the book. It reported Lacerda as saying that he had catalogued 8.4 million yoga poses mentioned in Hatha Yoga Pradipika, and that they had been revealed to him in a dream. He stated that 2,100 Asanas was the first edition, and that he was working on a second edition, to be called 50,000 Asanas. The article noted that Dharma Mittra's 1984 chart of 908 Asanas had, until Lacerda's book, been the measure of all the yoga poses that existed.

The Washington Post calls it a "glossy, handsome coffee-table book", and so large as to be "either inspiring or totally daunting". It writes that the asanas range from "extremely simple" to "complicated and extreme" with lengthy names in English and Sanskrit.

2,100 Asanas appeared in the health and fitness bestseller lists of the Toronto Star, the American Booksellers Association, and The New York Times, all in December 2015.
