= Diego Rodríguez Valdez y de la Banda =

Spanish marine and politician

Governor of the Río de la Plata
- In office 1599–1600
- Monarch: Philip II of Spain
- Preceded by: Hernando Arias de Saavedra
- Succeeded by: Francés de Beaumont y Navarra

Personal details
- Born: 1557 Salamanca, Spain
- Died: 1600 (aged 42–43) Santa Fe, Argentina
- Spouse: María de Bracamonte y Anaya.
- Occupation: Politician merchant
- Profession: Marine

Military service
- Allegiance: Spanish Empire
- Branch/service: Spanish Navy
- Years of service: c.1577-1599
- Rank: Captain

Diego Rodriguez de Valdés y de la Banda (1557-1600) was a Spanish marine and politician, who served as governor of Buenos Aires.

== Biography ==
He was born in Salamanca, Spain, and arrived in the city of Buenos Aires as commander of the ship "San Andres", which arrived on the shores of the Río de la Plata on 5 January 1599 from Rio de Janeiro.

A few months after taking as governor, he received the news, the uprising of the Indians in Chile, with very few resources in Buenos Aires, Valdez sent a small detachment of soldiers commanded by his cousin Francisco Rodriguez del Manzano.

Diego Rodriguez de Valdés y de la Banda served as governor of the Río de la Plata from 8 July 1599 until his death on 20 December 1600.
