= Lopo de Alpoim =

Portuguese nobleman

- Fidalgo
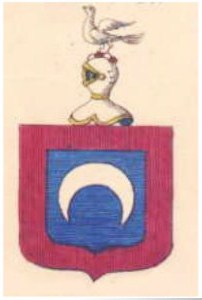
- Coat of Arms of Alpoims
- Born: 15th Century; Coimbra, Kingdom of Portugal
- Died: 15th Century; Covilhã, Kingdom of Portugal
- Noble family: Alpuims
- Spouse: Dominga Diaz
- Occupation: government

Lopo de Alpoim (c.1400–?) was a Portuguese nobleman, Alcaide of Montemor-o-Velho.

== Biography ==
Alpoim was born in Coimbra, son of Mendo de Alpoim and Guiomar de Vera, belonging to a noble family of Évora. He was married to Dominga Diaz, daughter of Gil Pires Gusmão, senhor de Pereira.

Lopo de Alpoim died in Covilhã, being buried in the Church of Montemor-o-Velho, having his grave, a shield with Fleur-de-lis. His family descended from noble families of French, Portuguese and Galician origin.
