= Mr. Yoga =

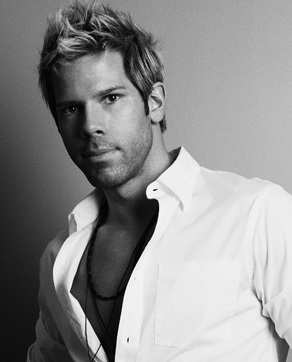
- Mr. Yoga Daniel Lacerda
- Born: Daniel Lacerda; February 11, 1975 (age 51); Toronto, Canada
- Occupations: author, yoga teacher
- Years active: 2005-present
- Website: mryoga.com

Daniel Lacerda, also known as Mr. Yoga, is a New York Times best selling author. He is the founder of Mr. Yoga, Inc. The Mr. Yoga, Inc. office is located in Beverly Hills, California.

Lacerda was born on February 11, 1985, in Toronto, Canada.

In 2015, Hachette Book Group published a book by Lacerda, called Mr. Yoga's 2,100 Asanas. It features 2,100 yoga poses (Asanas) photographed in colour by the author. All the poses in the book are demonstrated by Lacerda's yoga students. Mr. Yoga's 2,100 Asanas became a Toronto Star bestseller, Indie Healthy Living bestseller, was mentioned on Vanity Fair (magazine) Hot Type list, as well as making The New York Times bestsellers list.

Lacerda began his yoga studies in India under the Hindu Monk Dada Hari Krishnamacharya. He states that has catalogued many yoga poses mentioned in the Hatha Yoga Pradipika. Lacerda states further that the 2,100 Asanas of the first edition will be increased to "50,000 Asanas" in the second edition.
