= Palace of Parcent =

- Palacio de Parcent (Spanish)
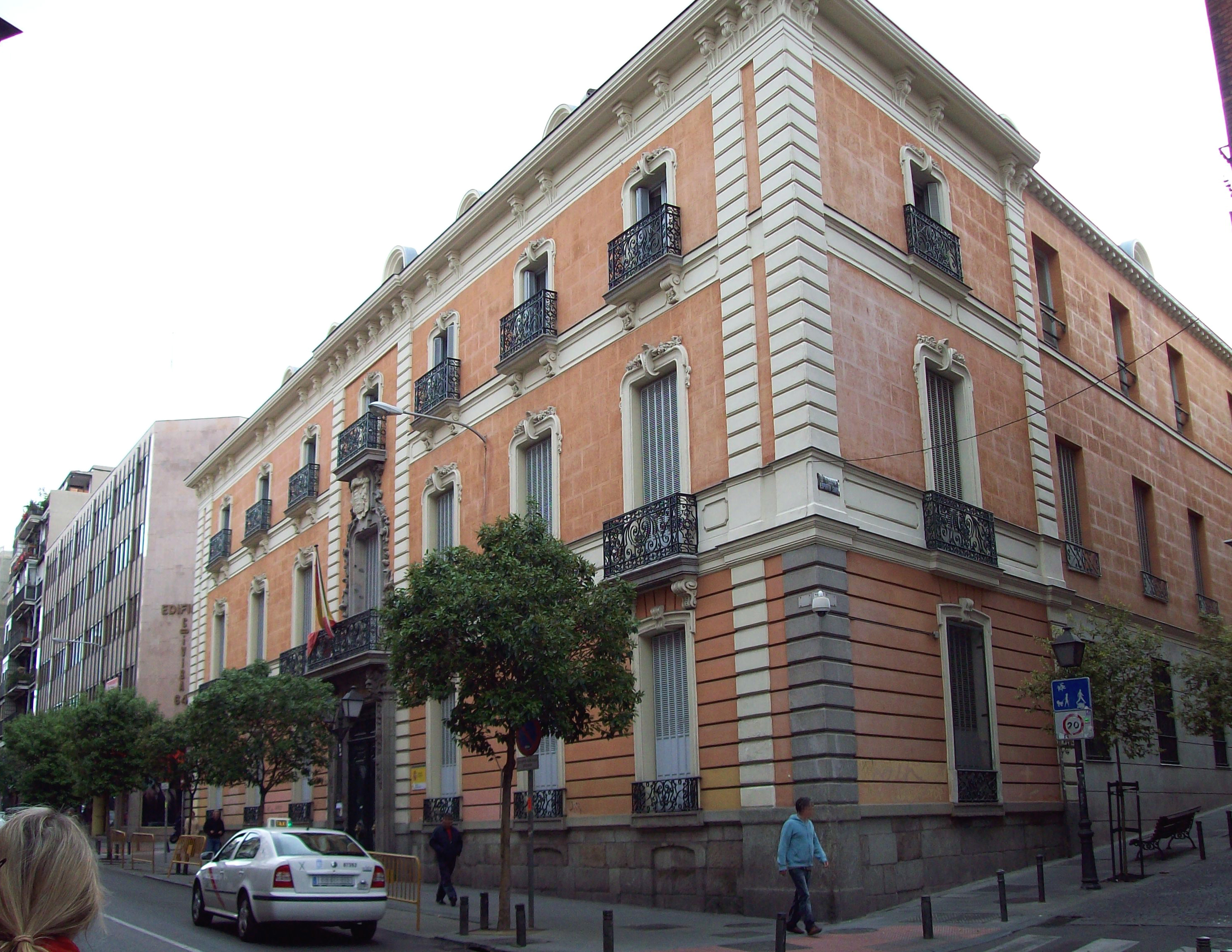

- Location within Spain
- 40.425872°N 3.707066°W
- Location: Madrid, Spain

Spanish Cultural Heritage
- Official name: Palacio de Parcent
- Type: Non-movable
- Criteria: Monument
- Designated: 1995
- Reference no.: RI-51-0009108

The Palace of Parcent (Spanish: Palacio de Parcent) is a palace located in Madrid, Spain. It was declared Bien de Interés Cultural in 1995.
