= Manuel Cabral de Alpoim =

Manuel Cabral de Melo e Alpoim
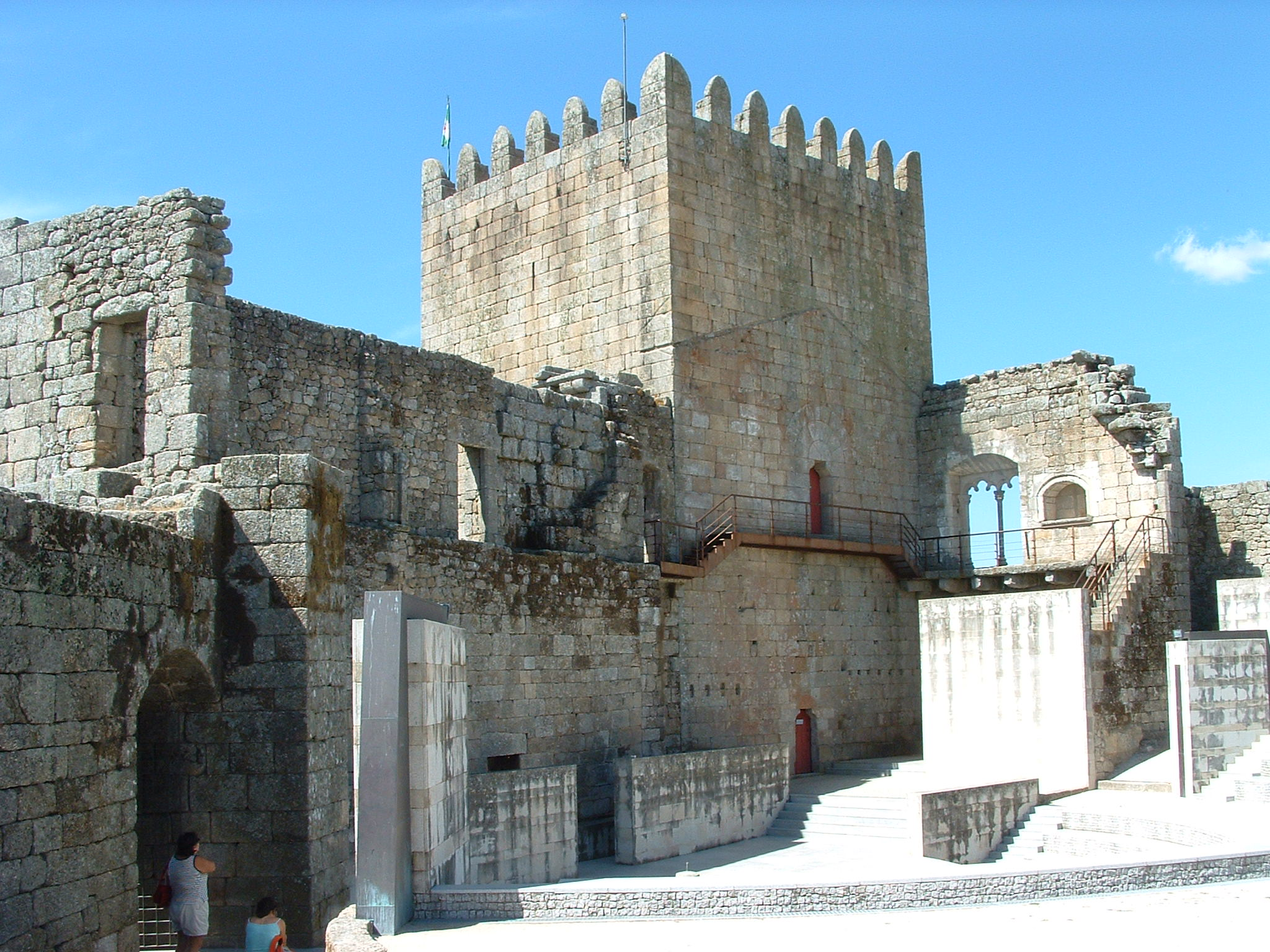
- Castle of Belmonte, belonging to their ancestors

Alcalde and Teniente de Gobernador of Corrientes
- Monarch: Philip IV

Personal details
- Born: 1589 Vila do Porto, São Miguel Island, Azores, Portugal
- Died: 1676 (aged 86–87) Corrientes, Argentina
- Spouse(s): Inés Arias de Mansilla; Juana Delgado de Espinosa
- Occupation: Conquistador explorer politician landowner
- Profession: Army's officer

Military service
- Allegiance: Spain
- Branch/service: Spanish Army
- Years of service: 1620-1676
- Rank: General

Manuel Cabral de Melo e Alpoim (1589–1676) was a Portuguese nobleman in the service of the Spanish Empire. He was one of the most important politicians of the Río de la Plata during the 17th century, serving as Alcalde and Regidor of Buenos Aires, and Lieutenant Governor of Corrientes and Santa Fe Province.

He also had an outstanding participation as a landowner, dedicated to cimarron cattle, being one of the most powerful accioneros (hunting) of South America. His parents belonged to noble families of the Iberian Peninsula, descendants of the Royal House of Portugal and Castile.

== Biography ==
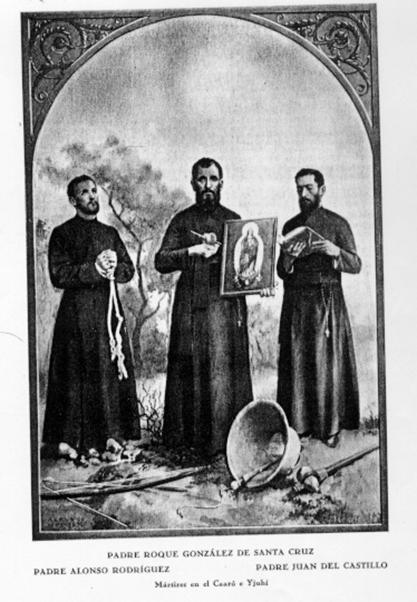
The Jesuit martyrs

Manuel was born in Vila do Porto, Santa Maria Island, son of Amador Vaz de Alpoim and Margarida Cabral de Melo, belonging to the Portuguese nobility. In 1598 he arrived at the Río de la Plata in the company of their parents. His family had lived for five years in the Portuguese colony of Brazil, in which they had taken refuge after the earthquake in the Azores islands of 1591.

He began his studies in Buenos Aires, to continue his education at Lisbon (Portugal). In 1613, he returned to Buenos Aires, and began to work in his father's business. By the year of 1617 his father dies in Buenos Aires, and his mother towards the year of 1630.

During the decades of 1620 and 1630s, Manuel Cabral de Melo e Alpoim occupied several government posts, including the positions of alcalde, regidor and Maestre de Campo. His first public office was in 1621, when he was appointed as Alcalde de la Hermandad, serving in the suburban and provincial area of Buenos Aires. Later he held the position of Regidor of the Cabildo de Buenos Aires, having an active participation in matters related to the Río de la Plata.

Resident in Corrientes he was appointed as Lieutenant Governor of Province in 1629. He led the crackdown against the rebel Indians, who in 1628, had murdered the Spanish Jesuits among them Roque González de Santa Cruz, cowardly attacked by the cacique Ñezú in reduction of San Nicolás, located across the Uruguay River. Commanding an army of 200 soldiers of Guarani origin, departed from the city of Itatí to Rio Grande do Sul, in support of the Jesuits. The rapid intervention of Alpoim, saved the lives of hundreds of people. Also gave approximately 40.000 cattle for creating stays in the area.

The heart of Roque González de Santa Cruz, burned and pierced with an arrow, was found by Alpoim inside a bag of relics. His heart wrapped in the blanket, was escorted by soldiers of Captain Alpoim to the city of Corrientes.

With large effort was also devoted to livestock, in 1620s, he had obtained permission for the exploitation of "ganado cimarron" (wild cattle and horses). He had a ranch in Monte Grande, and also ran his mother's ranch in Luján. In 1627 Pedro de Vera y Aragón made sale of his rights of Accionero Mayor del Ganado Vacuno, with jurisdiction in the city of San Juan de Vera de las Siete Corrientes.

Alpoim was a man highly respected by the natives of the area, giving permission for raising cattle to the Indians of the Reductions, to feed their families. In 1637-38, he participated in expeditions against the rebel tribes that inhabited in the region of Calchaquí Valleys. The expeditions were led by Governor Pedro Dávila Enriquez and its successor Mendo de la Cueva.

Manuel Cabral de Alpoim used some weapons for defense, he had two arquebus one of flint, and the other of ammunition. Also he possessed an iron spear, and a sword of habit of the Third . He held the position of Lieutenant of Governor of Corrientes between 1629 and 1633, and 1634 and 1636. And was elected Alcalde of first vote of Corrientes in 1656.

== Family and Ancestors ==
His father, Amador Vaz de Alpoim, was a wealthy merchant who had participated in the expedition of the Ciudad de los Césares. His mother Margarida Cabral de Melo, was an aristocratic lady, great-granddaughter of Lourenço Anes and Grimaneza Afonso de Melo, belonging to noble Azorean lineages.

Manuel Cabral de Melo was twice married, 1st, to Inés Arias de Mansilla, daughter of Francisco Arias de Mansilla (regidor) and Lucía de Espinosa. And to 2dly, with Juana Delgado de Espinosa, daughter of Captain Francisco Delgado de Ledesma and Jerónima de Espinosa. He had two daughters Margarita and Gregoria, and a son, Juan Cabral de Alpoim y Arias de Mansilla, alcalde, regidor and landowner of Corrientes Province.

In 1612, Alpoim traveled to Lisbon, where the King of Arms handed his Cartório da Nobreza (certificate of nobility). Her family includes among its illustrious ancestors; Kings of Portugal of Castile and France, also including the Royal House of England, through Afonso III of Portugal, grandson of Eleanor of England. He also was descendant of the same John, King of England, through of Álvaro Gonçalves da Maia, an ancestor of Beatriz de Noronha, wife of Álvaro Martins Homem.

Manuel Cabral de Melo e Alpoim claimed that his paternal ancestors were medieval knights of France, probably of Norman origin. His maternal ancestors were relatives to Gonçalo Velho Cabral and Pedro Álvares Cabral discoverers of Azores and Brazil.

In the city of Corrientes is found the National Historical Museum named, Museo Histórico de Corrientes Tte. Gdor. Manuel Cabral de Melo Alpoín.
