= Margarida Cabral de Melo =

Portuguese noble

Margarida Luísa Cabral de Melo
- Fidalga of the Royal House of Portugal.
- Born: 1570; Santa Maria Island, Azores, Kingdom of Portugal
- Died: 1631 (aged 60–61); Buenos Aires, Viceroyalty of Peru
- Buried: Iglesia de la Merced
- Noble family: Cabral-Melo Coutinho
- Spouse: Amador Vaz de Alpoim
- Father: Matias Nunes Cabral
- Mother: Maria Simões de Melo
- Occupation: landowner

Margarida Cabral de Melo (1570–1631) was a Portuguese noblewoman related to the discoverer of Brazil Pedro Álvares Cabral. In 1599 she settled with her husband and children in Buenos Aires. She was one of the most distinguished women in the Río de la Plata in the early 17th century, and was the owner of luxury homes, farms and vineyards.

Her family belonged to illustrious Portuguese lineages, including her royal ancestry through her great-great-grandmother, Dona Beatriz de Meneses, 2nd Countess of Loulé. She and her husband were the ancestors of Argentine politicians and military, among them Marcelo Torcuato de Alvear, President of the Argentine Republic between 1922 and 1928.

== Biography ==
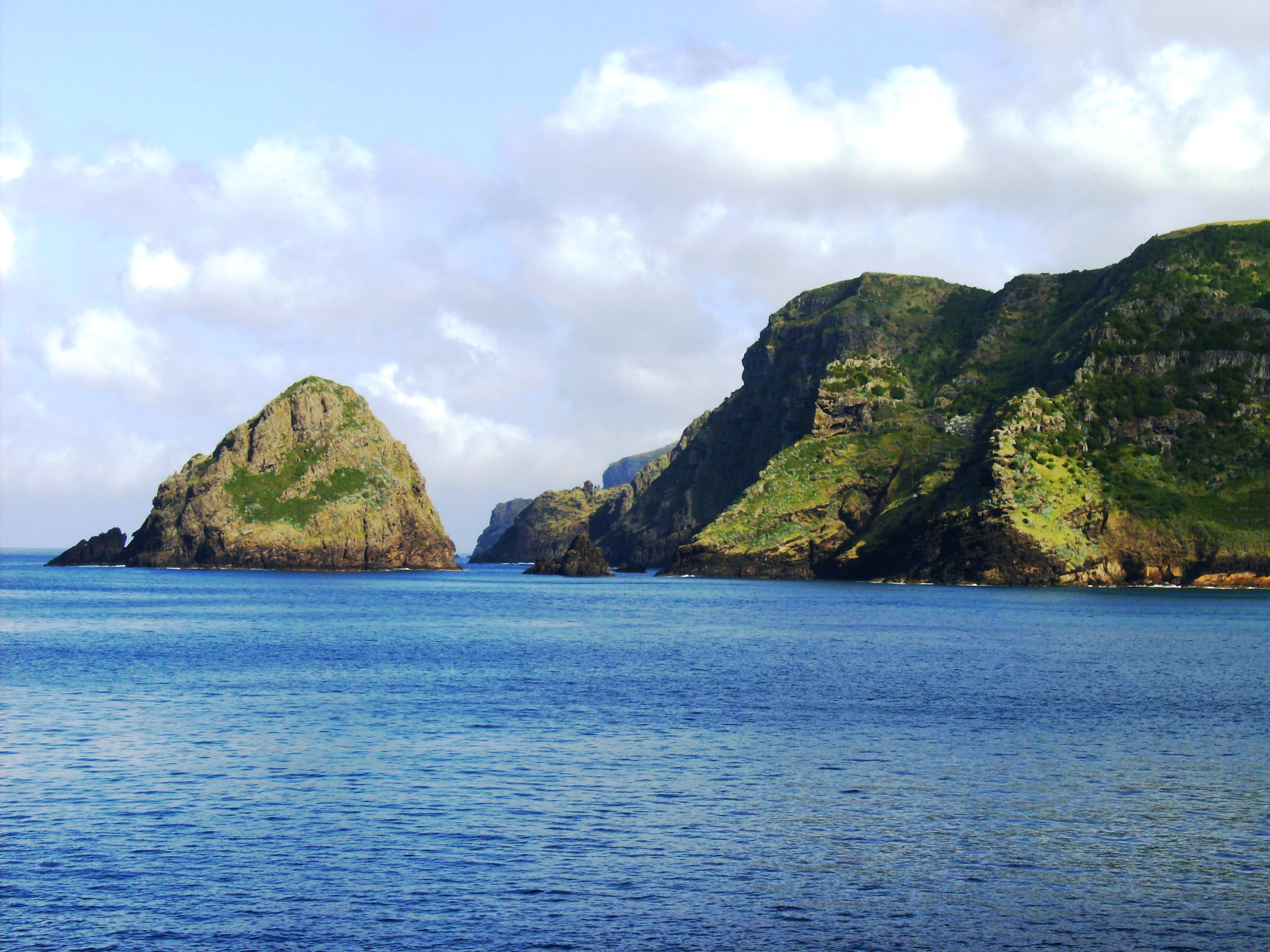
Azores Islands

Margarida was born in Santa Maria Island, the daughter of Matias Nunes Cabral, belonging to a noble Portuguese family, and Maria Simões, from a crypto-jewish family. She was married to Amador Vaz de Alpoim, son of Estevan de Alpoim and Isabel Velha. She and her family arrived in Buenos Aires from Rio de Janeiro, where they had lived for five years.

Margarida Cabral de Melo and her sister Inês Nunes Cabral (wife of Gil Gonçalves de Moura) were the first women to have political and economic influence in the Río de la Plata. Margarida was perhaps the richest woman in Buenos Aires towards the beginning of 1600. She possessed one of the most luxurious houses in the city, with mahogany furniture, carved silverware, tapestry and among its jewelry, a gold parrot.

The house of the family Cabral de Alpoim was located at the intersection of the streets Victoria and Balcarce, current neighborhood of Monserrat.

Margarida and her family were linked to the beginnings of cattle raising (cimarron cattle) in the current Argentine territory. She was the owner of a ranch located in the town of Luján, which was managed by her son Manuel Cabral de Alpoim.

Her husband died in 1617 being buried in the city. He had rendered military services to the Spanish Empire, taking part in some military expeditions led by Hernando Arias de Saavedra.

She had many sons and daughters, including General Amador Báez de Alpoim, who served as mayor of Buenos Aires, lieutenant governor of Santa Fe and Corrientes, and Matías Cabral de Melo y Alpoim (1593-1645) a well-known presbyter of Buenos Aires.

=== Ancestors and descendants ===
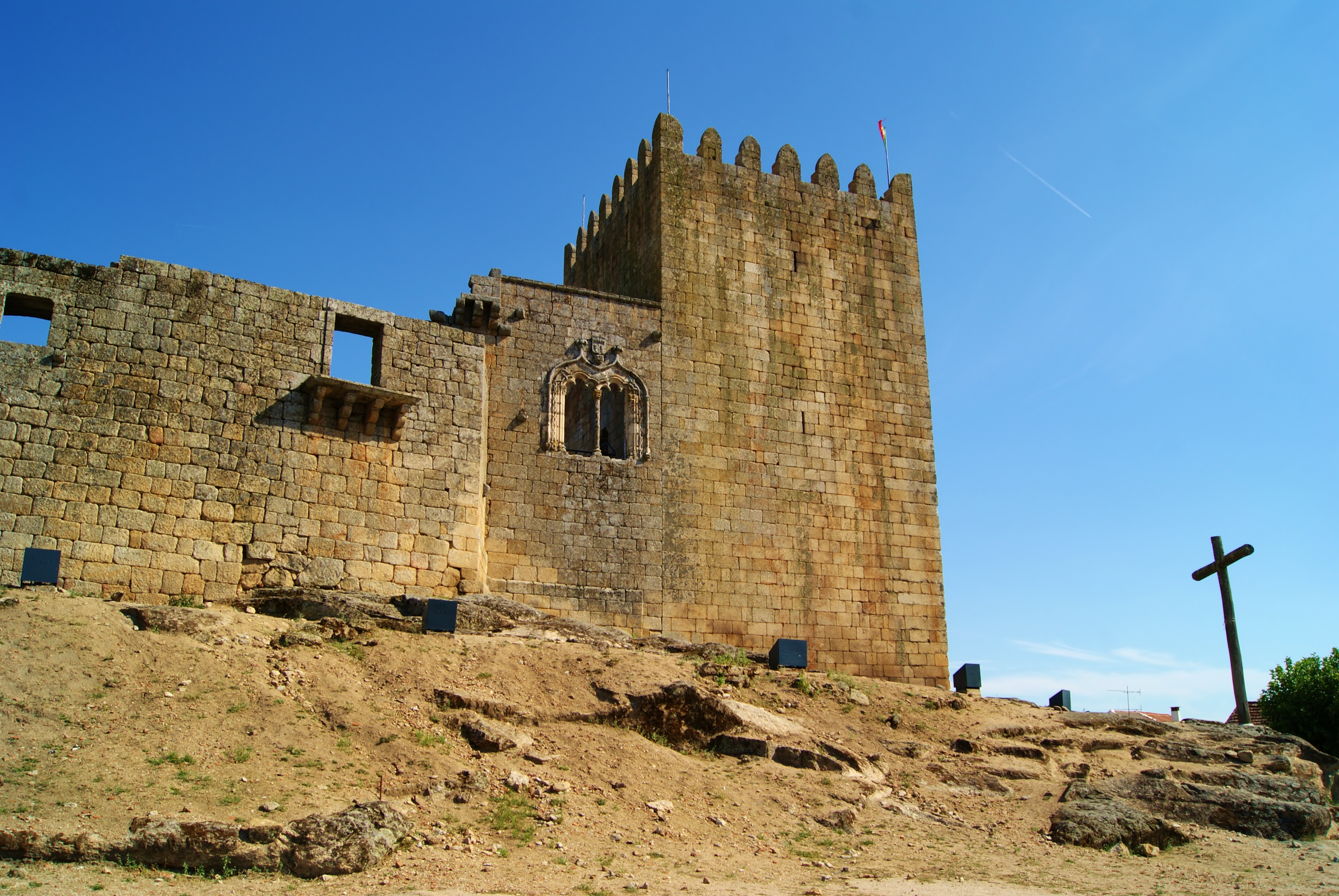
Belmonte Castle, belonging to the Cabral lineage

Margarita Cabral de Melo and her sister were relatives of Pedro Álvares Cabral, discoverer of Brazil and Gonçalo Velho Cabral, discoverer of Azores. Her most notorious ancestors were Álvaro Martins Homem 3°Captain of Praia, and João Fernandes de Andrade, possibly a descendant of Richard, 1st Earl of Cornwall.

It is proven that her family descended by several genealogical lines of the kings of Portugal, including Afonso III and John I of Portugal. Through these royal ancestors, their lineage is linked to the House of Plantagenet and Castile.

She and her sister were the ancestors of various historical figures linked to the politics and culture of the Río de la Plata like Juan Manuel de Rosas, governor of the province of Buenos Aires between 1835 and 1852, and Justo José de Urquiza, first President of the Argentine Confederation.

Other famous descendants of this family include José Gervasio Artigas, a Uruguayan patriot who participated in the War of Independence, and Carlos María de Alvear, a military and politician who served as Supreme Director of the United Provinces of the Río de la Plata in 1815.

Her sister Inés Núñez Cabral and Gil Gonçalves de Moura were the ancestors of the writer and poet Jorge Luis Borges.
