= Estêvão Pires de Alpoim =

Portuguese nobleman

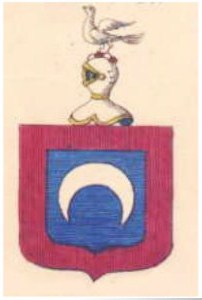
- Coat of Arms of Alpoim
- Born: 1520; Santa Maria Island, Azores
- Died: c. 1570; Santa Maria Island, Azores
- Noble family: Alpuims
- Spouse: Grimanesa Pires
- Occupation: Government

Estêvão Pires de Alpoim (1520–1570s) was a Portuguese nobleman. He served as notary of government in the Azores Islands.

== Biography ==
Alpoim was born in Santa Maria Island, the son of Pedro Annes d'Alpoim, one of the first settlers of Azores, and África Anes, a noblewoman, born in Portugal. His wife was Grimanesa Pires, daughter of Pedro Vaz Marinheiro.

His son Estêvão de Alpoim was a nobleman from the Royal House of Portugal. He was married to Isabel Velha, possible descendant of Fernão Velho.
