= Gonçalo Pereira =

Portuguese prelate

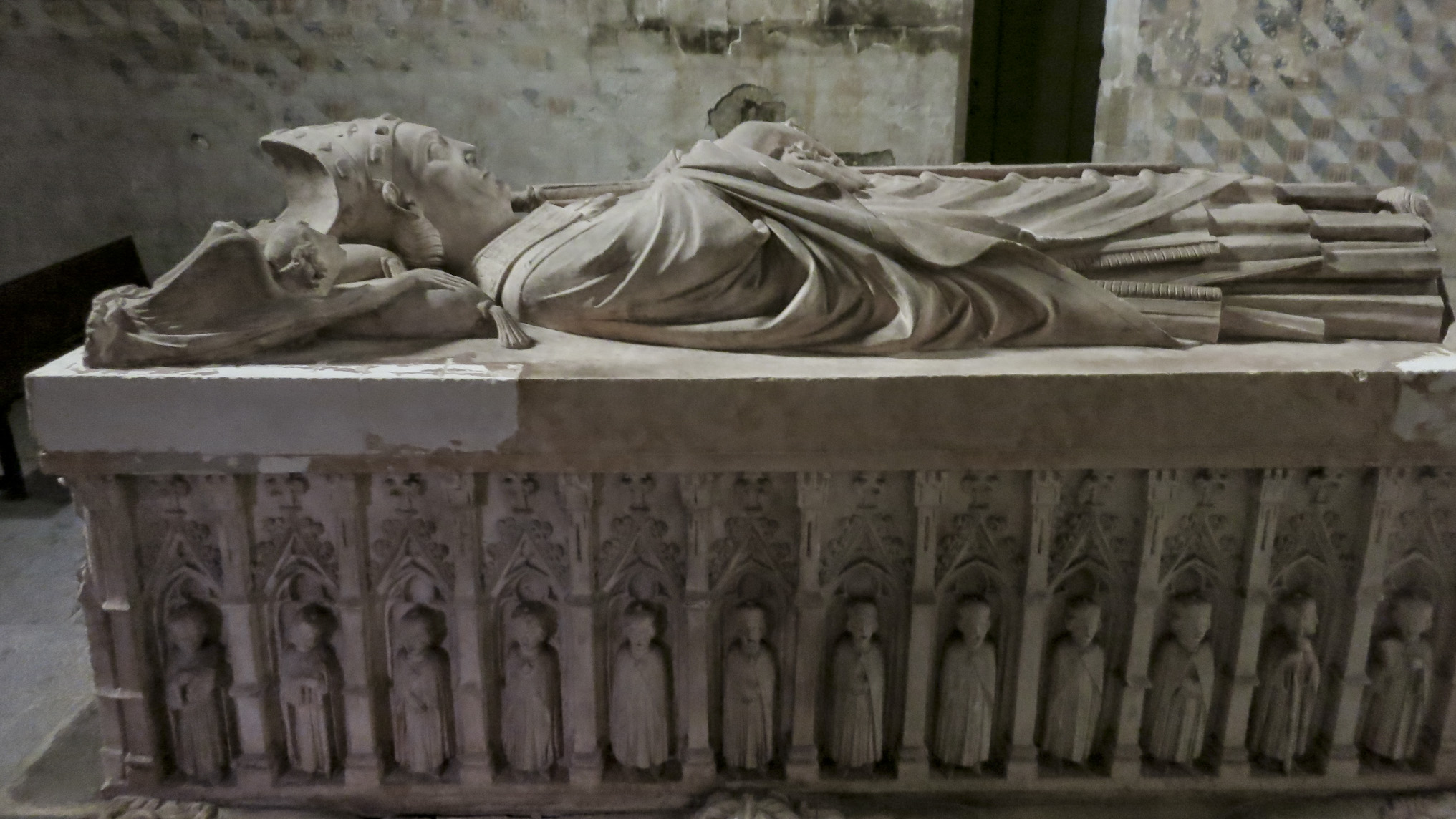
Tomb of Gonçalo Pereira in Braga

Gonçalo (Gonçalves) Pereira (c.1280–1348) was a Portuguese prelate of the Catholic Church who served as the archbishop of Braga from 1326 until 1349.

Pereira was a son of Gonçalo Pires Pereira, who held the titles of count of the Kingdom of Portugal and knight commander of the Sovereign Military Order of Malta. After being raised at the court of King Denis of Portugal, he studied law at the University of Salamanca, where he met Teresa Peres Vilarinho (1285-?). Their son, Álvaro Gonçalves Pereira (c. 1310 - c. 1379), was the father of Constable Nuno Álvares Pereira, an ancestor of the House of Braganza.

After completing his studies, he returned to Portugal, where he became a canon of the Cathedral Chapter of the Diocese of Tuy and, later, dean of the Chapter of the Cathedral of Porto. In 1320, King Denis sent him and Admiral Manuel Pessanha as envoys to the papal court at Avignon to obtain, among other things, financial aid for the war against the Moors.

In the following year he was elected bishop of Évora but was never consecrated bishop of that see. On 21 August 1322, Pope John XXII appointed him bishop of Lisbon. The decrees of the diocesan synod that he held in 1324 were seen as imposing excessive financial burdens and were revoked by his successor. In 1326, Pope John XXII appointed him archbishop of Braga, a post that he held until his death on 22 December 1348.

He helped Queen Elizabeth settle the quarrels between her husband King Denis and their son, the future Afonso IV. In 1338 he was King Afonso's ambassador to the Crown of Castile, arranging peace between the two kingdoms. He participated in the famous Battle of Río Salado on 30 October 1340, when the joint forces of both kingdoms destroyed those of Sultan Abu al-Hasan 'Ali of Morocco and Yusuf I of Granada.

== Bibliography ==
- LARA, António da Costa de Albuquerque de Sousa, SAMPAIO, Vasco de Bettencourt de Faria Machado e, AZEVEDO, Marcelo Olavo Correia de, Ascendências Reais de Sua Alteza Real a Senhora Dona Isabel de Herédia Duquesa de Bragança, vol. I, Lisboa, Universitária Editora, 1999.
