= Álvaro Gonçalves Pereira =

Portuguese archbishop

- Álvaro Gonçalves Pereira
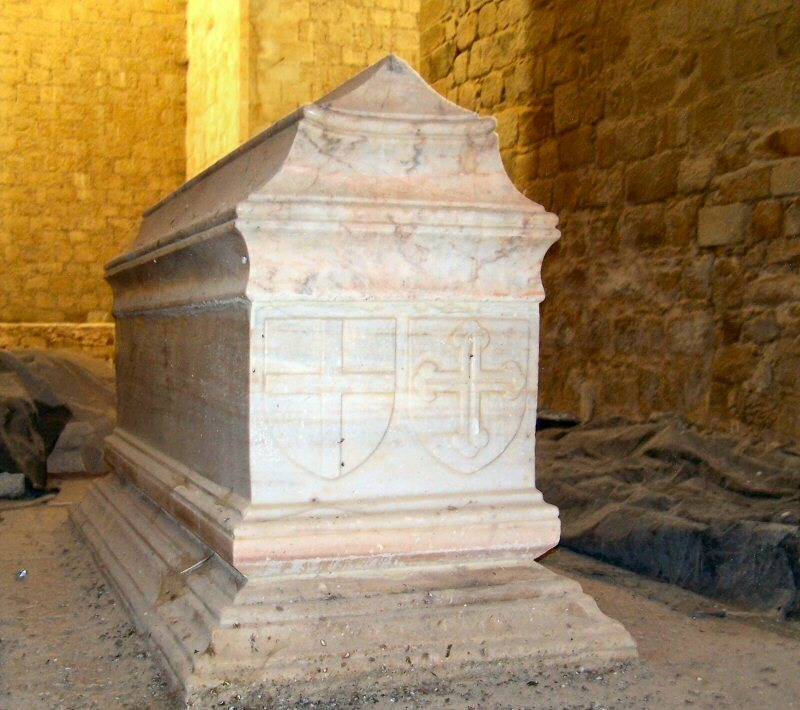
- Tomb of D. Álvaro Gonçalves Pereira
- Born: c.1300 Salamanca
- Died: 1379; Amieira do Tejo
- Buried: Monastery of Flor da Rosa
- Father: Gonçalo Pereira
- Mother: Teresa Peres Vilarinho

Álvaro Gonçalves Pereira (European Portuguese: [ˈalvɐɾu ɣõˈsalvɨʃ pɨˈɾɐjɾɐ]), Prior of Crato, was born to Gonçalo (Gonçalves) Pereira, 97th Archbishop of Braga (1326-1349) and Teresa Peres Vilarinho. At a very young age, he entered the Order of St. John of the Hospitallers. At Rhodes, at the time seat of the Order, he fought the Turks in the galleys of the Hospitallers so proving his worth that the Grand Master made him Prior of the Hospitallers in Portugal. There he founded the Castle of Amieira, the palaces of Bonjardim and the Monastery of Flor da Rosa, near Crato, the seat of the Order in Portugal. He administered the Order with great zeal and won a brilliant victory at Salado. He was one of the eminent figures of the reigns of Kings Afonso IV, Peter I and Ferdinand I. He died at an advanced age ca 1375. He was the father of the Constable of Portugal, Nuno Álvares Pereira.

== Offspring ==
Marriage was prohibited by his order, but he had 32 children, including: Pedro Álvares Pereira, Prior of Crato and Master of Calatrava who died at the Battle of Aljubarrota fighting for King John I of Castile in 1385; Nuno Álvares Pereira; Rodrigo Álvares Pereira, legitimized by King Peter I of Portugal and one of the most respected noblemen under Portuguese Kings Peter I, Ferdinand I and John I; Violante Alvares Pereira, noblewoman and wife of Martim Goncalves de Lacerda, a Castilian Knight in service to King John I of Portugal; and Diogo Álvares Pereira, Prior of the Order of St. John
