= Nuno Pereira (footballer) =

Macanese footballer (born 1997)

Nuno Jerónimo 李智朗
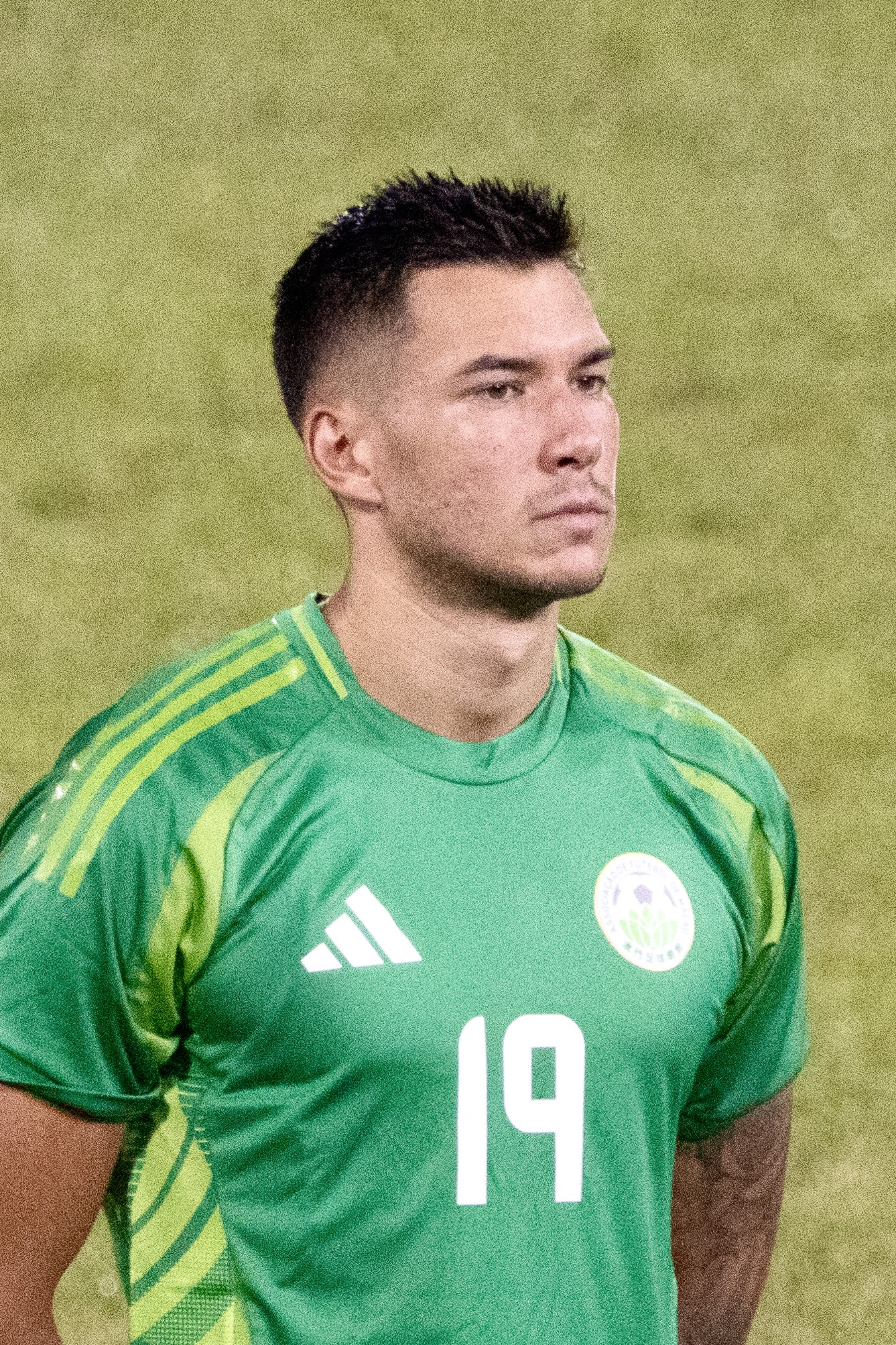
- Jerónimo with Macau in 2024

Personal information
- Full name: Nuno Jerónimo Augusto Neves Pereira
- Date of birth: 22 November 1997 (age 28)
- Place of birth: Autonomous Region of Macau, Portugal
- Height: 1.76 m (5 ft 9 1/2 in)
- Position: Midfielder

Team information
- Current team: Barreirense
- Number: 32

Youth career
- –2019: Gainsborough

Senior career*
Years	Team	Apps	(Gls)
2019–2020	Gainsborough		
2020	S.U. 1º Dezembro		
2020	Vilar de Perdizes		
2021	Leça F.C.		
2021–2022	AD Marco 09		
2022–2024	Imortal DC	0	(0)
2024–	Barreirense	0	(0)

International career^{‡}
2023–	Macau	5	(0)
- * Club domestic league appearances and goals as of 18 March 2018 ‡ National team caps and goals as of 7 June 2019

Nuno Jerónimo Augusto Neves Pereira (Chinese: 李智朗; born 22 November 1997) is a Macanese footballer who plays as a midfielder for Setúbal FA First Division club Barreirense and the Macau national team.

== Early life and education ==
Jerónimo was born in Macau and has Portuguese nationality. He is the son of Nuno Pereira. He studied in England.

== Club career ==
In 2018, Jerónimo signed for English side Gainsborough, where he became the club's first player to receive an international call-up while playing for them.

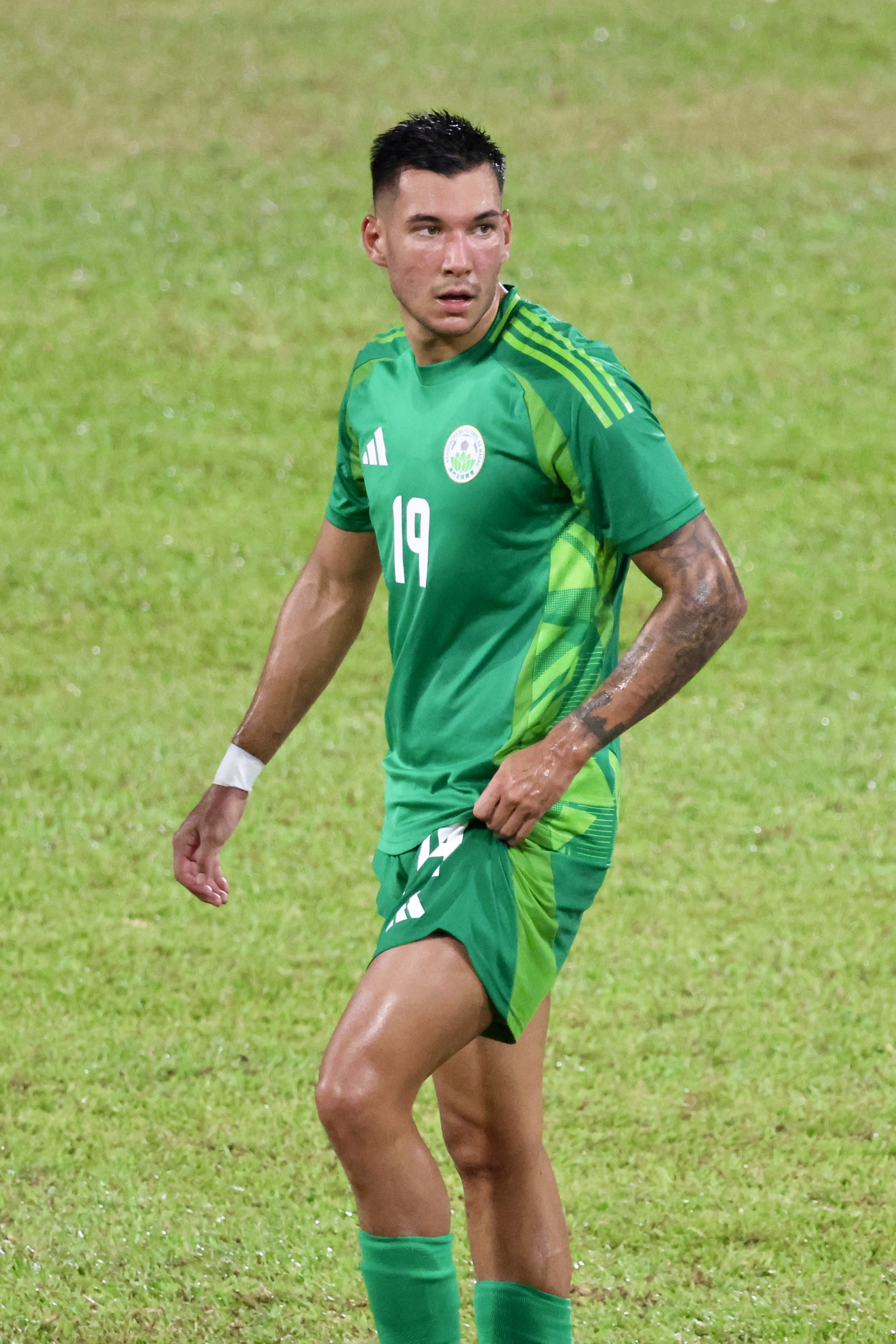
Jerónimo playing for Macau during the 2027 AFC Asian Cup qualification match against Brunei.

== International career ==
In 2023, Jerónimo he made his international debut playing for the Macau national team against the Bhutan national team.

== Style of play ==
Jerónimo mainly operates as a midfielder.
