= Pedro Vaz Marinheiro =

Portuguese nobleman and colonizer of the Azores Islands

Personal details
- Born: Portugal
- Died: 7 May 1534 Portugal
- Occupation: Navigator

Military service
- Allegiance: Kingdom of Portugal

Pedro Vaz Marinheiro was a Portuguese nobleman, navigator, resident and colonizer of the Azores Islands.

Pedro Vaz was born in Iberian Peninsula. He was one of the first settlers of the São Miguel Island, where he was known as "Marinheiro" due to the large number of ships he had in his residence located in Ponta Delgada. He was the father of Grimaneza Pires, who married in Azores with Estêvão Pires de Alpoim, notary in Santa Maria Island.

His brother, Diogo Vaz, was an inhabitant of Lagoa, Azores.
