= John Falconet =

Portuguese military personnel

- Knight
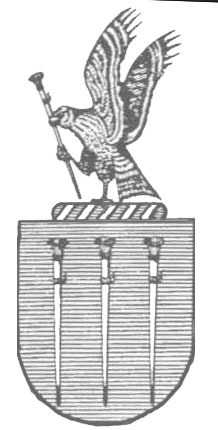
- Falcão coat of arms
- Born: 1350; Kingdom of England
- Died: 1400s Benavente, Kingdom of Portugal
- Spouses: Catharina de Estranberg; Maria da Silva
- Father: Simon Folche
- Mother: Mary de Kerche
- Occupation: Military

John Falconet (Portuguese: João Falcão), (1350–1400s) was an English nobleman, member of the Court of Philippa of Lancaster.

== Biography ==
Falconet was born in England, son of Simon Folche and Mary de Kerche. All his paternal ancestors were members of the Parliament of England.

in 1386, Falconet arrived in Portugal, as a member of the delegation of John of Gaunt. He was married to Maria da Silva, daughter of Gonçalo Anes de Abreu.

John Falconet died in the early 15th century, in the city of Benavente.
