= Luis de Alpoim =

Portuguese politician

Luís de Alpoim
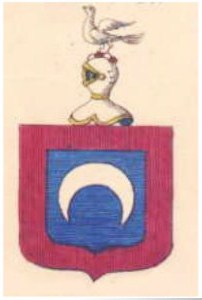
- coat of arms of Alpoim

Personal details
- Born: Luis de Alpuy; 13th century Coimbra, Kingdom of Portugal
- Died: 14th century Coimbra, Kingdom of Portugal
- Occupation: Ambassador
- Profession: Knight

Luís de Alpoim (13th century) was a medieval Knight, ambassador to England, France and the Holy Roman Empire.

== Biography ==
Luís was born in Portugal, son of Gomes de Alpoim, a knight of Afonso III of Portugal and Ximena Pereira, daughter of Gonçalo Pereira, Lord of Castro Verde. His wife was Dominga Cabral, daughter of João de Sella Cabral, Lord of Pinhel. Alpoim was descendant of Martim de Freitas, Alcaide of Coimbra.

His descendants included João de Alpoim, ambassador to Castile, Amador Vaz de Alpoim, colonizer of Buenos Aires in the 17th century. And José Maria de Alpoim, Minister of Justice of José Luciano de Castro.
