= Martim Gonçalves de Lacerda =

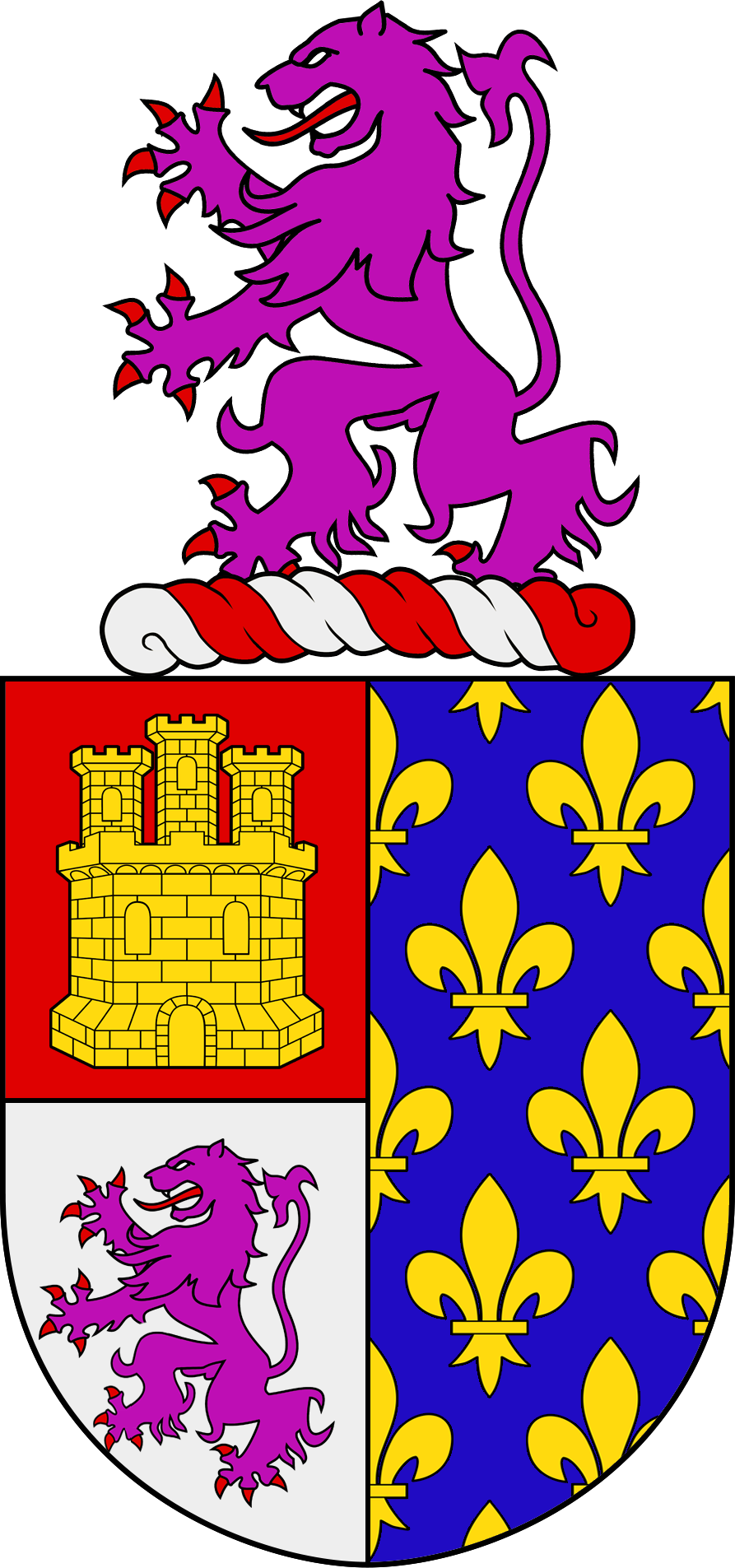
- Born: 14th-century Castile
- Died: 15th-century Portugal
- Father: Diogo Nunes de Serpa
- Mother: N de La Cerda

Martim Gonçalves de Lacerda (14th-century) was a Castilian nobleman. He came to Portugal in times of John I, serving as a vassal of the Royal House.

== Biography ==
Martim was the son of Diogo Nunes de Serpa and N de La Cerda, the illegitimate daughter of Charles de La Cerda. By maternal line his ancestors belonged to the House of Brienne, belonging to the French high nobility. Among his ancestors was John of Brienne, who was King of Jerusalem, since 1210 to 1225.

Martim Gonçalves de Lacerda was married to Violante Pereira, daughter of Álvaro Gonçalves Pereira.
