= House of la Cerda =

Spanish noble house

Arm of the House of la Cerda to the 13th century, a combination of Castile and León, from infante Fernando, and the arms of France, for Blanche of France.

The House of la Cerda is a noble line of the Crown of Castile descending from the Infante Ferdinand de la Cerda, eldest son of King Alfonso X. It was one of four noble lineages that arose directly from the Castilian royal family during the thirteenth century and is the origin of the Dukes of Medinaceli.

== Origin of the lineage ==
The origin of the lineage stems from Infante Alfonso de la Cerda (1270–1333), son of the heir to the throne, Infante Ferdinand de la Cerda who died before his father, Alfonso X. Alfonso X always stated his successor was his grandson Alfonso de la Cerda, instead of his second son, Infante Sancho. This motivated Sancho to revolt against his father. After a long civil war Sancho was finally crowned. Following an unsuccessful invasion by Aragon and Portugal, a peace settlement removed the Infantes de la Cerda from contention for the Castilian throne.

== Leading role in Castilian politics ==
The lineage of de La Cerda continued throughout the Middle Ages and was constituted as a noble house of the first rank, playing a leading role in Castilian politics. This line, like others from the Civil War of the mid-fourteenth century, continued through the female line to shift the family heritage until Dona Isabel de la Cerda married Bernal de Foix, first Count of Medinaceli. Currently, the House of La Cerda branches into several noble families: the House of the Dukes of Medinaceli, as direct heirs of Fernando and Alfonso la Cerda, and its minor Ducal House of Parcent. From the House of Parcent (dukes since 1916) stem the minor noble houses of the Marquissates of Eguaras (in the House of La Cerda since 1799) and of Cañada-Honda (created in 1893 for Emilio Drake de La Cerda, grandson of the Count of Parcent)

== See also ==
- Lacerda (surname)
