= Historiography of the Spanish Inquisition =

How historians and commentators have viewed the Spanish Inquisition has changed over time and continues to be a source of controversy. Before and during the 19th century, historical interest focused on who was being persecuted. In the early and mid-20th century, historians examined the specifics of what happened and how it influenced Spanish history. In the later 20th and 21st centuries, some historians have re-examined how severe the Inquisition truly was, calling into question some of the assumptions made in earlier periods.

== 19th to early 20th century scholarship ==
Before the rise of professional historians in the 19th century, the Spanish Inquisition had been portrayed primarily by Protestant scholars who saw it as the archetypal symbol of Catholic intolerance and ecclesiastical power. The Spanish Inquisition for them was largely associated with the persecution of Protestants. William H. Prescott described the Inquisition as an "eye that never slumbered". Despite the existence of extensive documentation regarding the trials and procedures, and to the Inquisition's deep bureaucratization, none of these sources were studied outside of Spain, and Spanish scholars arguing against the predominant view were automatically dismissed. The 19th-century professional historians, including the Spanish scholar Amador de los Ríos, were the first to successfully challenge this perception in the international sphere and get foreign scholars to take note of their discoveries. Said scholars would obtain international recognition and start a period of revision on the Black Legend of the Spanish Inquisition.

At the start of the 20th century Henry Charles Lea published the groundbreaking History of the Inquisition in Spain. This influential work describes the Spanish Inquisition as "an engine of immense power, constantly applied for the furtherance of obscurantism, the repression of thought, the exclusion of foreign ideas and the obstruction of progress." Lea documented the Inquisition's methods and modes of operation in no uncertain terms, calling it "theocratic absolutism" at its worst. In the context of the polarization between Protestants and Catholics during the second half of the 19th century, some of Lea's contemporaries, as well as most modern scholars thought Lea's work had an anti-Catholic bias.

Starting in the 1920s, Jewish scholars picked up where Lea's work left off. They published Yitzhak Baer's History of the Jews in Christian Spain, Cecil Roth's History of the Marranos and, after World War II, the work of Haim Beinart, who for the first time published trial transcripts of cases involving conversos.

Contemporary historians who subscribe to the idea that the image of the Inquisition in historiography has been systematically deformed by the Black Legend include Edward Peters, Philip Wayne Powell, William S. Maltby, Richard Kagan, Margaret R. Greer, Helen Rawlings, Ronnie Hsia, Lu Ann Homza, Stanley G. Payne, Andrea Donofrio, Irene Silverblatt, Christopher Schmidt-Nowara, Charles Gibson, and Joseph Pérez. Contemporary historians who partially accept an impact of the Black Legend but deny other aspects of the hypothesis include Henry Kamen, David Nirenberg and Karen Armstrong.

Toby Green, while accepting that there was a certain demonization of the Spanish Inquisition in comparison with other contemporary persecutions, argues that the habitual use of torture should not be denied, and that correcting the "black legend" should not mean replacing it with a "white legend." Richard L. Kagan says that Henry Kamen failed to "enter the belly of the beast and assess what it really meant to the people who lived with it." Kamen does not, according to Kagan, "lead the reader through an actual trial. Had he done so, a reader might conclude that the institution he portrays as relatively benign in hindsight was also capable of inspiring fear and desperate attempts to escape, and thus more deserving of its earlier reputation." For Kagan, in order to reconstruct the world of those who were trapped in the Inquisition's net, studies that thoroughly examine the meticulous archives of the Inquisition are necessary.

== Revision after 1960 ==
The works of Juderias in (1913) and other Spanish scholars prior to him were mostly ignored by international scholarship until 1960.

One of the first books to build on them and internationally challenge the classical view was The Spanish Inquisition (1965) by Henry Kamen. Kamen argued that the Inquisition was not nearly as cruel or as powerful as commonly believed. The book was very influential and largely responsible for subsequent studies in the 1970s to try to quantify (from archival records) the Inquisition's activities. Those studies showed an initial burst of activity against conversos suspected of relapsing into Judaism, and a mid-16th century pursuit of Protestants, but, according to these studies, the Inquisition served principally as a forum Spaniards occasionally used to humiliate and punish people they did not like: blasphemers, bigamists, foreigners and, in Aragon, homosexuals, and horse smugglers. Kamen went on to publish two more books in 1985 and 2006 that incorporated new findings, further supporting the view that the Inquisition was not as bad as once described by Lea and others. Along similar lines is Edward Peters's Inquisition (1988).

One of the most important works about the inquisition's relation to the Jewish conversos or New Christians is The Origins of the Inquisition in Fifteenth-Century Spain (1995/2002) by Benzion Netanyahu. It challenges the view that most conversos were actually practicing Judaism in secret and were persecuted for their crypto-Judaism. Rather, according to Netanyahu, the persecution was fundamentally racial, and was a matter of envy of their success in Spanish society. This view has been challenged; the majority of historians either align with religious causes or with merely cultural ones, with no significant racial element.

== Causes ==
The Spanish Inquisition emerged from a complex interplay of social, political, and religious factors. The "multi-religious hypothesis" highlights Spain’s diverse society, where Catholics, Jews, and Muslims coexisted in relative peace (convivencia), though with unequal legal status, until anti-Jewish riots in 1391 led to mass conversions. The "enforcement across borders hypothesis" suggests the Inquisition was a tool for the Catholic Monarchs to assert royal authority over fragmented noble factions, using Catholicism as a unifying force. The "placate Europe hypothesis" posits that the Inquisition and expulsions of Jews and Moriscos aimed to counter Spain’s negative image as a land of “impure blood” and align it with European Christian norms to secure alliances. The "Ottoman scare hypothesis" points to fears of Morisco collaboration with an expanding Ottoman Empire. The "Renaissance hypothesis" aligns the Inquisition with centralizing political philosophies, while the "checking the Pope hypothesis" views it as a strategic move to limit papal influence by placing the Inquisition under royal control. Economic motives and rising intolerance, mirroring broader European trends, may have also played roles, though purely religious devotion is debated given Ferdinand’s pragmatic political persona.

=== Too multi-religious hypothesis ===
The Spanish Inquisition emerged in response to the multi-religious society of Spain after the reconquest of the Iberian Peninsula from the Muslim Moors. The Reconquista did not fully expel Muslims, who, along with Jews, were initially tolerated by the Christian elite. Major cities such as Seville, Valladolid, and Barcelona had significant Jewish populations in Juderia, but Muslims faced increasing alienation from power centers.

Cultural historian Américo Castro describes post-reconquest medieval Spain as a society of relatively peaceful coexistence (convivencia), marked by occasional conflict among Catholics, Jews, and Muslims. Kamen described this "so-called convivencia" as featuring unequal relationships. Despite legal disparities, Jews long served the Crown of Aragon in prominent religious and political roles. Castile had an unofficial rabbi, and Ferdinand’s father, John II, appointed the Jewish Abiathar Crescas as Court Astronomer.

Anti-Jewish sentiment grew across Europe in the late 13th and 14th centuries, with England and France expelling Jews in 1290 and 1306. In Spain, this prejudice peaked during the 1391 anti-Jewish riots in cities such as Barcelona and Valencia, killing thousands. New converts, called conversos or New Catholics, were distinguished from long-established Catholic families.

According to Don Hasdai Crescas, persecution began in Seville in June 1391, on the 1st of Tammuz. The violence spread to Córdoba, reached Toledo (then called Ṭulayṭulah by Jews) by mid-June, and hit Mallorca and Barcelona by the 1st of Elul, killing about 250 in Barcelona. Jews in Lleida, Gironda, Valencia, and Al-Andalus (Andalucía) also suffered. Many died as martyrs, while others converted.

Ferrand Martínez, Archdeacon of Ecija, fueled the unrest, affecting nearly all Spanish Jews. An estimated 200,000 Jews converted or hid their faith, known in Hebrew as Anusim, or "those compelled [to hide their religion]". Only a few prominent Jews, sheltered by viceroys in outlying areas, escaped.

Forced baptism violated Catholic Church law, and theoretically, those forcibly baptized could revert to Judaism. However, legal definitions limited this to baptisms under physical force; those consenting under threat of death or injury were considered voluntary converts, barred from returning to Judaism. After 1391, many converts "felt safer remaining in their new religion." This created a new social group, conversos or New Christians, who, free from Jewish occupational restrictions, secured prominent roles in 15th-century Spain, including in government, the Church, and finance. Notable conversos included physicians Andrés Laguna and Francisco López de Villalobos (Ferdinand’s court physician), writers Juan del Encina, Juan de Mena, Diego de Valera, and Alonso de Palencia, and bankers Luis de Santángel and Gabriel Sánchez, who funded Christopher Columbus, Bishop Pablo de Santa Maria (author of Scrutinium Scripturarum), Jeronimo de Santa Fe (Hebraomastix) and Pedro de la Caballeria (Zelus Christi contra Judaeos).) Some conversos, despite opposition, rose in the ecclesiastical hierarchy, occasionally becoming vocal critics of Judaism. Others gained noble titles, prompting later works claiming many Spanish nobles descended from Israelites.

=== Enforcement across borders hypothesis ===
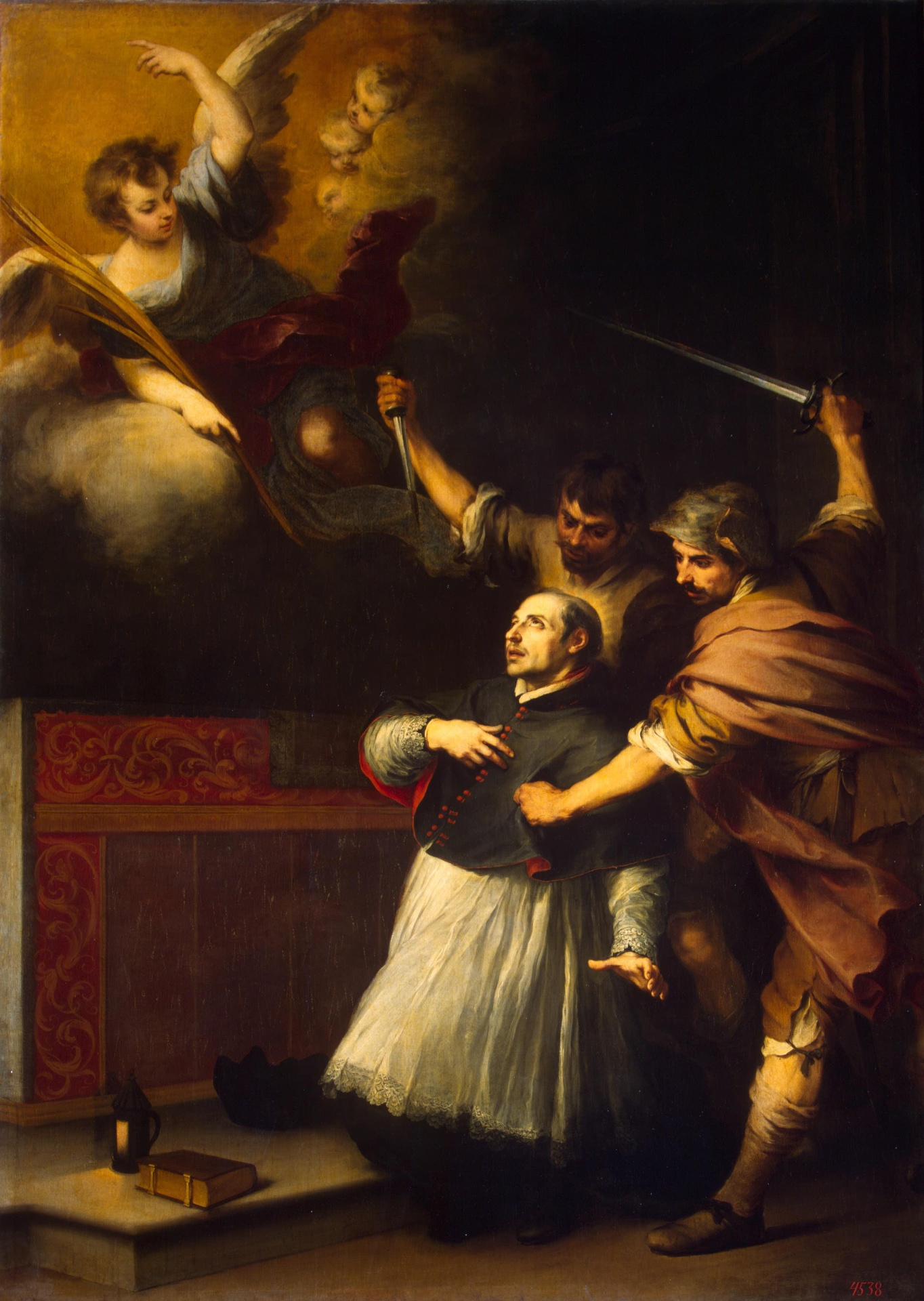
Bartolomé Esteban Murillo: Death of the Inquisitor Pedro de Arbués, painted by Bartolomé Esteban Murillo in 1664

The Spanish Inquisition may have been established in part to standardize the diverse laws and jurisdictions across Spain, functioning similarly to the Santa Hermandad, a crown-controlled law enforcement body akin to the Guardia Civil that prosecuted criminals across counties, bypassing local authorities. It aimed to ensure uniform enforcement of royal laws. The Kingdom of Castile’s prosperity in Europe stemmed from the king’s strong authority over the nobility, maintaining political stability and preventing internal conflicts that weakened nations such as England. Under the Trastámara dynasty, however, kings of Castile and Aragon lost power to nobles who formed dissenting factions. Taxation and privileges varied by county, and powerful noble families in Aragon often extracted concessions from the crown. The Catholic Monarchs sought to unite their kingdoms and bolster royal influence for stability. They built a combined army to overpower the factions and aimed to unify laws while keeping their kingdoms separate during their lifetimes, due to mutual distrust. To maintain control without merging realms, they needed an executive, legislative, and judicial body under the Crown, operating in both kingdoms. The Inquisition, according to this hypothesis, fulfilled that role. Catholicism, common to both kingdoms and widely supported, was a suitable institution to oversee this.

Backed by both realms, the Inquisition operated independently of nobility and local interests, serving as a personal police force and legal code for Isabella and Ferdinand, without altering existing structures. In this view, prosecuting heretics was secondary or indistinguishable from targeting conspirators, traitors, or groups resisting royal authority. Since royal power rested on divine right and oaths before God, religious deviation equated to political disloyalty. The Inquisition’s focus on nobility and high clergy, alongside handling administrative and civil crimes such as counterfeiting royal seals and currency, ensuring royal orders’ transmission, and verifying official documents, supports this hypothesis.

=== Placate Europe hypothesis ===
As Europe increasingly expelled Jews from Christian kingdoms, Spaniards faced suspicion and contempt for their perceived "impure blood." With a shrinking world and growing importance of foreign relations, the reputation of Spaniards as "descendants of Jews and Moors" posed challenges. The coup enabling Isabella to seize the throne from Joanna of Castile ("la Beltraneja") and the marriage of the Catholic Monarchs strained ties with Portugal, Spain’s traditional ally, necessitating new alliances. Aragon’s ambitions focused on Mediterranean control and defense against France.

The Catholic Monarchs, through their policy of royal marriages, sought to counter France’s rising power with strong dynastic ties across Europe. Spain’s perceived tolerance became a liability in this context. Despite prestige from the reconquest, Spaniards were often viewed abroad as heretics and "poor Christians" due to centuries of coexistence among Catholics, Jews, and Muslims. Anti-Jewish stereotypes, used to justify expulsions and seizures in Europe, were applied to Spaniards, portraying them as "greedy, gold-thirsty, cruel, and violent" due to supposed Jewish and Moorish ancestry. Foreign travelers’ accounts described the tolerant atmosphere in Isabella and Ferdinand’s court, noting that Moors and Jews faced no forced conversions. Historical disputes between the Pope and Iberian kingdoms—over the Inquisition in Castile and southern Italy in Aragon—further cemented this heretical image. Such perceptions risked political and military repercussions, especially as the union of two powerful kingdoms could provoke fear and aggression from neighbors, amplified by Ottoman expansion in the Mediterranean. The Inquisition’s establishment and the expulsion of Jews and Moriscos may have aimed to reshape Spain’s image and alleviate international concerns about its loyalties. In this view, the Inquisition served as a tool for the Catholic Monarchs to pivot from African alliances toward Europe, aligning Spain’s identity and reputation with European norms and improving papal relations.

=== Ottoman scare hypothesis ===
Suspected Morisco plots to aid a potential Ottoman invasion simplified the decision to establish the Inquisition. During this period, the Ottoman Empire rapidly expanded, while the Aragonese Mediterranean Empire struggled with debt and war exhaustion. Ferdinand feared an inability to repel an Ottoman attack on Spain’s shores, particularly with internal support from Moriscos. Regions with the highest Morisco populations were near common naval routes between Spain and Africa. Weakened Aragonese naval power, noble resentment toward the monarchs, Portugal’s claims on Castile, and Catholic monarchs’ shift from African alliances toward Europe fueled fears of a second Muslim invasion and occupation. This concern likely drove the expulsion of Moriscos, who might support such an invasion, and Jews, who lacked strong religious opposition to it. The Inquisition may have been created to enforce these measures and eliminate false converts posing espionage risks. Supporting this view, the military logic aligns with early attempts by the Monarchs to pursue peaceful conversion, followed by a shift to the Inquisition and expulsion edicts when these efforts failed. The conquest of Naples by Gran Capitán reflects Spain’s interest in Mediterranean expansion, likely creating tensions with the Ottoman Empire and African nations. Thus, the Inquisition may have served as a permanent body to prevent citizens with religious ties to rival African nations, as conflict with them became inevitable.

=== Renaissance hypothesis ===
The Spanish Inquisition was consistent with important political philosophers of the Florentine School (Guicciardini, Pico della Mirandola, Machiavelli, Segni, Pitti, Nardi, Varchi, etc.), with whom the kings were known to have contact. Both Guicciardini and Machiavelli defended the importance of centralization and unification to create a strong state capable of repelling foreign invasions and warned of the dangers of excessive social uniformity to the creativity and innovation of a nation. Machiavelli considered piety and morals desirable for the subjects but not for the ruler, for whom they were a tool to unify its subjects. He warned of the nefarious influence of a corrupt church in the creation of a selfish population and middle nobility, which had fragmented the peninsula and made it unable to resist either France or Aragon. German philosophers at the time were advocating the importance of a vassal sharing the religion of their lord.

The Inquisition may have been the result of adopting these ideas. The use of religion as a unifying factor across a land that otherwise remained diverse with different laws in other respects, and the creation of the Inquisition to enforce laws across it, maintain religious unity, and control the local elites were generally consistent with those teachings.

Alternatively, the enforcement of Catholicism across the realms might be the result of simple religious devotion by the monarchs. Scholarship on the expulsion of the Jews leans towards putting religious motivations as the main cause. However, considering the reports on Ferdinand's political persona, that is unlikely the only reason. Machiavelli, among others, described Ferdinand as a man who didn't know the meaning of piety, but who made political use of it and would have achieved little if he had known it. He became Machiavelli's main inspiration while writing The Prince.

=== Checking the Pope hypothesis ===
During the Middle Ages, the Catholic Church sought political control over Christian Spain, claiming ownership of lands reconquered from non-Christians—a claim that Castile rejected but Aragon and Portugal accepted. The papacy partially succeeded in suppressing the Mozarabic Rite in Iberia and played a key role in Aragon’s loss of Roussillon. Its interference in Aragon’s control over southern Italy was even more pronounced. The Catholic Monarchs faced challenges from Pope Paul II, who advocated absolute Church authority over monarchs. Carrillo, an opponent, often cited Spain’s "mixed blood" to justify intervention. The papacy’s rivalry with European monarchs, which Rome had won in France, persisted through the High Middle Ages.

Church legitimacy was vital for Isabella and Ferdinand, particularly Isabella, to maintain power. The Spanish Inquisition may have been a strategic concession to papal demands regarding Spain’s religious diversity. Simultaneously, it prevented the Pope from imposing a second Inquisition under his control, creating a tool to limit Rome’s influence in Spain. Unlike other Inquisitions, the Spanish Inquisition was led by the Spanish monarchs instead of the Pope, following the granting of the papal bull. It enforced royal laws on religion and private matters, operating independently of Rome. This autonomy allowed it to investigate, prosecute, and convict clergy for corruption or treason against the crown—potentially on the Pope’s behalf—without papal interference. Despite its "Holy" title, the Inquisition included secular lawyers alongside clergy. If intended to curb Rome’s influence, it was a highly effective bureaucratic body, wielding nominal Church authority to prosecute clergy while answering solely to the Spanish Crown. The Pope retained some influence over Spanish monarchs, but only indirectly through the kings, limiting direct control.

=== Other ===
Other hypotheses that circulate regarding the Spanish Inquisition's creation include:

==== Economic hypothesis ====
One penalty that the Inquisition could enforce on convicts was converting their property into Crown property. Thus, the Inquisition helped to finance the crown. Even if not the primary reason (the monarchs could confiscate property through edicts), but it may have helped sustain the Inquisition over time. This hypothesis notes the tendency of the Inquisition to operate in large and wealthy cities and is favoured by those who consider that most of those prosecuted were innocent. Bergenroth, editor and translator of the Spanish state papers from 1485 to 1509, believed that revenue was the incentive for Ferdinand and Isabella's decision to invite the Inquisition into Spain. Other authors point out that both monarchs were aware of the economic consequences of a decrease in population.

==== Intolerance and racism ====
This idea is usually advanced to explain expulsion of the Jews or the Moriscos. Some authors deny that Spain was much different from the rest of Europe regarding tolerance and openmindedness while others argue that it used to be different, but gradually came to resemble the rest of medieval Europe. It explains the creation of the Inquisition as the result of the same forces as those that caused the creation of similar entities across Europe. This view may help explain the similarities between the Spanish Inquisition and those elsewhere, but does not account for its many unique characteristics, including its timing and duration.

== Sources ==
- García Cárcel, Ricardo (1976). Orígenes de la Inquisición Española. El Tribunal de Valencia, 1478–1530. Barcelona.
- Green, Toby (2007). Inquisition : the reign of fear. New York: Thomas Books. ISBN 978-0-312-53724-1.
- Kamen, Henry (1998). The Spanish Inquisition: a Historical Revision. Yale University Press. ISBN 978-0-300-07522-9.
- Pérez, Joseph (2005). The Spanish Inquisition: A History. Yale University Press.
- Peters, Edward (1988). Inquisition. New York & London: Free Press Collier Macmillan. ISBN 978-0029249802.
