= Francisco López =

Francisco López or Francisco Lopez may refer to:

== Arts ==
- Francisco López (16th-century painter), Spanish Renaissance painter
- Francisco López (17th-century painter) (1554–1629), Spanish Renaissance painter
- Francisco López Capillas (c. 1615–1673), Mexican composer
- Francisco López Caro (1578–1662), Spanish Baroque painter
- Francisco Lopez y Palomino (fl. 1759) was a Spanish painter
- Francisco López Merino (1904–1928), Argentine poet
- Francisco López (musician) (born 1964), Spanish avant-garde musician
- Francisco López Sanz (1896–1977), Spanish publisher and writer
- Francisco López de Villalobos (1473–1549), Spanish converso physician and author
- Francisco López de Zárate (1580–1658), Spanish poet and playwright
- Francisco Benjamín López Toledo (1940–2019), known as Francisco Toledo, Mexican Zapotec painter
- Francisco Delgado López (active since 1997), Spanish costume designer who usually goes under the name Paco Delgado
- Francisco Solano López (comics) (1928–2011), Argentine comics artist

== Politicians ==
- Francisco López Álvarez, more known as Patxi López (born 1959), Spanish politician, president of the Basque Autonomous Community
- Francisco López López (born 1959), Puerto Rican politician and mayor of Barranquitas
- Francisco López Mena (born 1953), Mexican politician from Quintana Roo
- Francisco Solano López (1827–1870), president of Paraguay

== Sportspeople ==
=== Football ===
- Pinula Contreras (Francisco López Contreras, born 1934), Guatemalan footballer
- Francisco López (footballer, born 1950) (Francisco Javier López), Spanish footballer
- Francisco López (footballer, born 1962) (Francisco Javier López), Spanish football player
- Paco López (footballer) (Francisco José López, born 1967), Spanish football player and manager

=== Other sports ===
- Francisco López (canoeist) (born 1965), Spanish sprint canoer
- Francisco López Contardo (born 1975), Chilean motorcycle rider
- Francisco López (Chilean hurdler) (born 1995), see 2014 World Junior Championships in Athletics – Men's 110 metres hurdles
- Francisco López (handballer) (born 1949), Spanish handball player
- Francisco López (Spanish hurdler) (born 1995), see 2014 World Junior Championships in Athletics – Men's 110 metres hurdles
- Francisco López (table tennis) (born 1962), Venezuelan table tennis player

== Other people ==
- Francisco López de Gómara (c. 1511–c. 1566), Spanish historian at Seville
- Francisco López (died 1627), Augustinian friar who translated the Doctrina Christiana and started a dictionary in Ilocano, see Ilocano literature
- Francisco López Osornio (ca. 1645 – ca. 1700), Spanish colonial landowner and military man
- Francisco López de Osornio Merlo (1681–1756), Spanish military leader and colonial landowner
- Francisco López de Zúñiga, 2nd Marquess of Baides (1599–1655), Spanish soldier who served as Royal Governor of Chile, 1639–1646
- Francisco Lopez (Passions), a soap opera character from the U.S. daytime drama Passions

== See also ==
- Francisco Lopes (born 1955), Portuguese politician
- Francisco Craveiro Lopes (1894–1964), president of Portugal, 1951–1958
- Francisco Javier López (disambiguation)
