= Osornio =

Osornio is a surname. Notable people with the surname include:

- Agustina López de Osornio (1769–1845), Argentine noblewoman
- Arturo Osornio (born 1953), Mexican politician
- Clemente López de Osornio (1720–1783), Spanish military leader
- Enrique Cornelio Osornio Martínez de los Ríos (1868–1945), Mexican politician and general
- Erick Osornio (born 1983), Mexican taekwondo practitioner
- Francisco López Osornio (c.1640-1700s), Spanish military leader
- Francisco López de Osornio Merlo (1681–1750), Spanish military leader and landowner
- Ramón López de Osornio (1685–1750), Spanish landowner, who served as Captain of provincial militias of Buenos Aires
- Saturnino Osornio (1896–1976), Mexican governor of Querétaro from 1931 to 1934
