= Casimiro Alegre =

Argentine politician and military man

Capitán Casimiro Alegre
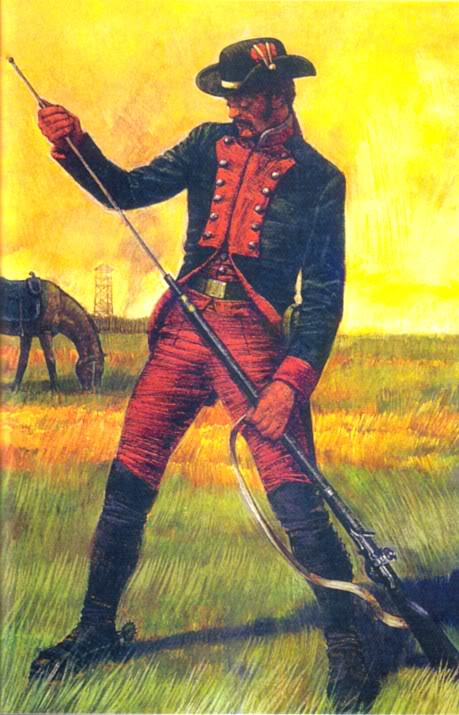
- Image of Casimiro

Alcalde of Magdalena
- In office 1780–1781
- Preceded by: Joaquín Ortega
- Succeeded by: Pedro Nolasco Arroyo

Alcalde of La Matanza In office 1790-1791 1795-1796
- Preceded by: ?
- Succeeded by: ?

Alcalde of San Vicente
- In office ?–?
- Preceded by: ?
- Succeeded by: ?

Personal details
- Born: Casimiro Alegre y Sosa; 1741 Buenos Aires, Argentina
- Died: 1825 (aged 83–84) Buenos Aires, Argentina
- Resting place: Cementerio del norte
- Party: Federalist
- Spouse: Anastacia Espinosa y Ramírez
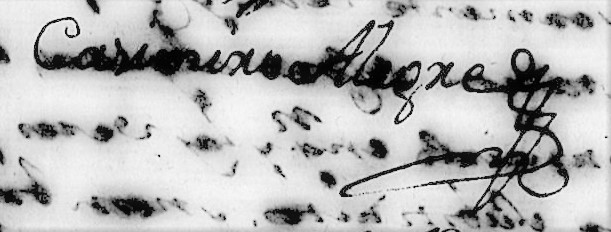
- Signature

Military service
- Allegiance: (Spanish Empire) Spain — until 1810 (Argentina) United Provinces of the River Plate
- Branch/service: Spanish Army; Argentine Army
- Years of service: 1755–1817
- Rank: Sergeant major
- Unit: Guardia of Juncal (1771–77)
- Commands: 1° Compañía Milicias Urbanas of San Vicente
- Battles/wars: First Cevallos expedition Campaign of the Desert; British invasions of the River Plate

Casimiro Alegre (1741–1825) was an Argentine politician and military man, who had an outstanding participation during the Viceroyalty of Peru and Viceroyalty of the Río de la Plata, serving as alcalde of campaign in the Province of Buenos Aires, and as Commandant in the Regiment of Blandengues of the Frontier of Buenos Aires.

He participated in military expeditions against the Indians prior to the Desert Campaign of the 1830s. He was one of the landowners of Buenos Aires who supported the Independence movements of Argentina.

== Militia career ==
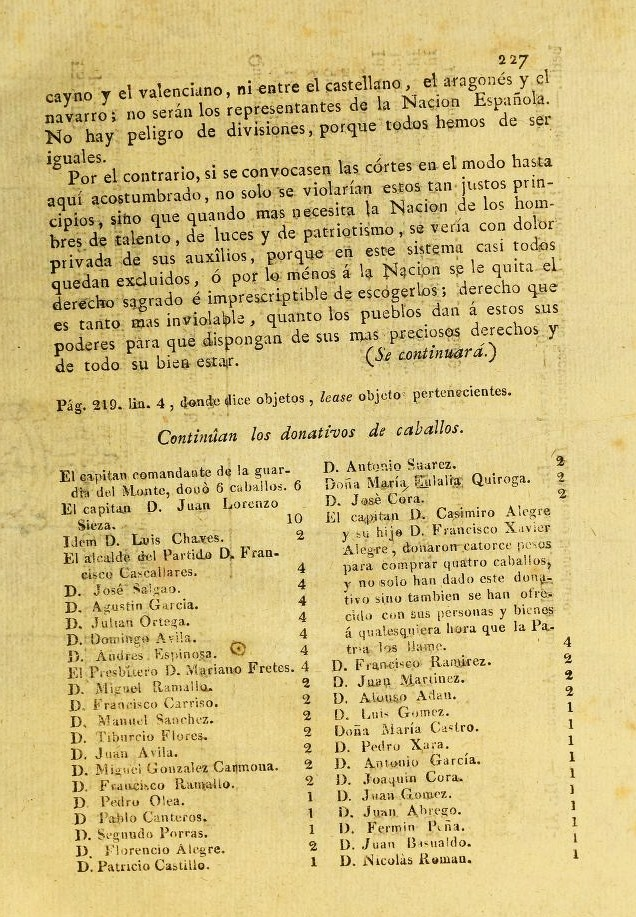
Casimiro Alegre in the Gazeta de Buenos Ayres of September 6, 1810.

He was born in Buenos Aires, the son of Matías Alegre and Francisca de Sosa, belonging to a Creole family from Asunción. He possibly did his elementary studies in the city of Buenos Aires, and began his military career at the age of nineteen or twenty, serving in the Guardia del Juncal, a fortress built in the town of Cañuelas to prevent the advance of the Indians.

Most of his services to the Ejército Español were related to militia expeditions in the northern and southern areas of the Province of Buenos Aires. In 1777, Casimiro Alegre led a caravan of fifteen carts, which were to transport three hundred wooden posts for the repair the Fort of Monte, being also the responsible for the construction of the barracks on the shores of Laguna of Monte, an area continually harassed by indigenous incursions.

In 1779, he was promoted to Lieutenant of militia and appointed Captain in 1780. That same year he was appointed alcalde of the campaign in the town of Magdalena. He lent his oath on February 12, 1780, before the dean councilor of the Cabildo de Buenos Aires Don Gregorio Ramos Mexía.

As mayor and captain of militias he participated in several military campaigns against the indigenous incursions in the Province of Buenos Aires. In 1780 the Consejo de guerra of Buenos Aires had appointed to Captain Casimiro Alegre, to lead one of the punitive expeditions against the "unfaithful Indians", who carried out a massacre against the inhabitants of the town of Luján in the night of August 27 of that same year. The militiamen of these campaigns were properly equipped with flintlocks, carbines, pistols, lances and sabers.

He also served in the expeditions against the Portuguese in the Banda Oriental del Uruguay, having an active participation during the Spanish–Portuguese War.

Towards the end of 1770 he had a social, political and economic rise in the colonial bureaucracy of the Río de la Plata. He served as alcalde de la hermandad in the towns of Magdalena, La Matanza (three times-1790, 1795, 1796) and San Vicente, which also covered the current territory of Almirante Brown. He was entrusted to carry various military and political missions, serving also in the assistance of the first settlers of the province of Buenos Aires.

In 1793 he served in the area of Partido de la Costa (San Isidro, Buenos Aires), serving as a Militia Captain in surveillance of the coastal areas of that town. In 1795 he was commissioned by the Viceroy, Pedro Melo de Portugal to make the appraisal of a land located in the current territory of Marcos Paz.

His work as mayor of the brotherhood consisted mainly in the control of the rural areas of the Province of Buenos Aires, also exercising administrative and judicial tasks, and the persecution of the bandits.

Like most of the inhabitants of Buenos Aires, he participated in the defense and reconquest of Buenos Aires against the English. He possibly served in the Regimiento Voluntarios de Caballería de la Frontera, formed with volunteers of Buenos Aires province. He also had an active participation in supporting the patriotic forces during the May Revolution and the War of Independence. He and his family had collaborated to buy horses for the First Upper Peru campaign.

He served in the urban militias of the province of Buenos Aires for more than forty years, obtaining his retirement from the Argentine Army on September 17, 1817. He continued to dedicate himself to government tasks until the end of his life. In 1820 he desisted his appointment as mayor of San Vicente, a position that had also been offered to Juan Manuel de Rosas.

The provincial militias were conformed with landowners, officers and soldiers of militias and gauchos, and were initially dedicated to the control of the indigenous attacks in the province of Buenos Aires. Years later these militias participated in the Argentine Civil Wars.

== Family ==
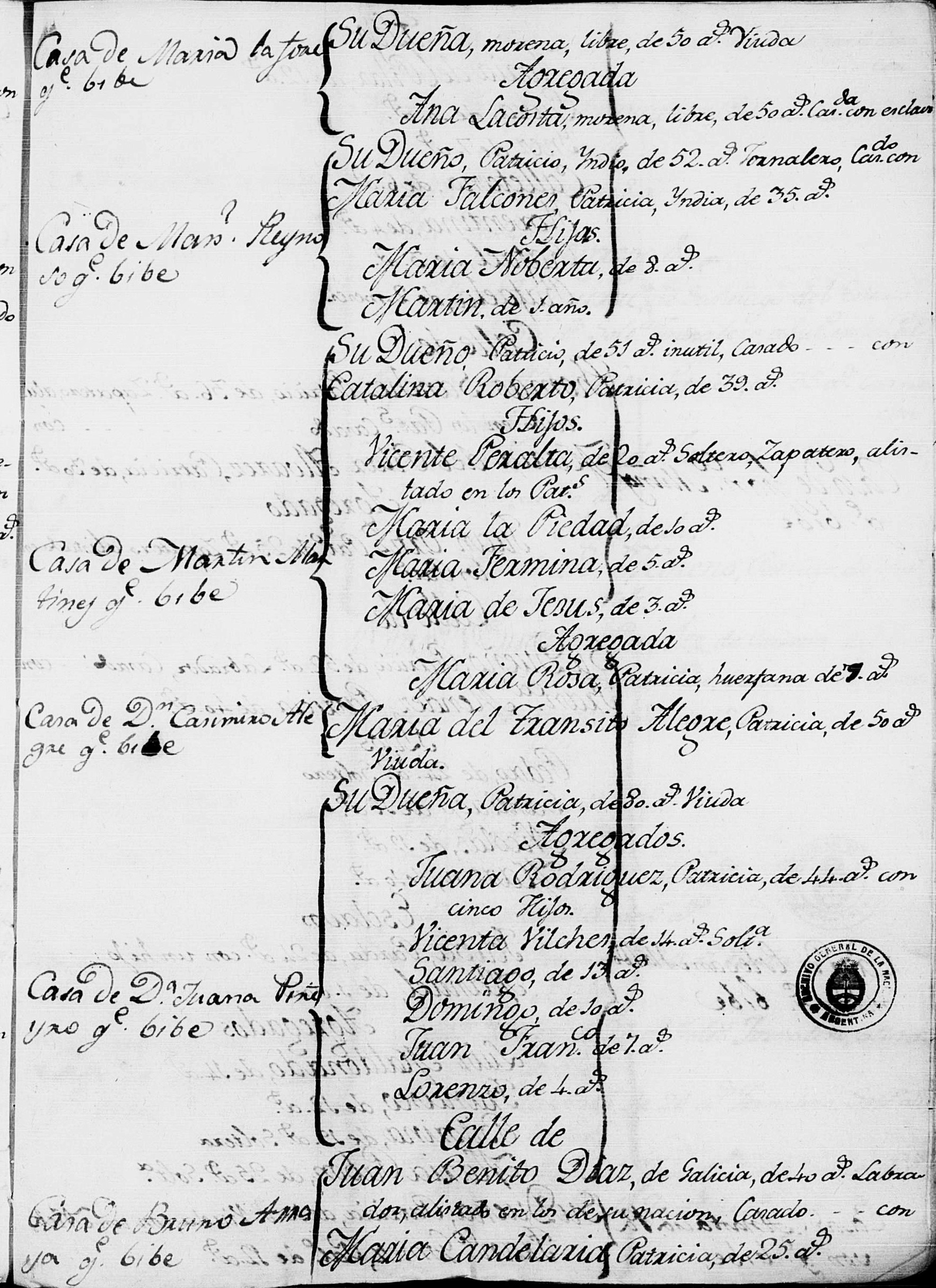
record of the Casimiro Alegre family in the 1807 Census of Buenos Aires

His father Matías Alegre Paredes, was a cattle breeder settled with his wife in the area of Zárate since 1724. Casimiro Alegre was baptized on April 19, 1741, in the Parish San Nicolás de Bari, being his godparents Ramón López de Osornio and Margarita Sosa, a distinguished family of ranchers related to Clemente López de Osornio. He was married to Anastacia Espinosa, daughter of Francisco Antonio Espinosa and Francisca Ramírez, a Creole woman genealogically related to the families of Garay and Peñalba.

His son Francisco Javier Alegre, served as Alférez in the 1° Regimiento de Caballería de la Frontera. He served under the orders of Martín Rodríguez, taking an active part in the campaigns against the Indians in 1820 and 1824. In 1837 his son Saturnino Alegre Espinosa, sold a plot of 225 hectares to its neighbor Hannah Brocksopp, a female landowner of English origin.

Casimiro Alegre y Sosa was a direct descendant of Luis Alegre and Dionis de Lys, two distinguished Flemish conquerors and expeditionaries in the service of the Spanish Crown, who arrived in the Río de la Plata in the expedition of Pedro de Mendoza. His many descendants include Juan Bourré de Andrade, a lieutenant colonel of the Argentine Army who participated in the Conquest of the Desert, and Pablo Alegre Martínez, a Major of the Argentine Army who participated in the Battle of Lomas Valentinas, during the Paraguayan War.
