= Francisco de Paredes =

Spanish conquistador

Personal details
- Born: 1512 Burgos, Castile and León, Spain
- Died: c. 1560 Asunción, Viceroyalty of Peru
- Occupation: Politician explorer
- Profession: militia

Military service
- Allegiance: Spanish Empire
- Branch/service: Spanish Army
- Rank: Conquistador

Francisco de Paredes (1512 – c. 1560) was a Spanish conquistador, who attended the founding of Buenos Aires and Asunción.

He was born in Burgos, Spain, the son of Andrés de Paredes and Leonor del Río, belonging to a distinguished Castilian family from Burgos. He arrived in the Río de la Plata in the expedition of Pedro de Mendoza, with his brother, the canon Lesmes de Paredes.

Francisco de Paredes was the ancestor of Potenciana de Paredes, a paternal grandmother of Casimiro Alegre, a prominent Spanish colonial official of Buenos Aires.
