= Zenta =

Zenta may refers to:

- Battle of Zenta, a battle on 11 September 1697 in which the Ottoman Empire suffered an ultimate defeat

- Senta, a municipality in Vojvodina, Serbia, known as Zenta in other languages, from which the battle took its name

- Martyrs of Zenta: Roman Catholic priests Pedro Ortiz de Zárate (1622–1683) and Giovanni Antonio Solinas (1643–1683)
- Zenta-class cruiser, class of warships of Austro-Hungarian Navy
  - SMS Zenta, the lead ship of the class
- Zenta Gastl-Kopp (born 1933), German hurdle runner
- Zenta Mauriņa (1897–1978), Latvian writer
