= Nowarra =

Nowarra is a German surname. Notable people with the surname include:

- Heinz Nowarra (1897–1945), German chess player
- Waltraud Nowarra (1940–2007), German chess player

== See also ==
- Nowara
