= Franco López =

Franco López may refer to:

- Franco López (Argentine footballer) (born 1998)
- Franco López (Uruguayan footballer) (born 1992)

== See also ==
- Francisco López
