= Juan de Garay =

Spanish conquistador

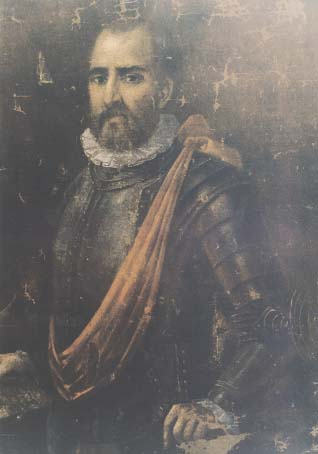

Governor of the Río de la Plata and Paraguay (1578-1583) Lieutenant Governor of Asunción (1577-1578) Lieutenant Governor of Santa Fe (1574-1576).
- Monarch: Philip II

Personal details
- Born: 1528 Biscay, Spain
- Died: 1583 (aged 54–55) Santa Fe, Viceroyalty of Peru
- Spouse(s): Isabel de Becerra; Juana de Espindola y Palomino
- Children: Juan de Garay y Becerra
- Occupation: Politician

Juan de Garay (1528–1583) was a Spanish conquistador. He served under the Crown of Castille, in the Viceroyalty of Peru. He was governor of Asunción (present day Paraguay) and founded a number of cities in present-day Argentina, many near the Paraná River area, including the second foundation of Buenos Aires, in 1580.

== Biography ==
Garay's birthplace is disputed. Some say it was in the city of Junta de Villalba de Losa in Castile, while others argue he was born in the area of Orduña (Basque Country). There's no birth certification whatsoever, though Juan De Garay regarded himself as somebody from Biscay (a region from the Basque Country).

In 1543 he sailed to Peru with his uncle Pedro de Zárate in Viceroy Blasco Núñez Vela's first expedition. In 1561 he took part in the foundation of Santa Cruz de la Sierra. In 1568 he moved to Asunción where he attained political stature. The governor of Asunción sent him in April 1573, with a company of eighty men, on an expedition to the Paraná River, during which he founded the city of Santa Fe de la Vera Cruz. In 1576 he was appointed governor of Asunción. As governor, his primary objective was to foster peace and harmony by introducing justice and civilization among the indigenous populations. In pursuit of these aims, he took the initiative to establish Indian villages and implemented local governance systems.

In 1580, having attained the rank of Capitan General of the Viceroyalty, he re-founded the city on the banks of the Río de la Plata, which was first established by Pedro de Mendoza in 1536 under the name of Nuestra Señora del Buen Ayre, but was later destroyed by the natives. Garay founded Buenos Aires a second time on 11 June 1580. He landed on the riverbank in the location of Plaza de Mayo, calling the city Ciudad de la Trinidad and its port Santa Maria de Buenos Ayres. Buenos Aires would become the main city in the Paraná basin and its most important port.

Later, he went on an expedition in search for the legendary City of the Caesars (1581-1582).

Juan de Garay died near the Río de la Plata while travelling from Buenos Aires to Santa Fe on 20 March 1583; his group of 40 men, a Franciscan priest and a few women, entered an unknown lagoon and decided to spend the night on the banks of the Carcarañá River, near the ancient Sancti Spíritus Fort. The group was ambushed by Querandíes natives who killed Garay, the priest, a woman, and twelve of the soldiers.

Garay had a daughter, Jerónima de Contreras, who married Hernando Arias de Saavedra, the governor of Rio de la Plata.

In the oldest part of the town of Garay in Biscay is located a palace-baserri named Garatikua and built by Juan de Garay. In the 19th century, it was called "Garay-Goitia".

== Family ==
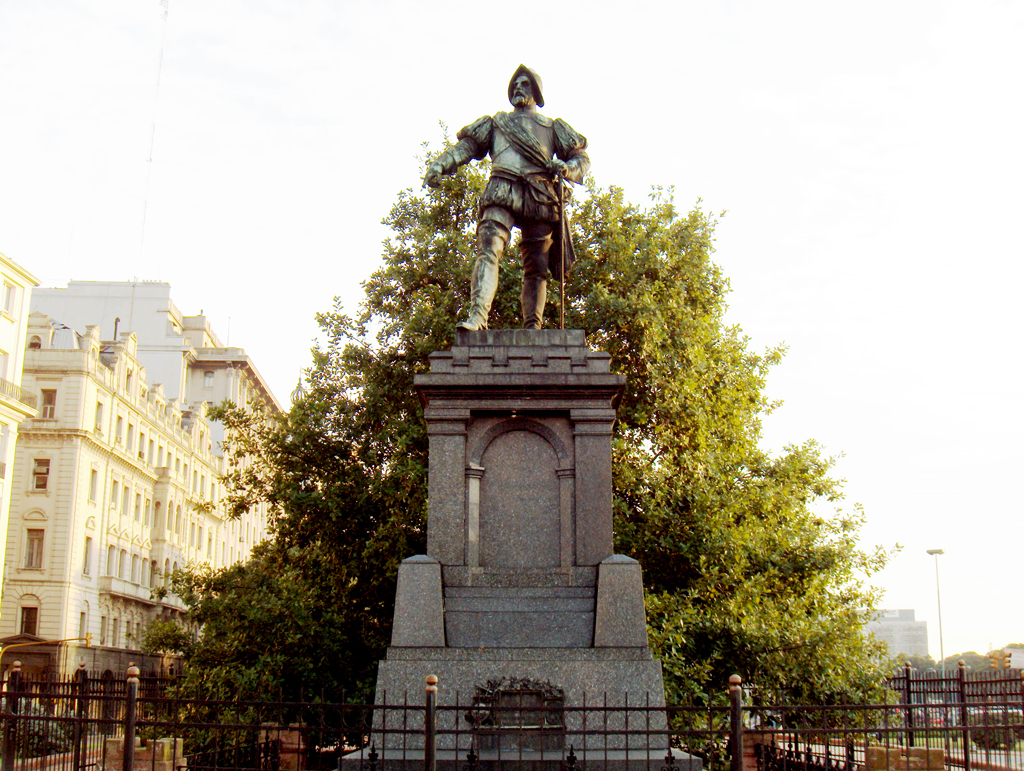
Monument to Juan de Garay

According to García Carraffa, the Garay's coat of arms (gules with rampant lion in gold with a silver banner) indicates an origin from the noble Garay Family of Tudela (Navarra), already mentioned in the thirteenth century. Juan de Garay as a Biscayan had the title of knight, a title the "Fueros" granted to all the Vizcayans. The family had a certain economic and cultural level, it should be kept in mind that his uncle was appointed Judge and "Alcalde Mayor" of Segovia and his cousin attended the University of Salamanca.

Juan joined the family of his uncle that was made by Pedro Ortiz de Zárate, his wife Catalina Uribe and Salazar and his cousins: Pedro Ortiz de Zárate, Ana Salazar and the youngest of the brothers Francisco Uribe. The three children bear different surnames, only the firstborn retains that of the father, while the others adopt the mother's surname (which was very common at the time). He also had a family relationship with Juan Ortiz de Zárate, third "Adelantado" (advanced) of the Rio de la Plata.

== Sources ==
- (in Spanish) On his doubtful birth place
- (in Spanish) Biography
