= Blandengues of the Frontier of Buenos Aires =

Military unit of the Spanish Empire

Regiment of Blandengues of the Frontier of Buenos Aires
- Cuerpo de Blandegues de la Frontera de Buenos Aires
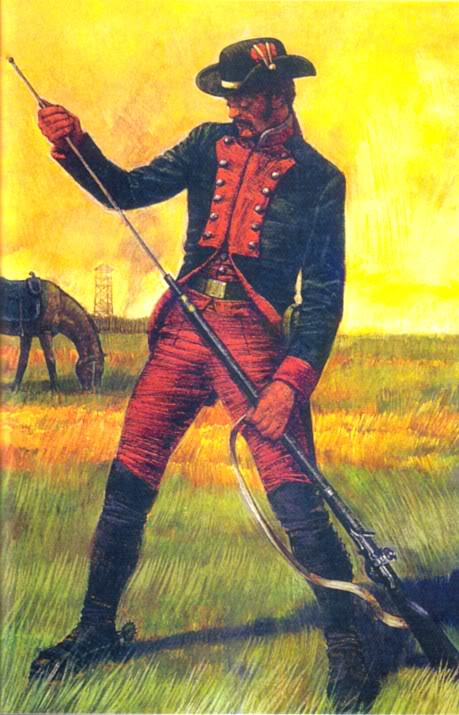
- Blandengue by Johann Moritz Rugendas
- Disbanded: 1810
- Country: Argentina
- Allegiance: Spanish Empire
- Branch: Spanish Army
- Type: cavalry
- Engagements: Guaraní War; First Cevallos expedition Spanish–Portuguese War; British invasions of the River Plate

Regiment of Blandengues of the Frontier of Buenos Aires (Spanish: Cuerpo de Blandengues de la Frontera de Buenos Aires) was a military unit of the Spanish Empire.

== History ==
This military unit was created during the reign of Ferdinand VI of Spain, and had as main objective the defense of the borders of the Province of Buenos Aires against the indigenous incursions. It were composed of military professionals, landowners and Creole militiamen, who were armed with carbines, pistols and spears as general weaponry. In 1752, several companies of the Corps of Blandegues were formed for the persecution of the Malón, among them was "La Valerosa", commanded by the Captain of the Fort of Buenos Aires, Don Juan Miguel de Esparza, and the "La Atrevida", led by Don Juan de Lezica y Torrezuri.

This military unit took an active part during the Guaraní War, and in the expeditions of Pedro de Cevallos in the Banda Oriental.

The Blandengues Regiment of Buenos Aires had an active participation in the construction of the Fortines of the Province of Buenos Aires. In 1777, Lt. Casimiro Alegre led a caravan, destined to supply the elements for the construction of the Fort of San Miguel del Monte.
