= Astorga Cathedral =

Roman Catholic church in Astorga, Spain

- Cathedral of Saint Mary
- Catedral de Santa María
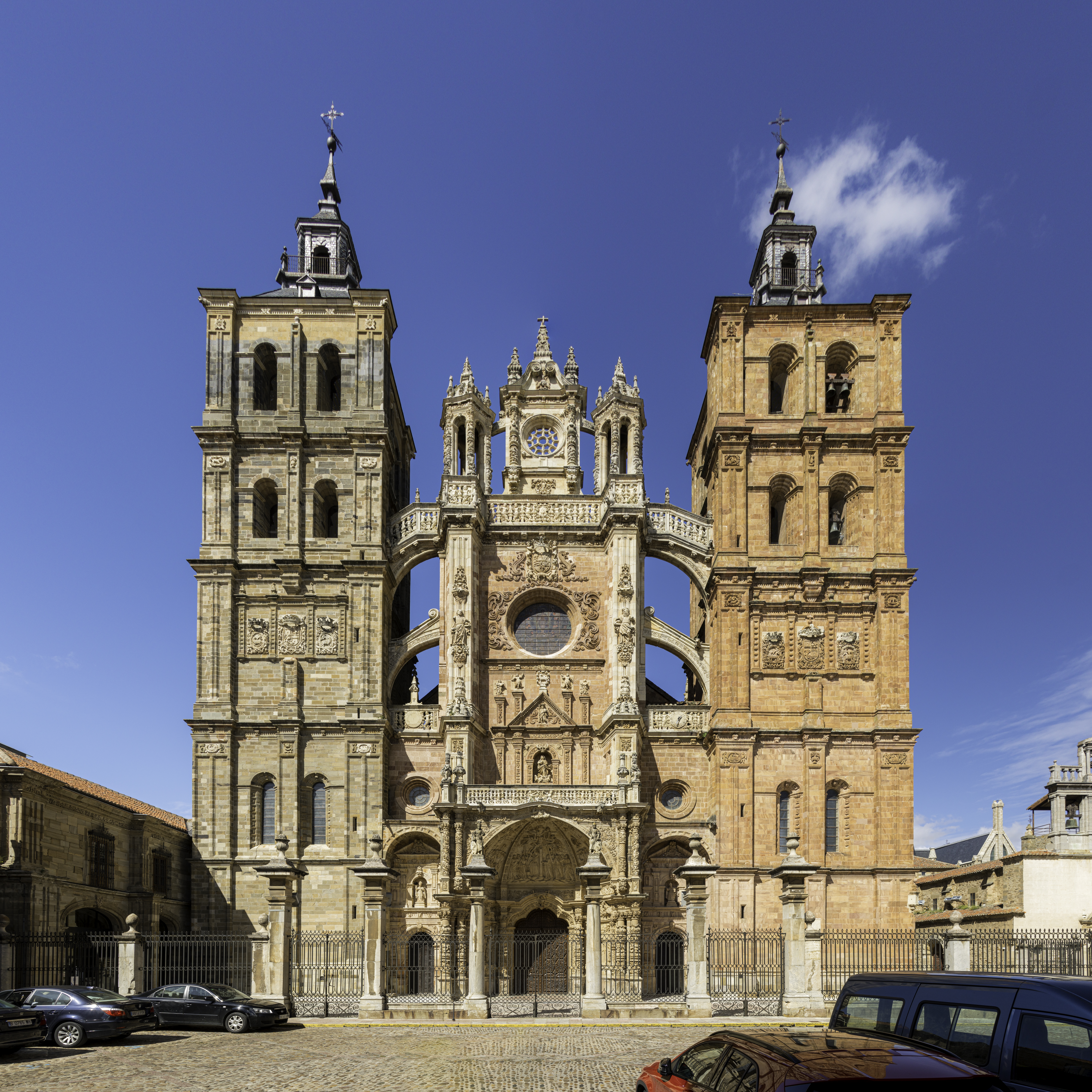
- West façade in 2021.
- Astorga Cathedral
- 42°27′28″N 6°03′25″W
- Location: Astorga
- Address: Plaza de la Catedral
- Country: Spain
- Denomination: Catholic
- Website: catedralastorga.com

History
- Status: Cathedral
- Dedication: Mary, mother of Jesus
- Dedicated: 1069

Architecture
- Architect(s): Juan de Colonia, Rodrigo Gil de Hontañón
- Style: Late Gothic (interior), Baroque (west façade)
- Groundbreaking: 1471

Administration
- Metropolis: Oviedo
- Diocese: Astorga

Clergy
- Bishop: Jesús Fernández González

Spanish Cultural Heritage
- Type: Non-movable
- Criteria: Monument
- Designated: 3 June 1931
- Reference no.: RI-51-0000663

The Cathedral of Saint Mary (Spanish: Catedral de Santa María) is a Roman Catholic church in Astorga, Spain. It was declared a national monument in 1931.

The gothic edifice was begun in 1471, within the same walls of its Romanesque predecessors from the 11th-13th centuries. The construction lasted until the 18th century, thus to its original Gothic style appearance were added elements from later styles, such as the Neo-Classicist cloister (18th century), the Baroque towers, capitals and the façade, and the Renaissance portico. With a rectangular layout, with apsidal chapels, very clear and bright, it has an architectural closeness to German Gothic.

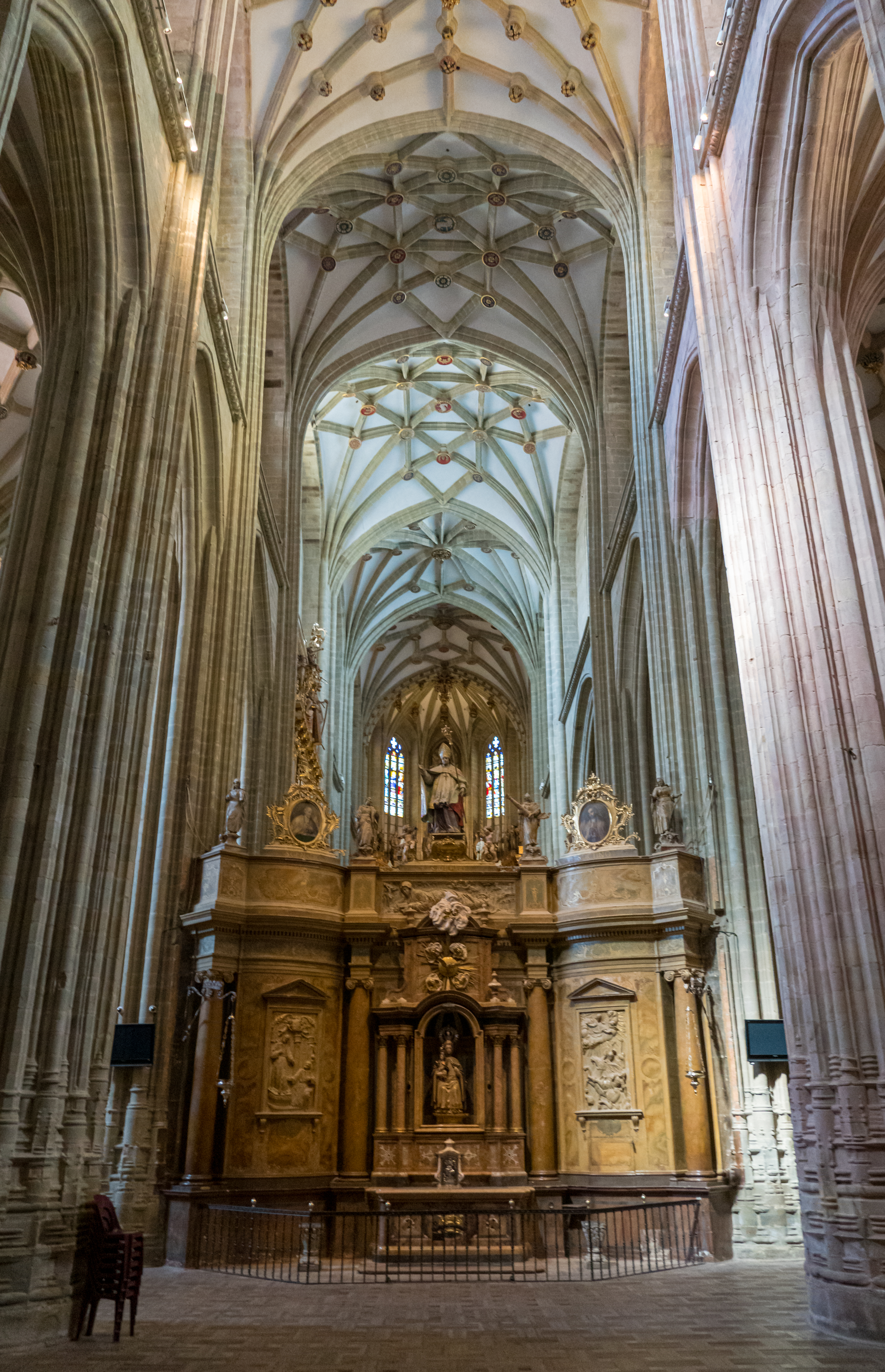
Cathedral interior.

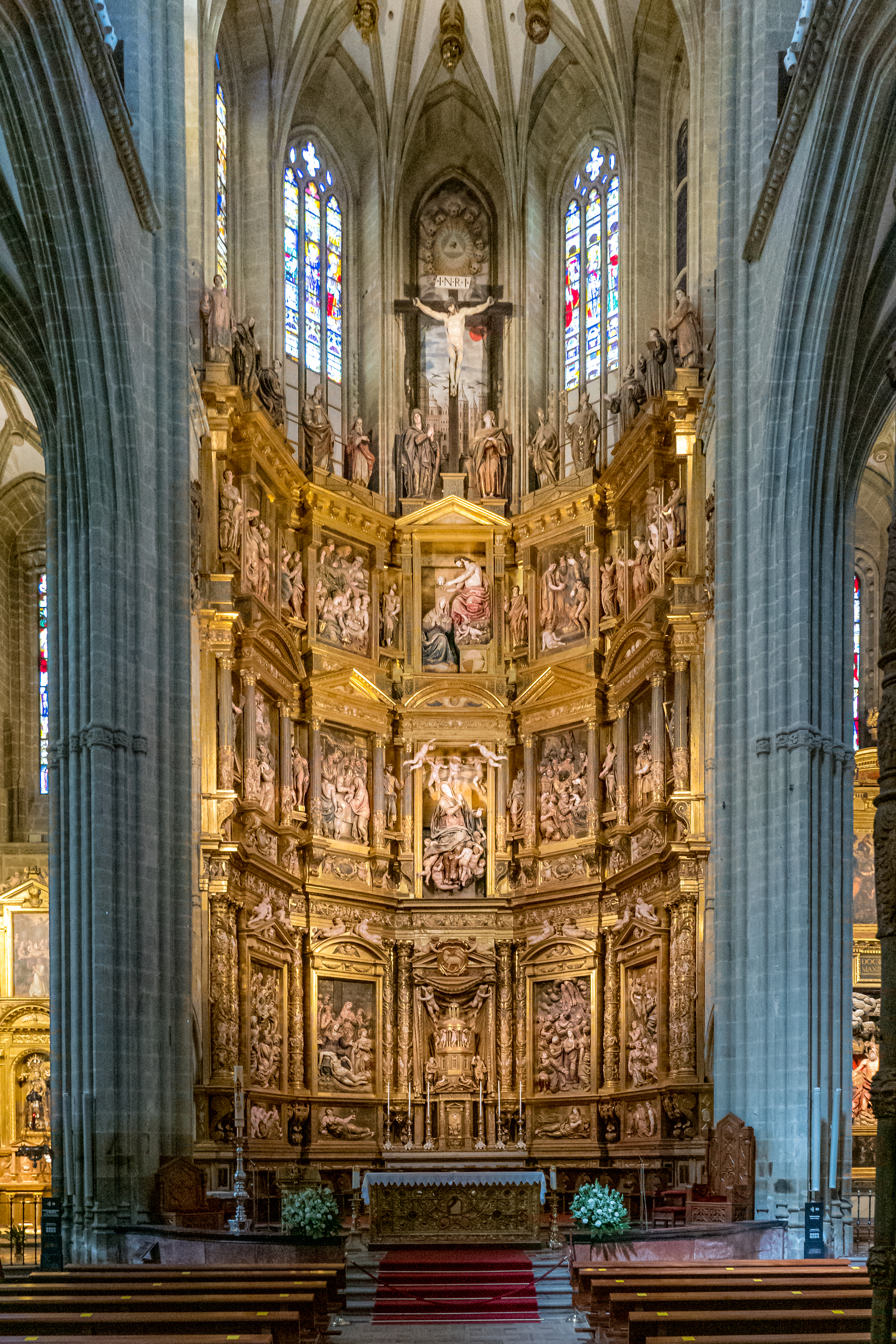
Cathedral altarpiece.

The interior houses numerous artworks, such as the Flemish-Spanish retablo of St. Michael, and the large high altar by Gaspar Becerra (1558), considered a masterwork of the Spanish Renaissance sculpture. Other sculptures include the "Purísima" by Gregorio Fernández (1626), "St. John the Baptist and St. Jerome" by Mateo del Prado (17th century) and the "Christ of the Waters" (14th century).

Next to the church is the Neo-medieval Episcopal Palace, designed by Antoni Gaudí.

== Notable people ==
- Ramón González Barrón (1897-1987), choirmaster at the Astorga Cathedral from 1926-1946.
