= Nowara =

Nowara is a Polish surname. Notable people with the surname include:

- Christopher Schmidt-Nowara (1966–2015), American historian
- Henryk Nowara (1924–2001), Polish boxer
- Józef Nowara (1945–1984), Polish fencer
