= Ramón López de Osornio =

Capitán Ramón López de Osornio

Personal details
- Born: Francisco López de Osornio y Merlo de la Mota; 31 August 1685 Buenos Aires, Argentina
- Died: 1757 (aged 71-72) Buenos Aires, Argentina
- Spouse: Margarita de Sosa
- Children: Paula López de Osornio; Martín López de Osornio; Basilio López de Osornio; Josefa López de Osornio; Isidro López de Osornio; Laureano López de Osornio; Francisca López de Osornio; Gregoria López de Osornio; Josefa López de Osornio
- Occupation: army hacienda
- Profession: military man

Military service
- Allegiance: Spanish Empire
- Branch/service: Spanish Army
- Years of service: c. 1700-1757
- Rank: Captain
- Unit: Fuerte de Buenos Aires
- Commands: Milicias Urbanas de Buenos Aires
- Battles/wars: Expeditions against the Indigenous

Ramón López de Osornio (31 August 1685 – 1757) was a Spanish landowner and military man who served as commander of provincial militias during the colonial period of Argentina. He owned farms in the towns of La Matanza and Magdalena, where he dedicated himself to raising cattle.

He was born in Buenos Aires, the son of Francisco López Osornio and Tomasa Merlo, belonging to an illustrious family of landowners. He was married to Margarita Sosa, belonging to old Creole families of Portuguese roots. His son Juan Basilio López de Osornio was married to Petrona Josefa González de Melo, a distinguished Creole lady, belonging to the families of Melo-Coutinho and Gómez de Saravia-Dominguez de Palermo.

He was the uncle of Clemente López de Osornio, a known military man and landowner killed during an indigenous raid on his ranch, and relative to Casimiro Alegre. a distinguished commander of militias in the towns of Magdalena and San Vicente.
