= Toribio de Peñalva =

Spanish military man

Capitán Toribio de Peñalba Cevallos

Procurator General of Buenos Aires
- In office ?–?
- Monarch: Philip IV
- Preceded by: ?
- Succeeded by: ?

Alcalde de la Hermandad in Buenos Aires Province
- In office 1630–1631
- Monarch: Philip IV
- Preceded by: Antonio de Azpeitia
- Succeeded by: Juan Abalos de Mendoza

Personal details
- Born: c. 1600 Santander, Spain
- Died: c. 1685 Buenos Aires, Argentina
- Resting place: Convent of San Francisco
- Spouse: Ana de Sosa
- Occupation: army politician landowner
- Profession: military man

Military service
- Allegiance: Spanish Empire
- Branch/service: Spanish Army
- Rank: Captain
- Unit: Fuerte de Buenos Aires

Toribio de Peñalva (c.1606-c.1685) was a Spanish military man, who served during the Viceroyalty of Peru as Alcalde de la hermandad and Procurator General of Buenos Aires.

== Biography ==
He was born in Piélagos, Santander, Spain, the son of Toribio de Peñalva and Juliana Cevallos. He arrived in Buenos Aires from Rio de Janeiro, in the company of governor Francisco de Céspedes in 1619. He was married in the city with Ana de Sosa, daughter of Vicente Simoes and Francisca de Souza, belonging to a rich Portuguese family established in Buenos Aires.

His main activity in Buenos Aires was commerce, but he also dedicating himself to the militia and politics, serving as Commander of the garrison, mayor, and attorney general of the city. In 1640, Peñalva received land grants, and purchased the ranch of Amador Báez de Alpoim, a noble neighbor of Buenos Aires.

Toribio de Peñalva was one of the largest landowners in the Province of Buenos Aires during the early years of the colonial period. His sons and descendants were related to the families of Pedro de Roxas y Acevedo and Juan de Garay y Becerra.
