= Miguel Barroso =

Spanish painter

Miguel Barroso (1538–1590) was a Spanish painter.

== Biography ==
Barroso was born at Consuegra in 1538.

According to Palomino, he was a scholar of Gaspare Becerra, and distinguished himself as an architect, as well as a painter. He was employed by Philip II in the Escorial, where he painted, in the principal cloister, the Resurrection, Christ appearing to the Apostles, the Descent of the Holy Ghost, and St. Paul preaching. In 1589, he was made painter to the king. His compositions are copious, and his design correct. Cean Bermudez and Quilliet say that he failed sometimes in vigour and knowledge of chiaroscuro; but that his colour was that of Barocci, and his forms those of Correggio.

He died at the Escorial in 1590.
