= Martyrs of Zenta =

Catholic martyrs

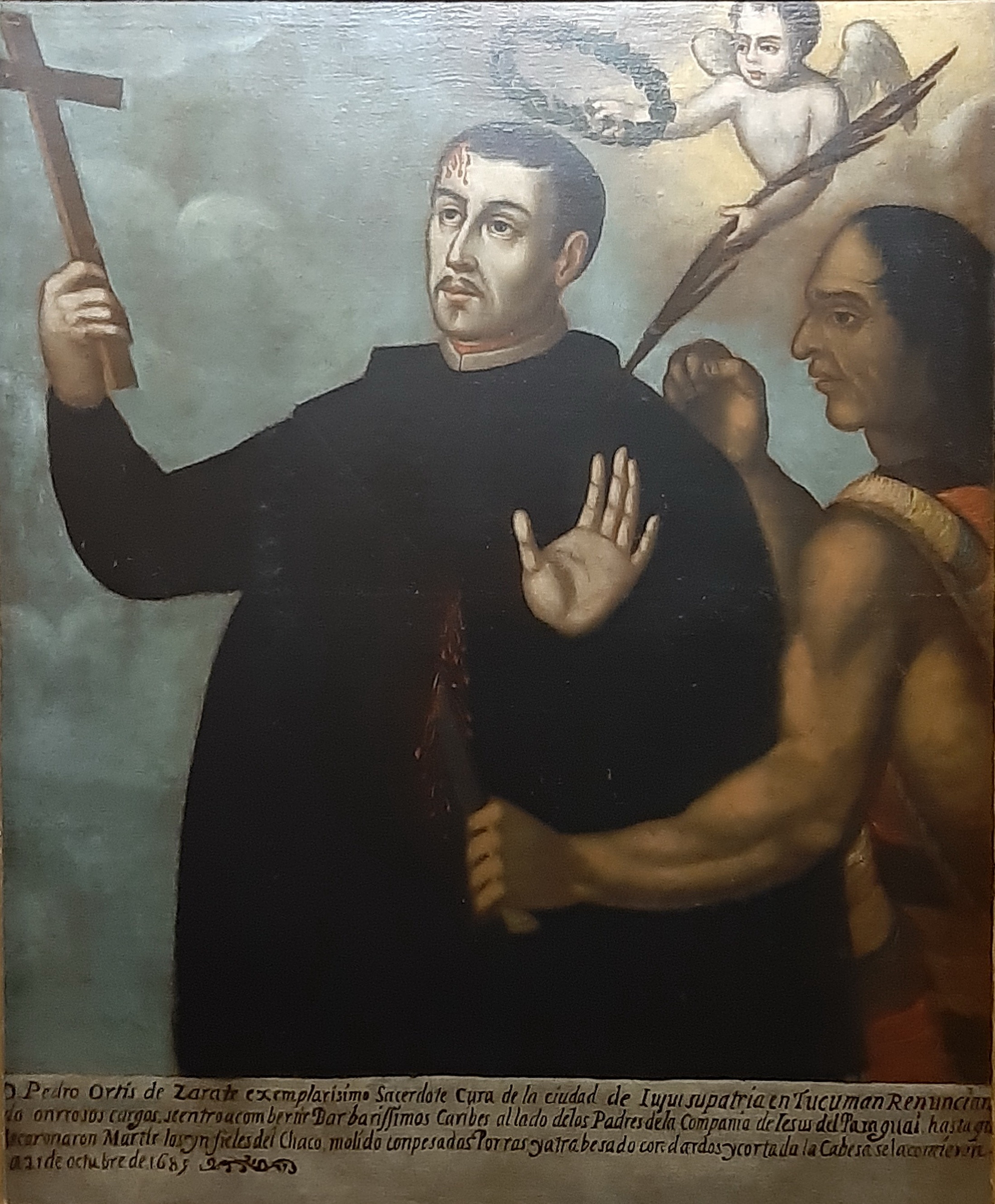
Painting of Zarate getting murdered

On the morning of 27 October 1683 at the San Miguel Fort^{2} in the Zenta Valley, the priests Pedro Ortiz de Zárate and Giovanni Antonio Solinas celebrated Mass and were with eighteen lay people, including some of the converted indigenous peoples, when they were suddenly surrounded and ambushed by almost one hundred and fifty of the natives. The natives, feigning a peaceful approach at the newly constructed chapel of Saint Mary, suddenly attacked and killed them. The group was slain with spears and axes, and their remains were dismembered and their heads severed. The mutilated corpses were discovered the following day by those eyewitnesses who narrated the incident.

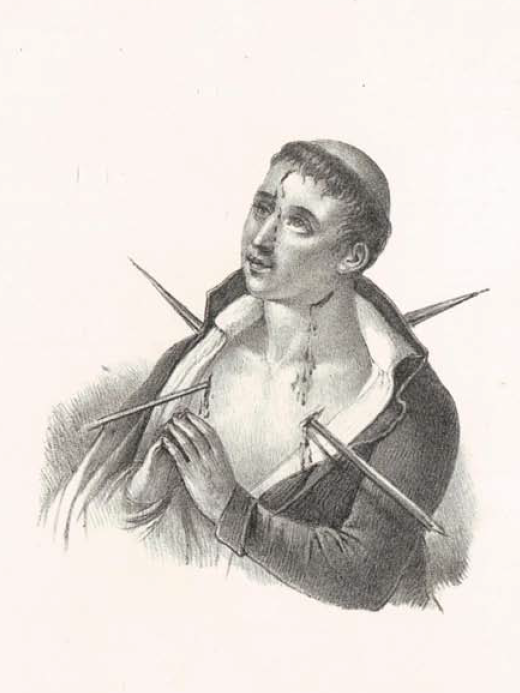
Solinas killed as depicted in an 1837 print.

The deaths of the twenty massacred came at a time when many tribes were waging war against each other and any missionary was often found in the middle of such conflicts since many of their apostolates often created greater problems for some tribes and only heightened existing tensions.

For a little while, until the day of their martyrdom, the priests had been awaiting the return of their priestly companion Diego Ruiz, who was returning from Salta with a convoy of provisions for the group. In the meantime, they had taken the opportunity to make short missionary trips in the surrounding area while they were settled there. However, they had an unexpected visit of around five hundred Tobas and Mocovíes, fully armed and with their bodies totally painted as they used to do for a party or a war. Those people approached desiring better communication and harmony, however, the priests began to believe that the benevolence was faked and that they were more than likely going to die. As the indigenous assailants surrounded the chapel on that 26 October, the following morning would see them kill the entire group after the two priests celebrated Mass and continued their usual work of distributing food and other items as they preached. As the afternoon approached, they were preparing to teach catechism as they were slain with spears, axes, darts, and other weapons before they were beheaded.

However, an alternative account also exists regarding their martyrdom. Around 20 October, Zárate and Solinas headed south with some of the converted and their return to the village took no more than three days at the most. On the way back, they noticed with surprise the very large presence of natives who were fully armed and fully painted, as if ready for a party or for war. While the missionaries were surprised about this, they were still accommodating to the natives, trading food and clothing and other gifts, not really noticing as the natives dispersed and surrounded the Saint Mary chapel. The group of five hundred that committed the massacre consisted of 150 from the Tobas and the rest consisted of five Mocoví leaders and their warriors, with no women or children in sight. The alternative account details that on the night of 26 October, at great personal risk, one of the Mocoví warned the two priests about the betrayal. While both men prepared for their deaths, they doubted as to whether or not the warning was sincere. As the missionaries rang the bells to call people to catechism class, they were already in the midst of teaching when the natives ambushed and attacked them. Also killed were eighteen people, consisting of two Spaniards, a black man, a mulatto, two girls, a native woman and eleven other natives. They were posthumously stripped naked and their heads cut off, with arrows thrust into their bodies.

== Background ==
=== Pedro Ortiz de Zárate ===
Pedro Ortiz de Zárate was born sometime in 1622^{1} in San Salvador in the Jujuy province to parents of Basque origins, Juan Ochoa de Zárate (1573–1638) and Bartolina Sánchez de Garnica (d. 24.02.1633); his mother originally hailed from Santiago del Estero. His sisters were Juana Ortiz de Zárate Garnica, Petronila Ortiz de Zárate Garnica, Ana María Ortiz de Zárate Garnica, and Bartolina Ortiz de Zárate Garnica. He received his baptism from the local curate and vicar Bartolomé Càseres y Godoy. His grandfather and namesake, Pedro de Zàrate, was a very prominent individual in Tucumàn and contributed to the establishment of the city of San Francisco de Alava that eventually became San Salvador and the greater Jujuy province. Despite a solid Catholic education under the Society of Jesus in Jujuy, his father's prominent position in local affairs saw him taught in matters of law and politics.

At the age of seventeen, he married the wealthy noblewoman Petronila de Ibarra Argañarás y Murguía (14.06.1627–1654) on 15 September 1644^{4} and the pair had two children together, Juan Ortiz de Murguía y Zárate and Diego Ortiz de Zàrate Argañaraz (born in 1646). However, the death of his father saw his relatives pressure him to choose a path: the priesthood (which most knew he already felt inclined towards), marriage (to transmit his family name and his family wealth to the next generation), or the priesthood in the event that he would become a widower, with the latter being a fairly common practice in those days. Upon discussing his options with the Jesuit fathers and his spiritual directors, he ultimately chose in favor of marriage. His future wife was the granddaughter of one of the town's founders and the daughter of María de Argañarás y Murguía, who had already been widowed from previous marriages.

He held a range of civil duties and ended up becoming the mayor for his town of San Salvador, a position that he was elected to three times and was elected to for the first time at the age of 22 on the first ballot. However, his mother died on 24 February 1633 and his father died in 1638 while leaving his only son with lands and other personal interests to look after. But he was soon left as a widower in early 1654 and entrusted the care of his two children to his maternal grandmother^{3} since he had the intention to enter the priesthood to pursue the ecclesial life as he felt called to. He discussed his plans with the diocesan bishop, Melchor Maldonado y Saavedra, who arrived in Jujuy on 23 January 1655 for a pastoral visitation, and Zárate commenced his theological and philosophical studies in Córdoba. The very same bishop had already ordained his cousin, Pedro Obando y Zárate, after his own widowhood. What immediately stopped him from immediately pursuing a priestly vocation was that his sons were still very young, and he wanted to wait to see them settled and older first before he pursued his priestly intentions. He was later ordained to the priesthood in mid-1657 in Santiago del Estero by Bishop Maldonado y Saavedra. In his duties as a priest, he dedicated himself to a consistent apostolate that saw him tend to the ill and administer the sacraments to all. Following Maldonado's death in 1661, it was Zárate who was chosen as the apostolic visitor to carry out the next pastoral visitation for all parishes in the diocese.

In late 1657, he was appointed as the curate for the Omaguaca people and later in 1659, he was appointed to serve as the parish priest for Jujuy, remaining there for 24 years, distinguishing himself amongst the people for his ardent commitment to prayer and his attention to divine worship and sacred music in the Mass. Zárate also provided for the construction of chapels and churches through his own personal funds in many of the places that he visited throughout his apostolate. However, he also faced long distances to pay particular attention towards his outreach to the local indigenous populations and to assist the poor and the sick who sometimes lived in remote areas. However, his sole desire was to evangelize the Gospel amongst the Chaco people. He often spoke about it with his bishop, and even wrote to the governor of Tucumàn and the King of Spain Charles II. Eventually, he obtained authorization to commence this mission which would be coordinated in tandem with a mission led by the Society of Jesus who had a similar idea in mind.

In 1670, Ángel de Peredo, a prominent figure in the military and a knight of the Order of Santiago, became the governor for Tucumán. Eventually, his ambitions grew to the point that he was tempted to launch a military campaign to conquer the territory controlled by the Chaco population. However, the military was largely unsuccessful in their efforts due to the difficult terrain and a lack of motivation. Zárate was bitter about the campaign and was frustrated since he grew increasingly concerned for the Chaco people and were worried about what atrocities the military could commit. In order to deter the military campaign, he made repeated requests to instead think about launching a spiritual campaign to help convert the local indigenous populations, despite the turbulent warring between rival tribes. On 17 April 1682, a positive response was issued, and plans for such a mission were drawn up.

In May 1683, he set out alongside two other priests, one being the Italian Jesuit Giovanni Antonio Solinas, and a group that consisted of over seventy people, bidding farewell to his parishioners on 18 October 1862 to prepare for the trip. Solinas and Ruiz joined him on 20 April 1683 before their journey could get underway. The journey was very long and often presented dangers, but the group reached the Zenta Valley and remained there to begin their apostolate amongst the local indigenous tribe. However, on the morning of 27 October 1683, he and Solinas were murdered by the indigenous peoples that belonged to the Tobas and Mocovíes ethnic groups, with some natives and eighteen other people killed alongside them.

=== Giovanni Antonio Solinas ===
Giovanni Antonio Solinas was born in Oliena in the Nuoro province of Sardinia on 15 February 1643 to Giovanni Paolo Solinas and Maria Todde Corbu. He was baptized in the local parish church of Santa Maria just hours after he was born. His parents were devout Christians and entrusted his education to the Society of Jesus who managed a boarding school in Oliena. Attending their school, he began to feel an attraction to the priesthood with an emphasis on the Jesuit charism.

On 13 June 1663, he formally entered the Society of Jesus and spent his novitiate period in Cagliari before he made his initial religious profession on 16 June 1665. Following this, he spent some time as a teacher in various cities, particularly in Sassari, where he commenced his first two years of theological studies after having already completed his philosophical courses. In early 1672, he expressed his desires to enter the missions to his superiors, and told them about his orientation towards tending to the indigenous populations in South America. From Latin America arrived the Jesuit priest Cristoforo Altamirano who had been sent back to Italy to look for prospective candidates to work in the missions in Paraguay, with the intent of bringing back at least 35 if possible. Solinas, whose desire to enter the missions was already very well known by this point, departed on a voyage with three other companions, first reaching Barcelona and then to Madrid before settling in Seville. It was there that he completed his theological studies and on 27 May 1673 was ordained to the priesthood. On 16 September 1673^{5}, he left the port at Cádiz for Latin America.

Solinas arrived in Córdoba on 11 April 1674 and travelled to Buenos Aires in 1675 before relocating to Santa Fé to complete the third and final year of his novitiate. In the listing of missionaries, he was described in his personnel file as "dark, black hair and beard, medium-sized and twenty-eight years old". In the second half of 1678, he commenced his apostolate with the Reducción people in Itapúa in Paraguay, distinguishing himself amongst the locals for his zeal and his hospitable outreach towards the native populations; he also briefly worked in Uruguay. An elderly missionary, Pietro Jimenes de Araya, who was his preaching companion several times, wrote about him from Corrientes to the superior Diego Francesco de Altamirano on 3 April 1679, extolling his virtues and highlighting his tireless work: "Fr. Solinas has worked and is working wonderfully, both in the confessional and from the pulpit. Many days he gives sermons and daily conversations with many examples, teaching the doctrine to children and all categories of the population, and God gave him health and strength, and with them he worked day and night for the good of souls without any distraction in other things". In 1682, he made his solemn religious profession.

After a period of time spent with the Hohomas ethnic group, in 1660 he was appointed as a military chaplain and for the next two years served also as a missionary in other places. In 1681, he was living in Concepción and remained there until 1683 when he would leave for what would be his final mission. When approval came for a mission to the Chaco people in 1682, the Bishop of Tucumán (and the grandnephew of Saint Francisco de Borja) Francisco de Borja y Miguel suggested to allocate the Jesuits to the mission due to their experience in missionary activities. In May 1683, he was assigned to the Chaco mission and would accompany the priest Pedro Ortiz de Zárate and one priest with seventy others in tow. The mission had originally been approved by the Society of Jesus in 1682. The often dangerous journey saw them reach the Tobas and Mocovíes ethnic groups to begin their apostolate amongst them. However, on the morning of 27 October 1683, the two priests and eighteen others, including some of the natives, were brutally slain.

=== Burial ===
Both priests are buried under the altar at the Jesuit church at Calle Caseros y Miter in Salta. In 2021, the Bishop of Jujuy César Daniel Fernández highlighted in a pastoral message that the "remains were buried under the site that the Jujuy Cathedral occupies today in a place that, unfortunately, we cannot identify".

== Beatification ==
The beatification process had its origins at the latest in the 1980s once interest in a cause was raised in the Orán diocese. The official request was made by the Bishop of Orán Mario Antonio Cargnello to the Congregation for the Causes of Saints in Rome on 17 March 1998 to initiate the beatification process for the two slain priests and the other eighteen that died alongside them in the massacre. But the cause hit a major roadblock sometime in 2002 when the other eighteen people were dropped from the cause due to a lack of evidence. The Orán diocese still decided to continue with the cause for the two slain priests and put in the official request that led to the C.C.S. issuing the official "nihil obstat" (no objections) edict on 8 March 2002 that would title both men as a Servant of God and initiate the cause. The Orán diocese opened the diocesan investigation on 1 May 2007 and concluded its business a decade later on 14 November 2016 before sending their findings to the C.C.S. in Rome. The C.C.S. ratified the diocesan process on 8 June 2017 in a decree that asserted that the Orán diocese completed its work and complied with their regulations.

The postulation (the officials managing the cause) compiled and submitted the official "Positio" dossier to the C.C.S. to assess. Historians met to approve the cause after the historical circumstances surrounding the deaths of the two priests was investigated in-depth to determine if their death was in a religious context. Nine theologians later voiced their own approval to the cause while the cardinals and bishops of the C.C.S. issued their own approval on 28 September 2021. Pope Francis signed a decree on 13 October 2021 that confirmed that the two slain priests had been killed "in odium fidei" (in hatred of the faith) and could be beatified without a miracle as is the case in most causes. Cardinal Marcello Semeraro shall preside over the beatification on the pope's behalf in San Ramón de la Nueva Orán on 2 July 2022. The current postulator for this cause is Sr. Isabel Fernández SSFCR.

== Notes ==
^1 Some sources suggest his birthdate to be 29 June 1626.
^2 Some sources suggest that it was named the San Rafael Fort.
^3 Some sources suggest that he entrusted his two sons to his mother-in-law Maria de Arganaràs.
^4 Some sources suggest that he was married on 15 November 1644.
^5 Some sources suggest that Solinas left in January 1674.
