= Gaspar Becerra =

Spanish painter and sculptor

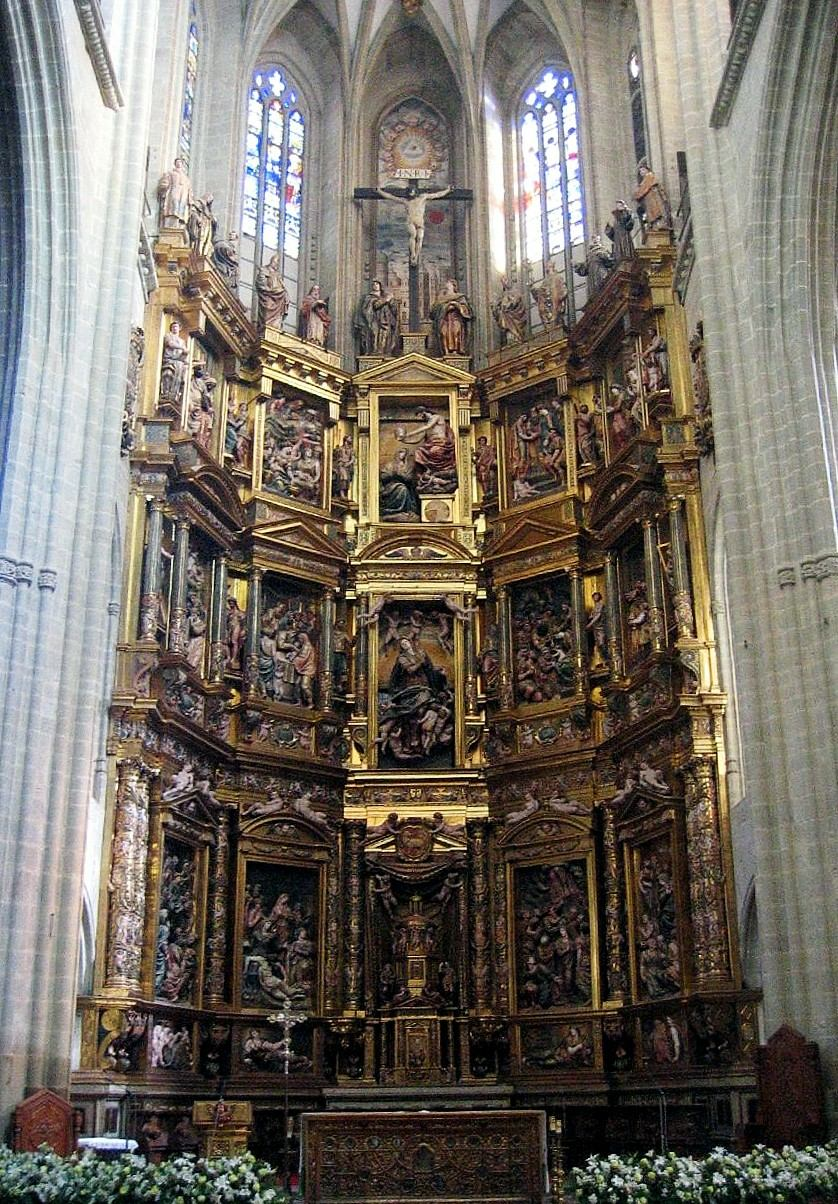
High altar of the Astorga Cathedral

Gaspar Becerra (1520–1568) was a Spanish painter and sculptor of the School of Valladolid.

== Biography ==
He was born at Baeza in the Province of Jaén. He went to Rome in 1545, and studied with Giorgio Vasari, whom he assisted in painting the hall of the Palazzo della Cancelleria. He worked with Daniele da Volterra on the Trinità dei Monti church, where, in 1555, he painted a ‘Nativity’. He also contributed to the anatomical plates of Juan Valverde de Amusco's Historia de la composicion del cuerpo humano (Rome, 1556).

In 1551 Prince Philip of Spain donated funds to commission Becerra to provide a gold tabernacle for San Giacomo degli Spagnoli, the Spanish national church in Rome. This tabernacle may have later been melted down to fashion a new Baroque tabernacle, stolen in 1741.

In 1556 Becerra married Doňa Paula Velasquez and returned to Spain and settled in Zaragoza for a time. He was extensively employed by Philip II, and decorated many of the rooms in the palace at Madrid with frescoes. A ceiling fresco in the Royal Palace of El Pardo displays the "Exploits of Perseus". He also painted altar-pieces for several of the churches, most of which have been destroyed. In 1562 he completed the main retable for the altar of the Convent of Las Descalzas Reales, which was considered his master work. Unfortunately, this was destroyed by fire in 1862.

His fame as a sculptor almost surpassed that as a painter. One of his best works was a magnificent figure of the Virgin Mary, which was destroyed during the French war. He was also commissioned by Elisabeth of Valois for a statue of Our Lady of Solitude at the Order of the Minims' chapel of the convent of Our Lady of Victory. The high altar of Astorga Cathedral (1558) is considered a masterwork of Spanish Renaissance sculpture. He became court painter at Madrid around 1563, and played a prominent part in the establishment of the fine arts in Spain.

Among his pupils were Miguel Barroso, who worked at Toledo in 1585, and, after becoming royal painter in 1589, painted some frescoes in the El Escorial; Bartolomé del Río Bernuís; Francisco López and Jerónimo Vázquez.

Henry Wadsworth Longfellow wrote a poem, "Gaspar Becerra", included in his 1850 collection The Seaside and the Fireside.
