= Francisco López Osornio =

Capitán Francisco López de Osornio

Personal details
- Born: Francisco López de Osornio y Moreno c. 1645 Córdoba, Andalusia, Spain
- Died: c. 1701 Buenos Aires, Argentina
- Spouse: Tomasa Merlo de la Mota
- Children: Francisco López de Osornio; Francisco López de Osornio; Ramón López de Osornio; Pedro López de Osornio; María López de Osornio; Agustina López de Osornio
- Relatives: Clemente López de Osornio (grandson)
- Occupation: army merchant landowner
- Profession: military man

Military service
- Allegiance: Spanish Empire
- Years of service: 1678-c.1700
- Rank: Captain
- Unit: Fuerte de Buenos Aires
- Commands: Milicias Provinciales de Buenos Aires
- Battles/wars: Expeditions against the Indigenous

Francisco López de Osornio (c. 1645 – c. 1700) was a Spanish landowner and military man, who had an active work in the beginnings of the cattle ranch of the Province of Buenos Aires. He was the founder of the López de Osornio family in Argentina, and the maternal ancestor of Juan Manuel de Rosas.

He was born in Andalucia, Spain, the son of Francisco de Osornio and Catalina López Moreno. He carried out his elementary studies possibly in Madrid, and arrived at the Río de la Plata from Spain in the year 1674. He married July 21, 1679 in Buenos Aires to Tomasa Merlo de la Mota, daughter of Alejandro de Merlo and Teresa de la Mota, belonging to distinguished Creole families of Córdoba.
