= Bulletin for Spanish and Portuguese Historical Studies =

- Discipline: History
- Language: English
- Edited by: Andrew H. Lee (New York University)

Publication details
- Frequency: Annual

Standard abbreviations
- ISO 4: Bull. Span. Port. Hist. Stud.

Indexing
- ISSN: 0739-182X

Links
- Journal homepage

The Bulletin for Spanish and Portuguese Historical Studies is a peer review academic journal of the Association for Spanish and Portuguese Historical Studies. The current editor is Andrew H. Lee (New York University).
