= Christopher Schmidt-Nowara =

Historian

Christopher Schmidt-Nowara (6 September 1966 – 27 June 2015) was a historian and professor at Tufts University, where he held the Prince of Asturias endowed chair. He previously taught at Fordham University, where he held Magis Distinguished Professor and associate chair of the history department at Fordham University. He was a member of Minda de Gunzburg Center for European Studies at Harvard University until his death "of a pulmonary embolism caused by sepsis, which was related to a short but virulent and undiagnosed staph infection." At the time of his death researching on Spanish prisoners of war during the resistance against French rule (1808–1814) and the independence struggles in Spanish America (1810–1830).

He completed his undergraduate studies in Kenyon College in 1988 and obtained his Ph.D. from the University of Michigan in 1995, with Rebecca Scott as his mentor.

He joined Tufts in 2011. His research focused on historiography and intellectual history of Spanish Colonialism, as well as on slavery in, and emancipation of, the Spanish colonies, particularly in the 19th century. He became well known internationally despite his brief career, co-authoring many of his works with Spanish researchers and cooperating often with colleagues at European and Latin American universities. This made him a well-known name in academic circles outside the US. He was a fellow at the University of Puerto Rico, the University of São Paulo, Princeton and the Fernand Braudel Center at Binghamton University, as well as a collaborator and editor for Universitat Pompeu Fabra. He also taught as a visiting professor at Stanford University.

== Publications ==
=== Books ===
- 2013 Slavery and Antislavery in Spain's Atlantic Empire (Berghahn Books in cooperation with Universitat Pompeu Fabra)
- 2011 Slavery, Freedom and Abolition in Latin America and the Atlantic World. Albuquerque: University of New Mexico Press. ISBN 978-0826339041
- 2008 The Conquest of History: Spanish Colonialism and National Histories in the Nineteenth Century.(Pitt Latin American Series.) Pittsburgh, Pa.: University of Pittsburgh Press. ISBN 978-0822959908
- 1990 Empire and Antislavery in Spain, Cuba, and Puerto Rico, 1833–1874. University of Pittsburgh Press. ISBN 978-0822956907

=== Edited works ===
- 2018 A Spanish Prisoner in the Ruins of Napoleon's Empire: The Diary of Fernando Blanco White's Flight to Freedom, edited. Louisiana State University Press 2018. ISBN 978-0807168547
- 2005 Interpreting Spanish Colonialism: Empires, Nations, and Legends. editor with John M. Nieto-Phillips. Albuquerque: University of New Mexico Press. ISBN 978-0826336736

== Editor ==
- Bulletin for Spanish and Portuguese Historical Studies
- Illes i Imperis/Islands and Empires (Universitat Pompeu Fabra, Barcelona)
- Spanish historiography (August 2004)
