= Irene Silverblatt =

- Born: 1948 (age 77–78)
- Awards: Guggenheim Fellowship; 1992; Radcliffe Fellowship; 2001–2002

Academic background
- Education: University of Michigan (PhD)
- Thesis: Moon, Sun, and Devil: Inca and Colonial Transformations of Andean Gender Relations (1981)

Academic work
- Discipline: Anthropologist
- Sub-discipline: Cultural anthropology; Anthropology of Peru
- Institutions: Duke University

Irene Silverblatt (born 1948) is a professor of cultural anthropology at Duke University. Her work revolves mainly around race and religion in Peru during the Spanish Inquisition. Silverblatt earned her PhD at the University of Michigan.

Silverblatt studies the intersection of the categories of race and religion, and how colonial categories based on them affect the contemporary world. She is a leading scholar in Peruvian late modern history and the effects of religion and race in Spanish South America.

== Articles ==
- Glauz-Todrank, Annalise E; Boyarin, Jonathan; Silverblatt, Irene; Geller, Jay; Gross, Aaron; Imhoff, Sarah; Sippy, Shana (2014). "Jewish identification and critical theory: The political significance of conceptual categories". Critical Research on Religion. 2 (2): 165–194. doi:10.1177/2050303214535009.
- Silverblatt, Irene (2012). "Heresies and Colonial Geopolitics". Romanic Review. 103 (1/2): 65–80. doi:10.1215/26885220-103.1-2.65. ProQuest 1321732981.
- "Confronting Nationalisms, Cosmopolitan Visions, and the Politics of Memory: Aesthetics of Reconciliation and Selma Meerbaum-Eisinger in Western Ukraine". Dissidences. 4 (8). 2012.
- Silverblatt, Irene (2011). "Chasteté et pureté des liens sociaux dans le Pérou du XVIIe siècle". Cahiers du Genre. 50 (1): 17–40. doi:10.3917/cdge.050.0017.
- Silverblatt, Irene (2011). "Colonial Peru and the Inquisition: Race-Thinking, Torture, and the Making of the Modern World". Transforming Anthropology. 19 (2): 132–138. doi:10.1111/j.1548-7466.2011.01127.x.
- Silverblatt, Irene (2006). "Colonial Conspiracies". Ethnohistory. 53 (2): 259–280. doi:10.1215/00141801-53-2-259.
- Silverblatt, Irene (2000). "New Christians and New World Fears in Seventeenth-Century Peru". Comparative Studies in Society and History. 42 (3): 524–546. doi:10.1017/S0010417500002929. JSTOR 2696644.

== Book chapters ==
- Silverblatt, Irene (2002). "New Christians and New World Fears in Seventeenth-Century Peru". In Axel, Brian Keith (ed.). From the Margins: Historical Anthropology and Its Futures. Duke University Press. pp. 95–121. doi:10.2307/j.ctv1131256. ISBN 9780822328612. JSTOR j.ctv1131256.

== Books ==
- Silverblatt, Irene (2004). Modern Inquisitions: Peru and the Colonial Origins of the Civilized World. Duke University Press. ISBN 978-0-8223-3417-0.
- Silverblatt, Irene (1987). Moon, Sun, and Witches: Gender Ideologies and Class in Inca and Colonial Peru. Princeton University Press. ISBN 978-0-6910-2258-1.

=== Editing ===
- Meerbaum-Eisinger, Selma (2008-09-29). Silverblatt, Irene; Silverblatt, Helene (eds.). Harvest of Blossoms: Poems from a Life Cut Short. Translated by Glenn, Jerry; Birkmayer, Florian; Silverblatt, Helene; Silverblatt, Irene. Northwestern University Press. ISBN 978-0-8101-2537-7.
