= Toby Green =

British historian and author

Toby Green, FBA
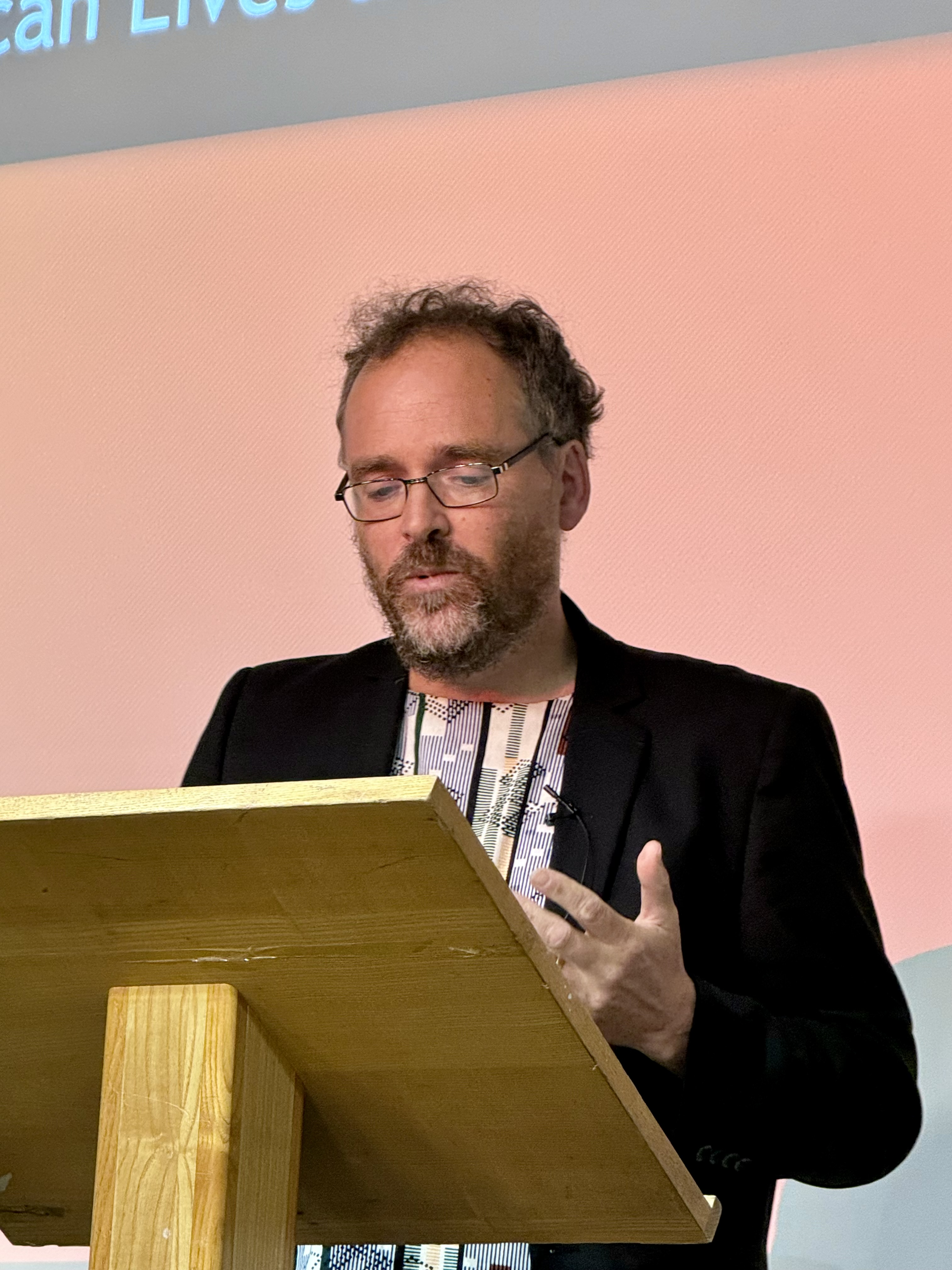
- Born: Toby Green; London, UK
- Education: University of Birmingham (Ph.D. in African Studies)
- Occupations: Historian, professor, author
- Website: www.toby-green.com

Toby Green FBA is a British historian of inequality. He is also a professor of Precolonial and Lusophone African History and Culture at King's College, London. He obtained his Doctor of Philosophy in African studies at the University of Birmingham. He is chair of the Fontes Historiae Africanae (Sources of African History) Committee of the British Academy, and has extensively published about African early modern history and colonial African slavery, mainly focused on the Atlantic slave trade in West Africa. Green's work has been funded by the Arts and Humanities Research Council, the British Library, the European Union, and the Leverhulme Trust. In 2017, he was awarded the prestigious Philip Leverhulme Prize for History. His work on the history of African and global inequalities has been translated into more than ten languages.

Green was elected a Fellow of the British Academy in 2024.

== African economic history ==
Green's book A Fistful of Shells: West Africa from the Rise of the Slave Trade to the Age of Revolution won the 2019 Nayef Al-Rodhan Prize for Global Cultural Understanding. The book was also awarded the 2020 Jerry Bentley Prize in World History of the American Historical Association and was the winner of the 2020 Historical Writers' Association Non-Fiction Crown Award. A Fistful of Shells was a finalist for the 2019 LA Times Book prize, and was shortlisted for the 2019 Cundill History Prize and the 2020 Wolfson History Prize. The book was widely reviewed and highly praised in newspapers, magazines, and academic journals. One reviewer emphasized how Green "dismantles the racist myth of west African “backwardness”. He shows that the inequalities that made the European “scramble for Africa” possible grew out of a catastrophe, the path to which began in the 15th century."

== West Africa and the Transatlantic slave trade ==
Green's The Rise of the Trans-Atlantic Slave Trade in Western Africa, 1300–1589 explores the history of the rise of the Atlantic slave trade in its very early years in West Africa. Covering the region between the River Senegal and Sierra Leone, from the fourteenth to sixteenth century, and drawing on a very rich set of written and oral sources in several languages, Green argues that pre-existing European and African social and cultural patterns shaped the development of the transatlantic slave trade.

Green has many other publications on the economic history of global Africa, slavery, the Atlantic slave trade, and the cultural and economic links between the Americas and Africa.

In 2025, Green published The Heretic of Cacheu: Struggles over Life in a Seventeenth-Century West African Port, a global microhistory of Cacheu, an early slave-trading port in Western Africa, through the life of Crispina Peres, a West African woman and trader who was persecuted by the Portuguese Inquisition. The book has been widely praised with glowing reviews in major academic journals such as the American Historical Review, the African Studies Review, and Slavery and Abolition. In September 2026, The Heretic of Cacheu was shortlisted for the African Studies Best Book Prize.

== Spanish Inquisition ==
Green has also written on the Spanish Inquisition. In Inquisition: The Reign of Fear, he addresses the Spanish Inquisition mainly through Hispano-American sources. He notes that the great unchecked power given to inquisitors meant that they were "widely seen as above the law", and sometimes had motives for imprisoning, while sometimes executing alleged offenders other than to punish religious nonconformity, mainly in Ibero-America. Green disagrees with the notion of a Black Legend of the Spanish Inquisition and often quotes sixteenth-century sources, regarding the institution's abuse of power in Latin America, and his work often cited regarding this subject.

== Work on the COVID-19 pandemic ==
Green was one of the very few academic historians to have worked extensively on the COVID-19 pandemic, addressing the impacts of the measures taken to contain the pandemic through the lens of inequality. He wrote two editions of the book The Covid Consensus, as well as various newspaper articles on how measures such as the lockdowns harmed the poor populations, especially in the Global South. He also broadcast a series of podcast interviews with academics from Africa and Latin America for Collateral Global. Green's main concern was the impact of COVID-19 lockdowns on impoverished people around the world, especially in Africa. His work was widely discussed in the Guardian, Al-Ahram, El Pais, and Le Monde. By 2023, when a growing number of papers in academic journals and mainstream media outlets eventually started recognizing the negative impacts of lockdowns in the Global South and among the poor populations, the working class, and schoolchildren in the Global North, Green's contribution to these debates has proved even more crucial. In November 2025, Oxford University Committee for Academic Freedom hosted the first open debate about the policies implemented during the COVID-19 pandemic. Green brought again to light the disastrous effects of these policies, especially the lockdowns, in African countries.

== History, Global Inequalities, and Reimperialism ==
Drawing on his work on the history of global inequalities and empire developed in his magnus opus A Fistful of Shells and his growing interest in the history of the present, Toby Green has been writing and lecturing on how these transformations that have been evolving since the end of the Cold War have affected the world order and the rise of new forms of inequalities. In June 2026, Green delivered the groundbreaking Eric Hobsbawn Memorial Lecture titled "History at the 'End of History': Inequality and Discourse in the Age of Reimperialism." The lecture focused on how the rise of Artificial Intelligence, the assault on reading and thought independent of computation, and on how the production of endless deepfakes all challenge the future of the historical profession. This lecture placed this juncture of crisis within the historical frame of the last three decades. Green examined how the expansion of mass inequalities, on national and global levels, has shaped a frame in which institutionalized history is deemed a threat to the consolidation of these economic ‘gains’ in an era of reimperialisms of all kinds.

== Publications ==
=== Major single-authored books ===
- The Heretic of Cacheu: Struggles over Life in a Seventeenth-Century West African Port (Penguin, Allen Lane, and University of Chicago Press, 2025) ISBN 978-1802061598
- The Covid Consensus: The Global Assault on Democracy and the Poor. A Critique from the Left, co-authored with Thomas Fazi (Hurst, 2023) ISBN 978-1787388413
- The Covid Consensus: The New Politics of Global Inequality (Hurst, 2021) ISBN 978-1787385221
- A Fistful of Shells: West Africa from the Rise of the Slave Trade to the Age of Revolution (Penguin, Allen Lane, University of Chicago Press, 2019) ISBN 9780226644578
- The Rise of the Transatlantic Slave Trade in Western Africa (Cambridge University Press, 2012) ISBN 978-1107634718
- The Inquisition: The Reign of Fear (Macmillan, 2007) ISBN 978-0330443357
- Thomas More's Magician: A Novel Account of Utopia in Mexico (Weidenfeld & Nicolson, 2004) ISBN 0753819783
- Meeting the Invisible Man: Secrets and Magic in West Africa (Weidenfeld & Nicolson, 2001) ISBN 978-0297646150
- Saddled with Darwin: A Journey through South America on Horseback (Weidenfeld & Nicolson, 1999) ISBN 0571248284

=== Edited and co-edited books ===
- Covid-19 Restrictions in the Global South Accelerating Inequalities, Worsening Human Rights, co-edited by Toby Green, Aleida Borges, and Sundararaman Thiagarajan. Bloomsbury Academic, 2026. ISBN 9781350542365
- African Voices from the Inquisition, Vol. 1: The Trial of Crispina Peres of Cacheu, Guinea-Bissau (1646-1668), co-edited by Toby Green, Philip Havik, and Filipa Ribeiro da Silva. Oxford University Press, 2021. ISBN 978-0197266762
- Landscapes, Sources, and Intellectual Projects of the West African Past, co-edited by Toby Green and Benedetta Rossi. Brill, 2018. ISBN 978-90-04-34883-7
- Guinea-Bissau: Micro-State to Narco State, co-edited by Toby Green and Patrick Chabal. London: Hurst, 2016. ISBN 978-1849045216
- Brokers of Change: Atlantic Commerce and Cultures in Precolonial Western Africa (Oxford: Oxford University Press, 2012). ISBN 978-0197265208

=== Selected articles ===
- "The COVID-19 Pandemic Response and the New Era of Austerity in Africa." African Affairs Olutayo Adesina, Aleida Mendes Borges, Carlos Cardoso, Toby Green (2026), https://doi.org/10.1093/afraf/adag001
- "Africa and Capitalism: Repairing a History of Omission." Capitalism 3, 2 (2022): 301–332.
- "Covid-19: Medicine and Colonialism, Past and Present." Journal of Extreme Anthropology 6, no. 2 (2022): E33-E46.
- "From ‘Commodity Currencies’ to Covid Loans: Africa and Global Inequality, Past and Present." Journal of the British Academy (2022): 39-54.
- "The Historical Lecture: Past, Present and Future." Transactions of the Royal Historical Society 1 (2022): 45–67.
- "Baculamento or Encomienda?: Legal Pluralisms and the Contestation of Power in Pan-Atlantic World of the Sixteenth and Seventeenth Centuries," Journal of Global Slavery 2, no. 3 (2017): 310–336.
- “Africa and the Price Revolution: Currency Imports and Socioeconomic Change in West And West-Central Africa During the 17th Century,” Journal of African History 57, no. 1 (2016), 1-24.
- “Beyond an Imperial Atlantic: Trajectories of Africans From Upper Guinea and West-Central Africa in the Early Atlantic World", Past and Present 230 (2016), 91–122.
- "Memories of Violence: Slavery, The Slave Trade, and Forced Labour in Greater Senegambia in the Past and the Present." Mande Studies 16-17 (2015): 169–186.
- "Silent Trade." History in Africa: An Annual Journal of Method 40, no. s1 (2013):. s3-s6.
- “Building Slavery in the Atlantic World: Atlantic Connections and the Changing Institution of Slavery in Cabo Verde, 15th-16th Centuries”, Slavery and Abolition 32/2, 2011, 227-45:
