= Francisco López (16th-century painter) =

Spanish painter

Francisco López was a Spanish painter in Madrid during the reign of Philip II (1556–1598). He was a scholar of Gaspar Becerra, who remembered him in his will in 1568. In 1598, he painted the retablo sculpted by Esteban Jordán for Santa Maria de Montserrat Abbey.
