= Pedro de Zárate =

Argentine priest (1622–1683)

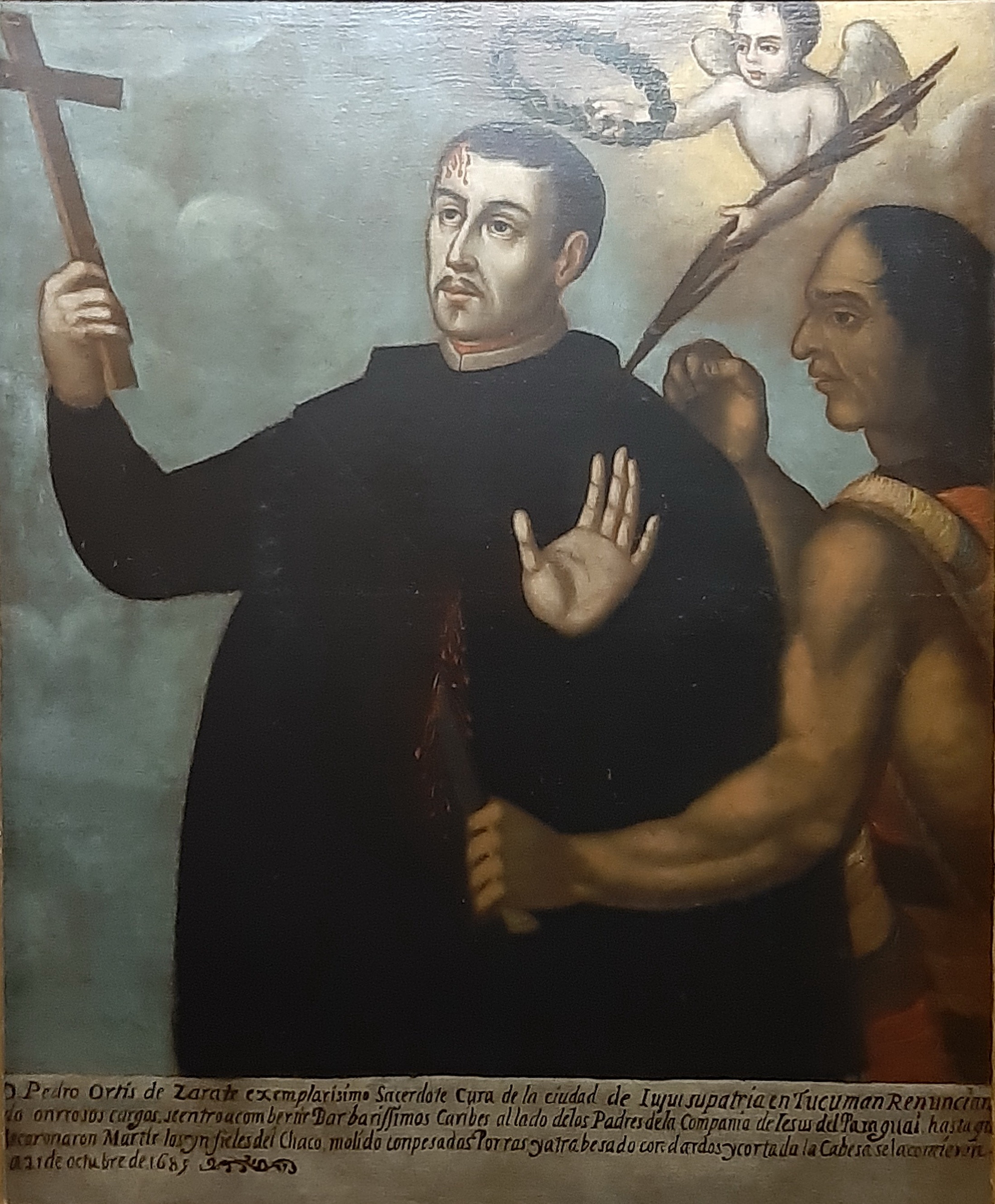
- A painting of Zárate getting murdered
- Born: Pedro Ortiz de Zárate Garnica; 1622; San Salvador de Jujuy
- Died: October 27, 1683 (aged 60–61)
- Cause of death: Stab wounds
- Burial place: Calle Caseros y Miter in Salta
- Occupation: Priest
- Spouse: Petronila de Murguía
- Children: 2
- Relatives: Juan de Garay (nephew)

Signature
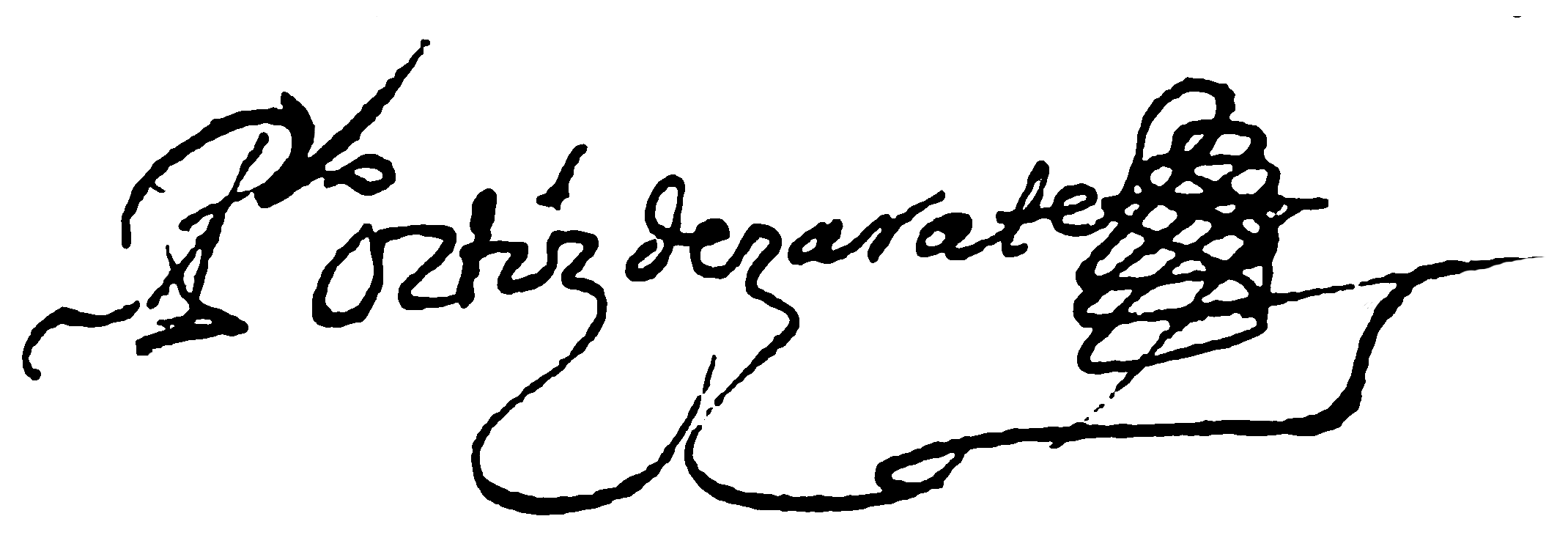

Pedro Ortiz de Zárate Garnica (1622 – October 27, 1683) was a Spanish catholic priest. He was the uncle of Juan de Garay, one of the first people to found the city of Buenos Aires, the capital of Argentina. Pedro belonged to a family of conquerors who held possessions of encomiendas. In 1683, he, along with others, were murdered by indigenous tribes due to their supposed hatred of faith.

== Biography ==
Zárate was born in San Salvador de Jujuy, in what is now northwestern Argentina, in 1622. His family owned several ecomiendas in the region. He later rose to the rank of royal lieutenant in his hometown, helped by his family's political connections. In 1644, at age 17, he married Petronila de Ibarra y Murguía, and they had two children. Nine years after their marriage, his wife died when a building collapsed on her, killing her instantly. Afterward, Zárate lived as a widower for many years. In 1675, he decided to leave his civilian life and become a priest.

== Murder ==
In May 1683, Zárate set out on a missionary journey with two other priests and 70 companions. On October 27, 1683, Zárate, along with priest Giovanni Antonio Solinas, and 18 others, were murdered by indigenous tribes due to their supposed hatred of faith. He was buried at a Jesuit church in Calle Caseros y Miter in Salta.

In 2021, Pope Francis blessed many martyrs including Zárate, Pope John Paul I and others.
