= Francisco López Mena =

Mexican politician

- Born: 15 August 1953 (age 72); Quintana Roo, Mexico
- Occupation: Politician
- Political party: PAN

Francisco Xavier López Mena (born 15 August 1953) is a Mexican politician affiliated with the National Action Party. As of 2014 he served as Deputy of the LIX Legislature of the Mexican Congress as a plurinominal representative.
