= Lu Ann Homza =

American historian and scholar

Academic background
- Education: Scripps College, University of Chicago

Academic work
- Discipline: History
- Sub-discipline: early modern Europe
- Institutions: College of William and Mary

Lu Ann Homza is an American historian and scholar of the intellectual history of medieval and early modern Europe. She is a professor at the College of William and Mary and the school's former Dean for Educational Policy.

== Life ==
She graduated with a B.A. from Scripps College in 1980 and received an M.A. in 1981 and Ph.D. in 1992 from the University of Chicago. Her main interest is the intellectual history of Spain and Italy from 1400 until 1600 and her main focus of research since 1998 has been the Spanish Inquisition.

== Books ==
- Religious Authority in the Spanish Renaissance (Johns Hopkins University Press, 2000)
- The Spanish Inquisition, 1478–1614: An Anthology of Sources (edited and translated by Homza; Hackett Press, 2006)
