= Francisco Lopez y Palomino =

Spanish painter

Francisco Lopez y Palomino (active 18th century) was a Spanish painter. He studied in Madrid, and in 1759 joined the Royal Academy of San Fernando. He excelled chiefly in portraiture, although he also painted some genre pictures.
