= Francisco López de Villalobos =

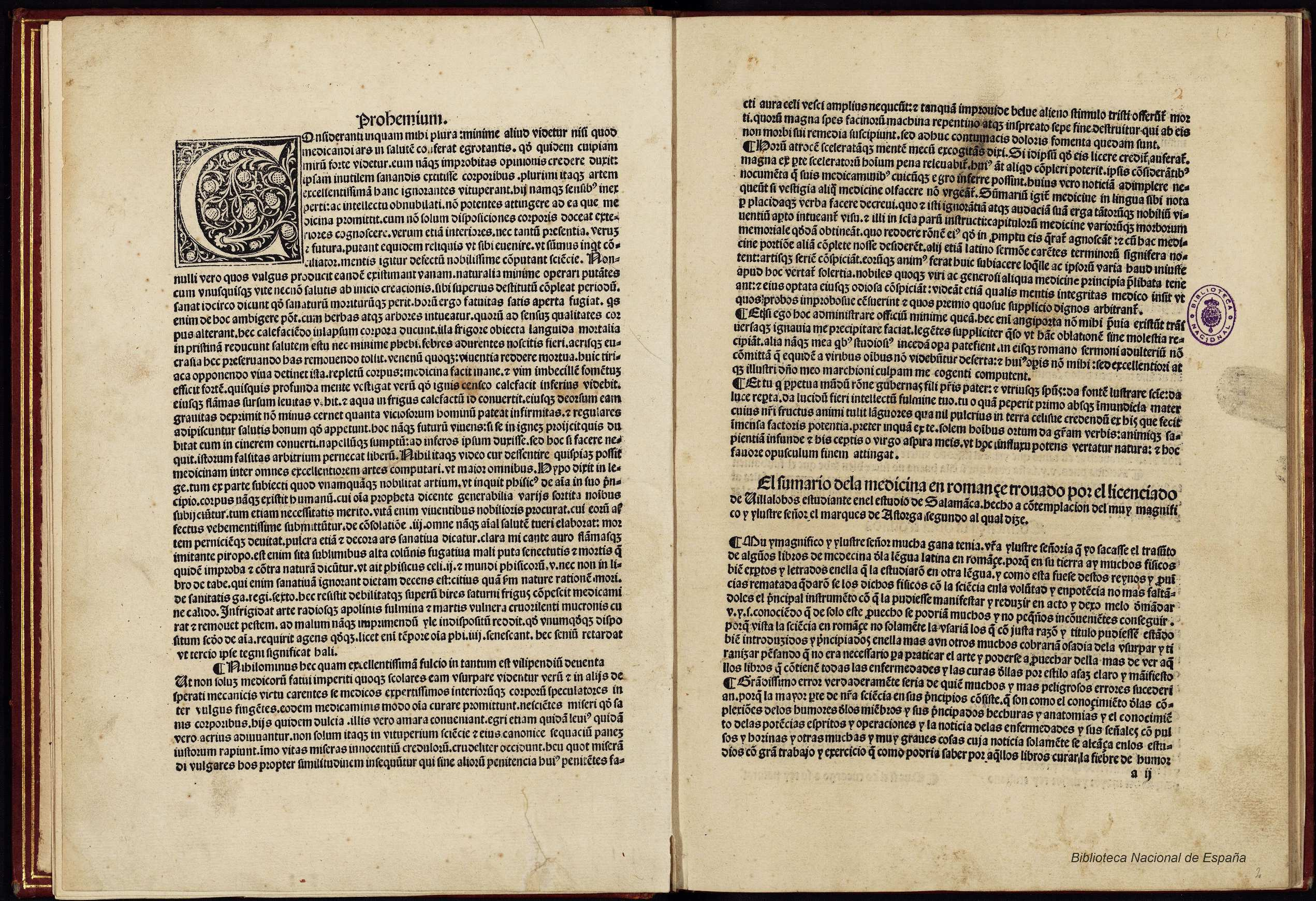

Francisco Lopez de Villalobos (1473–1549) was a Jewish converso, physician and author in the 15th century. Villalobos is credited with one of the earliest descriptions of syphilis. He has been considered part of the School of Salamanca.

Francisco descended from a long line of physicians; his father, grandfather and several ancestors before him serving Spanish nobility, including King Fernando, the Duke of Alba, the Queen of Aragon and Emperor Charles V.
