= Juan de Garay y Becerra =

Spanish nobleman (1558–1683)

Lieutenant Governor of Santa Fe Province
- In office 1635–1637
- Monarch: Philip IV of Spain
- Preceded by: Alonso Fernández Montiel
- Succeeded by: Cristóbal de Garay

Personal details
- Born: 1558 Asunción, Paraguay
- Died: 1638 (aged 79–80) Santa Fe, Argentina
- Spouse(s): Juana de Saavedra; Juana de Espindola
- Occupation: Government
- Profession: Army's officer

Military service
- Allegiance: Spain
- Branch/service: Spanish Army
- Years of service: c.1578-1638
- Rank: General

Juan de Garay y Becerra (1558–1638) was a Spanish nobleman, who served during the Viceroyalty of Peru as alcalde and lieutenant governor of Santa Fe (Argentina).

He was born in Asunción (Paraguay), son of the founder of Buenos Aires Don Juan de Garay and Doña Isabel de Becerra, daughter of Francisco de Becerra and Isabel de Contreras y Mendoza, belonging to a distinguished family. He was married to Juana de Saavedra, daughter of Martín Suárez de Toledo and María de Sanabria. And the sister of Hernando Arias de Saavedra, governor of the Río de la Plata and Paraguay.

His second wife was Juana de Espindola y Palomino, daughter of Spanish conquistadores.
