= Francisco López de Osornio Merlo =

Capitán Francisco López de Osornio y Merlo

Personal details
- Born: Francisco López de Osornio y Merlo de la Mota; 1681 Buenos Aires, Viceroyalty of Peru
- Died: 1756 (aged 74–75) Buenos Aires, Viceroyalty of Peru
- Spouse: María Gamiz de las Cuevas
- Children: Domingo López de Osornio; Lorenzo López de Osornio; María Josefa López de Osornio; Tomasa López de Osornio; Juana Rosa López de Osornio; Justa López de Osornio; Faustina López de Osornio; Clemente López de Osornio; Pascual López de Osornio
- Occupation: army landowner
- Profession: military man

Military service
- Allegiance: Spanish Empire
- Branch/service: Spanish Army
- Years of service: 1700-1750
- Rank: Captain
- Unit: Fuerte de Buenos Aires
- Commands: Milicias Provinciales de Buenos Aires

Francisco López de Osornio Merlo (1681 – 1756) was a Spanish military leader and landowner, who served during the Viceroyalty of Peru as Captain of the provincial militias of Buenos Aires.

== Biography ==
He was born on September 7, 1681, in Buenos Aires, the son of Francisco López Osornio and Tomasa Merlo, belonging to an illustrious family of Spanish and Creole origin. He was married on September 11, 1701, in Metropolitan Cathedral to María Gamiz de las Cuevas, daughter of Pedro Gamiz de las Cuevas and Tomasa Álvarez de Lasarte, a distinguished Spanish family from Madrid. His son Clemente López de Osornio, a landowner belonging to the Spanish Army, was assassinated during an indigenous incursion to the Province of Buenos Aires.

He participated in the military expeditions aimed at controlling the indigenous advance towards the Province of Buenos Aires. He held the honorific post of Alférez Real of the city, being the one in charge of carrying the Estandarte Real in the day of Saint Martin of Tours.

In 1726 he served as commander of the Fort of Barragán, where he ordered the construction of the first chapel.
