= Clemente López de Osornio =

Spanish military leader

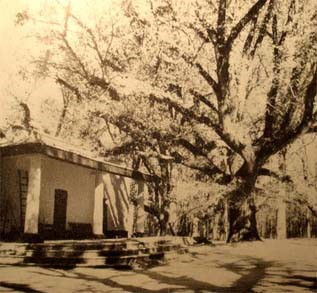
- El Rincón de López

Personal details
- Born: Clemente José López de Osornio Gamiz; November 25, 1720 Buenos Aires, Viceroyalty of Peru
- Died: December 13, 1783 (aged 63) Rincón de López, Chascomús, Viceroyalty of the Río de la Plata
- Spouse(s): Martina Arroyo Jiménez; María Rubio Díaz Gamiz
- Occupation: Rancher
- Profession: Army's officer
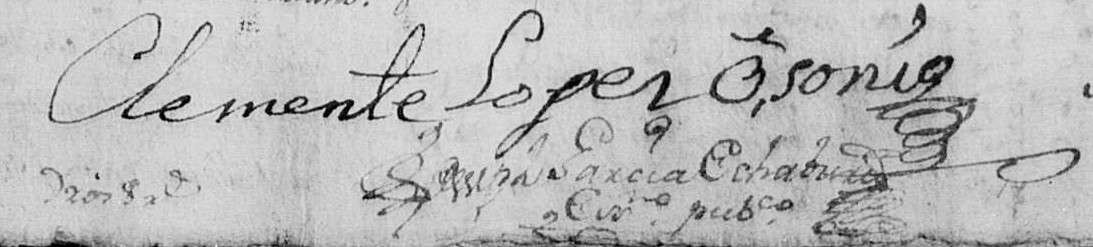
- Signature

Military service
- Allegiance: Spain
- Branch/service: Spanish Army
- Years of service: 1736-1779
- Rank: Captain
- Unit: Blandengues de Buenos Aires

Clemente López de Osornio (November 25, 1720 – December 13, 1783) was a Spanish in the Viceroyalty of the Río de la Plata military leader. He served during the Viceroyalty of Peru as Captain of the Regiment of Blandengues of Buenos Aires.

== Biography ==
Born into a family of Criollo descent, he was baptized on November 25, 1720, in Buenos Aires, son of Francisco López Osornio and María Gamiz de las Cuevas Álvarez Lasarte.

In 1736 Clemente López de Osornio enlisted in the provincial militia of cavalry and served in the defense in the fort of Arrecifes against Indians. Three years later, he participated in the campaign of Captain Juan de San Martín to the area that is now Laguna de los Padres, near Mar del Plata.

In 1752 Osornio was appointed Commissioner in the pago of Magdalena, and in 1765 he served as commanding general of militia in Province of Buenos Aires, where he led an expedition to the Salinas Grandes, west of Bahía Blanca. Along the way, he carried out a census of the tribes that roamed the area, and organized five companies of Blandengues of cavalry intended to garrison the southern border against the Indians.

In 1766 Clemente López Osornio was appointed alcalde de la hermandad in Magdalena, which covered large areas of land, including Avellaneda, Quilmes, Lomas de Zamora and the present territory of Almirante Brown.

In 1767 López de Osornio led a military expedition against the Guaraní tribes. Years later, in 1775, he participated of an expedition in Cairú (Tandil) and Laguna Blanca Grande (Olavarría) against the Pampas tribes.

López Osornio retired from the army in 1779, dedicating itself since then to the administration of his ranch in Chascomús. He became a wealthy landowner, and in 1782 he was appointed as representative of the landowners in the Cabildo porteño.

== Family and death ==
López Osornio was married in Buenos Aires on October 9, 1746, to Martina Arroyo Jiménez de Paz, daughter of Tomás de Arroyo Palacios and Ignacia Jiménez de Paz Parejas. They had four children: Catalina, Andrés Ramón, María Magdalena and Ángel López de Osornio.

After the death of his first wife, he was remarried in the Buenos Aires Cathedral on February 25, 1766, to María Manuela Rubio Díaz Gamiz. She belonged to a distinguished family, being the daughter of Juan José Rubio and Isabel Díaz Gamiz. They had six children: Juana Bautista, María Rafaela, Petrona Josefa, Agustina, José Silverio and María Luisa López de Osornio.

On December 13, 1783, Clemente López de Osornio, his son Andrés, his laborers and slaves were killed by an incursion of the Pampas tribes against his ranch, El Rincón de López, located in Chascomús, Buenos Aires Province.

He was the maternal grandfather of Juan Manuel de Rosas, a distinguished caudillo, who held the title of Governor of Buenos Aires uninterruptedly from March 7, 1835, to February 3, 1852.
