= Domingo de Basavilbaso =

Spanish politician and military captain (1709–1775)

Don Domingo de Basavilbaso
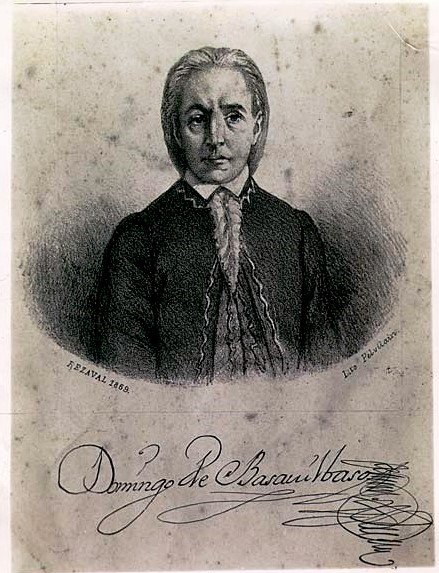
- portrait of Domingo Basavilbaso

Mayor of Buenos Aires
- In office 1745–1746
- Preceded by: Francisco de Herrera y Loizaga
- Succeeded by: Juan Martín de Mena

Vice-Mayor of Buenos Aires
- In office 1738–1739
- Preceded by: Alonso del Pozo Vitte
- Succeeded by: Faustino de Larrea

Procurador General of Buenos Aires
- In office 1739–1740
- Preceded by: Carlos Narváez
- Succeeded by: Miguel Antonio de Merlo

Administrador General of the Real Renta de Correos
- In office 1768–1772
- Succeeded by: Manuel de Basavilbaso

Personal details
- Born: Domingo de Basavilbaso y de la Presa; 1 September 1709 Llodio, Spain
- Died: 9 May 1775 (aged 65) Buenos Aires, Argentina
- Resting place: Buenos Aires Cathedral
- Spouse: María Ignacia de Urtubia y Toledo

Military service
- Allegiance: Spanish Empire
- Branch/service: Spanish Army
- Years of service: 1729-1760
- Rank: Captain
- Unit: Fuerte de Buenos Aires
- Commands: Milicias de Caballería de Buenos Aires

Domingo de Basavilbaso (1709 – 1775) was a Spanish politician and soldier, who served during the colonial period of Argentina as alcalde, comandante, procurador and regidor of Buenos Aires. He was the founder of the Basavilbaso family in Buenos Aires, related from the colonial period to the beginning of the 20th century with the main Spanish, Argentine and Uruguayan patrician families.

He took an active part in the expulsion of the Jesuits, and in some military campaigns aimed at containing the indigenous advance in the Province of Buenos Aires. He also had a distinguished career as General Mail Administrator in the Río de la Plata territories, actively participating in the beginnings of the Argentine mail.

== Biography ==
He was born in Llodio, Álava, in the Basque Country, northern Spain., the son of Domingo de Basavilbaso and María Rosa de la Presa, belonging to a distinguished family. He arrived at the port of Buenos Aires from Montevideo, establishing itself in the city of Buenos Aires around the year 1729, where it was dedicated to the commerce.

Its main activity in the territories of the Viceroyalty of Peru was the establishment of mail in the Provinces of the Rio de la Plata. In 1748, Basavilbaso established the mail between Buenos Aires and Potosí, being his general administrator until 1772. He had created a system of posts, which linked Buenos Aires with Mendoza and Santiago de Chile, to the west; Córdoba, Santiago del Estero, the northern provinces and Upper Peru. He also took active part in the organization of the maritime mail of the Río de la Plata.

He held various political positions during the colonial period of Argentina, including as Vice Mayor of Buenos Aires in 1738, and Mayor in 1745. He also served as Councilor, Alférez Real, and was appointed as Attorney General of Buenos Aires in 1739. He also had a long participation in the military expeditions against the indigenous incursions in the current Argentine territories. He served as commander of provincial militias cavalry regiment of Buenos Aires, in charge of organizing an expedition against the Pampas tribes, who had invaded the borders of jurisdiction of Buenos Aires Province. In these expeditions it was possible to capture the cacique Calelián, main leader of the attacks against the civil populations of the Province of Buenos Aires.

Domingo de Basavilbaso was one of the first Spaniards to carry out explorations in the Patagonia towards the middle of the 18th century. He also carried out some activities as a legal representative of distinguished colonial political personalities such as Guillermo Ross, a Scottish military and politician genealogically linked to the Basavilbaso family.

== Family ==
Domingo de Basavilbaso was married on 20 February 1730 in the Buenos Aires Cathedral to María Ignacia de Urtubia Toledo, daughter of José de Urtubia Enríquez and María de Toledo Ojeda, a distinguished Spanish family from Navarre and Buenos Aires.

He and his wife were the parents of Francisco Antonio Basavilbaso, Manuel Basavilbaso, María Gabriela Basavilbaso, abbess, María Rosa Basavilbaso, wife Vicente de Azcuénaga, and mother of Miguel de Azcuénaga, María Victoria Basavilbaso, married Domingo Ignacio Urien, born in Biscay, Rafaela Basavilbaso, wife José Ignacio Merlo, and María Paula Basavilbaso, who was married to Francisco Mariano Mendizaga, a silversmith, born in 1752 in Buenos Aires.

In his house, Domingo de Basavilbaso hosted important political figures of the time as José Joaquín de Viana, governor of Montevideo, and Ambrosio O'Higgins, personal friend of the family. His luxurious residence was located in the current Avenida Belgrano between Calle Balcarce and Paseo Colón (neighborhood of Santo Domingo).

His descendants were linked directly and indirectly with the families of Carlos Anaya, Luis Alberto de Herrera, Juan de Lezica, Marcos de Riglos, Juan Dillon. His granddaughter Ana de Azcuénaga, was married to Antonio de Olaguer y Feliú, Viceroy of Río de la Plata. His son, Manuel de Basavilbaso was awarded the knighthood of the Royal Order of Charles III in 1788.
