= The British Commercial Rooms of Buenos Aires =

- Dissolved: 1840
- Type: Society
- Location: Buenos Aires, Argentina
- Origins: British
- Services: Community
- Official language: English
- Staff: Joseph Thwaites; Thomas Gowland

The British Commercial Rooms of Buenos Aires (Spanish: Cámara de Comercio Británico) was an organization in charge of matters concerning the British community in the Río de la Plata.

== History ==
Until 1806 the small group of foreigners of British origin, had professed the Catholic religion and related with women of distinguished Creole families of Buenos Aires. Among these men established in the Río de Plata towards the 18th century, they include Charles Wright and Paul Thompson, from London, and Robert Young and William Ross, natives of Scotland.

The British Commercial Rooms of Buenos Aires was founded in 1811 by traders of British origin, established in Buenos Aires since the first English Invasion. These new British immigrants were granted rights to trade their products in the Río de la Plata since 1809. They maintained economic ties with the Creoles, and mostly they were married to women of their same nationality.

In general, merchants of English origin established their businesses throughout the San Nicolás neighborhood, concentrating a large majority on Reconquista Street. The Scots and Irish Catholics installed their shops on Calle de la Piedad (now Avenida Bartolomé Mitre).

The British Commercial Rooms was located on 25 de Mayo street in the neighborhood of San Nicolás. It worked until 1840, and among its achievements it includes the installation of a cemetery, the construction of a temple (Cathedral of St. John the Baptist), and several educational establishments for the British community in Buenos Aires.

It was a community totally closed to the Creole natives and foreigners. Around 1830 Thomas George Love, editor of the newspaper The British Packet, founded a new commercial association open to the native community of Argentina, that also included the descendants of the first British immigrants of Buenos Aires.
