= Guillermo Ross =

Scottish army officer

Capitán Guillermo Ross

Gobernador interino of Buenos Aires
- In office ?–?
- Monarch: Ferdinand VI of Spain
- Preceded by: ?
- Succeeded by: ?

Sargento Mayor de los Reales Ejércitos in the Fuerte de Buenos Aires
- In office ?–?
- Monarch: Ferdinand VI of Spain
- Preceded by: ?
- Succeeded by: ?

Personal details
- Born: William Ross Munro; 1695 Little Tarrell, Kingdom of Scotland
- Died: 1757 (aged 61–62) Chuquisaca, Viceroyalty of Peru
- Spouse: María Antonia del Pozo Silva
- Children: María Cristina Ross; María Aurelia Ross; Jorge Miguel Ross; Juan Guillermo Ross; Cayetana Beatriz Ross
- Occupation: army politician
- Profession: military man
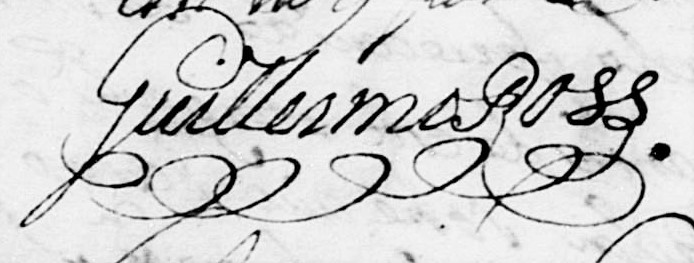
- Signature

Military service
- Allegiance: (United Kingdom) Great Britain; Spanish Empire
- Branch/service: British Army; Spanish Army
- Years of service: c. 1715–1750s
- Rank: Captain
- Unit: Fuerte de Buenos Aires

Guillermo Ross (1695 – 1757) was a Scottish army officer belonging to the Clan Ross and Munro by maternal line. He had a great military and political activity in the Río de la Plata, occupying the positions of sergeant major and governor of Buenos Aires.

== Biography ==
He was son of Alexander Ross and Margaret Munro Forrester, belonging to a noble Scottish family. He arrived at the Port of Buenos Aires as a member of the Company of the Real Asiento de Inglaterra. He held honorary positions in the city, being appointed as Sargento Mayor de la Plaza and served on an interim basis the governorship of Buenos Aires. He owned a large number of properties in the Río de la Plata territories and in his native country. His legal affairs were entrusted to Domingo de Basavilbaso and Francisco de Vieyra, in charge of his business in Buenos Aires, and Robert Munro, a relative in charge of his farm in Little Tarrel, Scottish Highlands.

His condition of Protestant brought him many problems to establish himself in Buenos Aires colonial. In 1740, he obtained permission of the authorities to marry with María Antonia Jacinta del Pozo Silva, daughter of Francisco Alonso del Pozo Silva and Antonia de Toledo y Ojeda, belonging to a distinguished family of the city. His daughters, María Cristina Ross and Maria Aurelia Ross, were married to Gregorio Ramos Mexía and Francisco Antonio Basavilbaso, two distinguished Spanish government officials.

His son, Jorge Ross del Pozo Silva was baptized on 17 July 1742, being his godfather Roberto Young, a well-known doctor of the city of Scottish origin. Through his grandsons, Hilario Ramos Mexía and Ildefonso Ramos Mexía, the blood of Guillermo Ross was present during the May Revolution of 1810, events that gave origin to the establishment of the Argentine Republic.

His descendant Nicanor Costa Méndez, was Minister of Foreign Affairs during the Guerra de las Malvinas.
