= Teatro Colonial =

Teatro Colonial de Buenos Aires
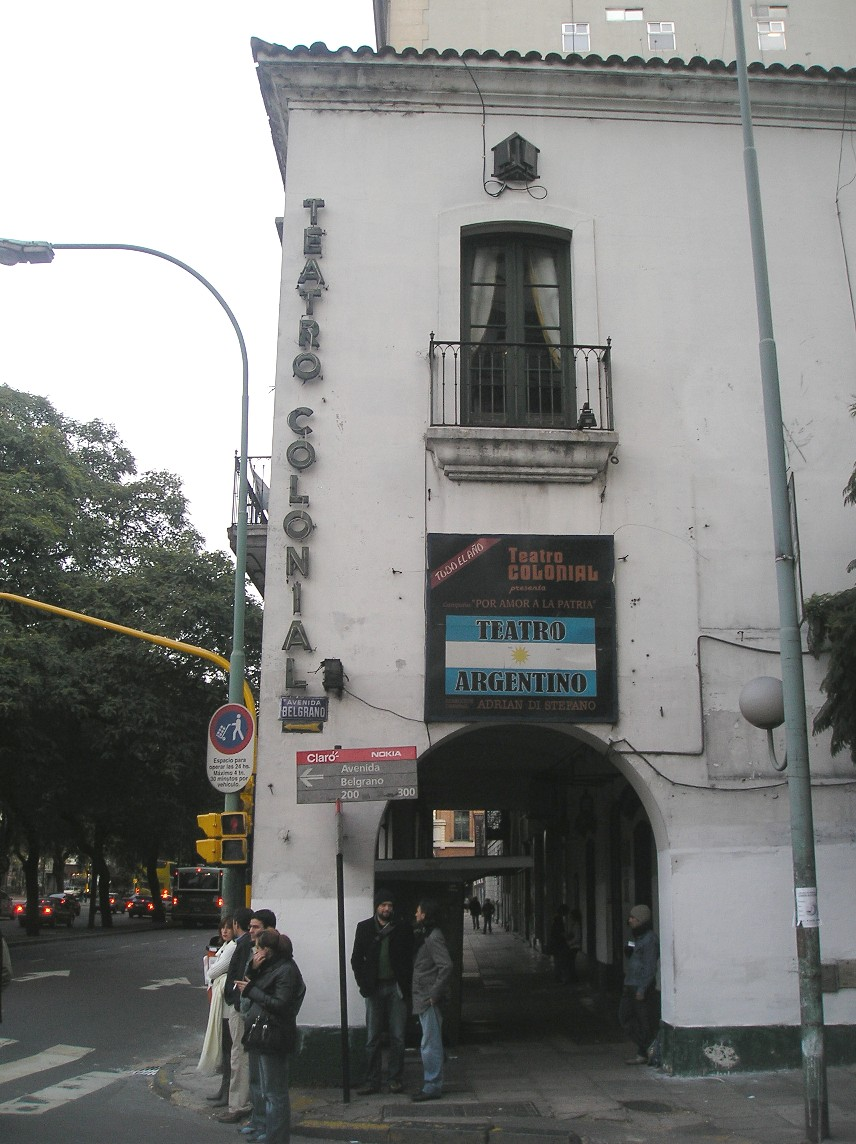

General information
- Status: Theater
- Architectural style: Colonial Revival architecture
- Location: Paseo Colón No. 413, San Telmo, Buenos Aires

Teatro Colonial is a theater of Buenos Aires located at the corners of Paseo Colon and Belgrano, San Telmo neighborhood.

The current building dates from 1945, and was built on the land that belonged to Vicente de Azcuenaga, a wealthy merchant born in 1706 in Biscay. It featured the performances of distinguished national culture referents, including Juan Carlos Gené and Sergio Renán.

Some works of the Colonial Theater were musicalized by notable musicians and tango singers such as Astor Piazzolla and Edmundo Rivero.
