= Francisco Antonio Basavilbaso =

Spanish jurist and politician (1732–1800)

Don Francisco Antonio de Basavilbaso

Mayor of Buenos Aires
- In office 1774–1775
- Preceded by: Domingo Urien
- Succeeded by: Manuel Antonio Warnes

Procurador General of Buenos Aires
- In office 1775–1776
- Preceded by: Felipe Santiago del Pozo
- Succeeded by: Martín de Sarratea

Escribano Mayor de Gobierno of Buenos Aires
- In office 1784–1795
- Preceded by: Tomás Fernández de Paredes
- Succeeded by: Ramón de Basavilbaso

Regidor of the Buenos Aires Cabildo
- In office 1768–1769

Personal details
- Born: Francisco Antonio de Basavilbaso y Urtubia; March 28, 1732 Buenos Aires, Argentina
- Died: c. 1800 Buenos Aires, Argentina
- Resting place: Buenos Aires Cathedral
- Spouse: María Aurelia Ross y del Pozo Silva

Military service
- Allegiance: Spanish Empire
- Branch/service: Spanish Army
- Years of service: 1760-1790
- Rank: Captain
- Unit: Fuerte de Buenos Aires

Francisco Antonio de Basavilbaso (1732 – c. 1800) was a jurist and politician, who held various government posts under the Viceroyalty of Peru and later the Viceroyalty of the Río de la Plata, including alcalde, escribano, regidor, and emissary of Buenos Aires in Spain.

== Biography ==
He was born in Buenos Aires (then part of the Viceroyalty of Peru), the son of Domingo de Basavilbaso and María Ignacia de Urtubia, belonging to a noble family of the city. He completed his elementary education in the city and traveled to Europe to study at the University of Seville, where he obtained his law degree in 1759. He married María Aurelia Ross in Buenos Aires. She was a daughter of Guillermo Ross and María Antonia del Pozo Silva, belonging to a family of Scottish and Creole origin .

He held various political positions in Buenos Aires including as regidor and alcalde of first vote in 1774, being appointed to the office of attorney general of the city in 1775. His works as procurador general of Buenos Aires, included various works concerning the establishment of public schools in the parishes of the city. He was also involved in educational reforms at the University of Córdoba, aimed at avoiding the long trips that law students had to make to the universities of Chuquisaca and Santiago.

He also had a distinguished job as Escribano Mayor of Government of the Río de la Plata, serving between 1784 and 1795. He was succeeded by his son José Ramón Basavilbaso, who also served as a government notary during the post colonial period. During his residence in Spain he had served like intermediary between the Spanish Court and his father, who held the position of administrator general of the Correo of the Río de la Plata.
