= Eugenio Lerdo de Tejada =

Spanish merchant and politician

Alcalde of Buenos Aires
- In office 1765–1766
- Monarch: Charles III
- Preceded by: Juan Miguel de Esparza
- Succeeded by: Juan de Lezica y Torrezuri

Personal details
- Born: 18th century La Rioja
- Died: 18th century Buenos Aires, Argentina
- Occupation: Politician
- Profession: Jurist
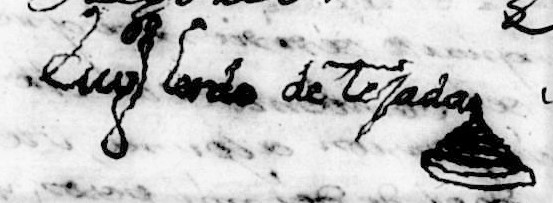
- Signature

Eugenio Lerdo de Tejada (c.1720 – c.1800) was a Spanish merchant and politician, who held various public positions in Buenos Aires during the colonial period, including like mayor and regidor of the city.

== Biography ==
He was born in Nájera, La Rioja, Spain, and was married in Buenos Aires to María Josefa Bustillo de Zeballos, daughter of Ignacio de Bustillos y Zeballos and Ana Domíguez Rabanal, belonging to a distinguished family.

Eugenio Lerdo de Tejada was appointed as procurator of Buenos Aires in 1762, and served for two terms as mayor of first vote of Buenos Aires, elected in 1761 and 1764. He also served as Corregidor of Oruro during the viceroyalty of José Manso de Velasco.
