= Miguel Antonio de Merlos =

Spanish military man and politician

Don Miguel Antonio de Merlos y Jiménez de los Ríos

Governor of Porco
- In office 1708–1709
- Preceded by: ?
- Succeeded by: ?

Mayordomo of Buenos Aires
- In office 1705–1706
- Preceded by: ?
- Succeeded by: ?

Mayordomo of Buenos Aires
- In office 1740–1741
- Preceded by: ?
- Succeeded by: ?

Escribano of the Real Asiento de Inglaterra
- In office 1716–1718
- Preceded by: ?
- Succeeded by: ?

Personal details
- Born: Miguel Antonio de Merlos y Jiménes; 1669 Murcia, Spain
- Died: c. 1744 Buenos Aires, Argentina
- Spouse: Rosa Martinez de Figueroa
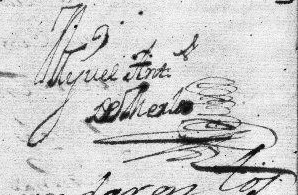
- Signature

Military service
- Allegiance: Spanish Empire
- Branch/service: Spanish Army
- Years of service: 1690s-1730s
- Rank: Sergeant major
- Unit: Fuerte de Buenos Aires
- Commands: Compañía de Guardias Españolas de Buenos Aires

Miguel Antonio de Merlos (1669-c.1744) was a Spanish military man and politician, who served during the colonial period of Buenos Aires. He held various positions, including Sargento Mayor of the Compañía of Guardias Españolas and Governor of the province of Porco.

== Biography ==
Miguel Antonio de Merlos was baptized on 20 January 1669 in the Parish of Santa Eulalia, the son of Diego de Merlos y Calvo and Estefanía Jiménez de los Ríos, belonging to Spanish noble families from Murcia. He did his studies in Spain and arrived at the Río de la Plata as a passenger of Capt. Francisco de Retama in 1691.

Installed in Buenos Aires, Merlos held various military and political positions, including as commander of the Fuerte de Buenos Aires. He also served as notary of the Real Asiento de Inglaterra, and held the position of Mayordomo of Buenos Aires in 1705 and 1740 (hierarchical position, concerning to managing the finances of the city).

His first public position in the Spanish domains of America was as governor of Porco (Potosí, Bolivia), appointed on 15 September 1708, during the viceroyalty of Manuel de Oms, 1st Marquis of Castelldosrius.

== Family ==
Miguel Antonio de Merlos was married in the Buenos Aires Cathedral to Rosa Martinez de Figueroa, daughter of Juan Martínez Guerrero and Leonor Ramírez de Arellano, belonging to an illustrious family of the Kingdom of Chile. He and his wife were the parents of Miguel Antonio de Merlos y Martínez, caballero of the Real Orden de Santiago, who served as alcalde of 2nd vote (vice-mayor) of Buenos Aires in 1735.
