= Real Asiento de Inglaterra =

Real Asiento de Inglaterra or Real Asiento de la Gran Bretaña was the name in Spanish of the subsidiary in Buenos Aires of the South Sea Company. In 1713, the British Crown established the asiento in the current Plaza San Martín, neighborhood of Retiro.

== History ==
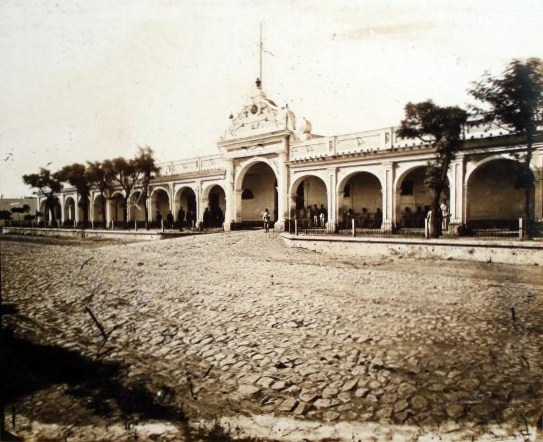
Cuartel del Retiro c. 1880, built on the land belonging to the Real Asiento de Inglaterra

After the Treaty of Utrecht, Spain granted the Asiento de Negros to Great Britain. The Real Asiento de Inglaterra of the South Sea Company was established in Buenos Aires around 1713, during the reign of Philip V of Spain and Anne, Queen of Great Britain. The treaty of 1713 permitted the annual arrival of 1,200 slaves in the port of Buenos Aires, mostly to be sent to the cities of Córdoba and Lima. The president of the Real Asiento de Inglaterra arrived in the Río de la Plata onboard the warship HMS Warwick in September 1715.

In 1718, Thomas Dover, president of the Real Asiento de Inglaterra of Buenos Aires, acquired the luxurious residence belonging to Miguel de Riglos. This residence had originally been owned by the Governor of Buenos Aires Agustín de Robles y Lorenzana. After acquiring that property, Riglos rented it to the Compagnie Royale de Guinée.

Several families belonging to the Buenos Aires society maintained commercial ties (sale of leather) with the Real Asiento de Inglaterra like Adrián Pedro Warnes, Francisco Rodríguez de Vida and Dionisio Chiclana Navarro. Joseph de Esparza, Miguel Gerónimo de Esparza and Juan de la Palma y Lobatón were some of the authorities of the Spanish government in charge of the control of the activities of the South Sea Company in Buenos Aires.

The South Sea Company operated in the Río de la Plata until 1739, the year in which Spain declared war against Great Britain. The Plaza de Toros del Retiro was built in 1800 on the former site of the Real Asiento de Inglaterra. Robert Young, Robert Fontaine and Robert Espren, pioneers in the practice of medicine of colonial Buenos Aires, arrived in the Río de la Plata on the ships of the Real Asiento de Inglaterra.

== Directory ==
- Thomas Dover, president
- Juan Thruppe, president since 1722
- Roberto Cross, directory
- Benito Thistlethwayte, directory
- Joseph de Lannoy, directory
- Guillermo Helps, directory
- Jeremías Mount, accountant
- Juan Mylan, surgeon
- Miguel Antonio de Merlos, notary in 1716

== Gallery ==
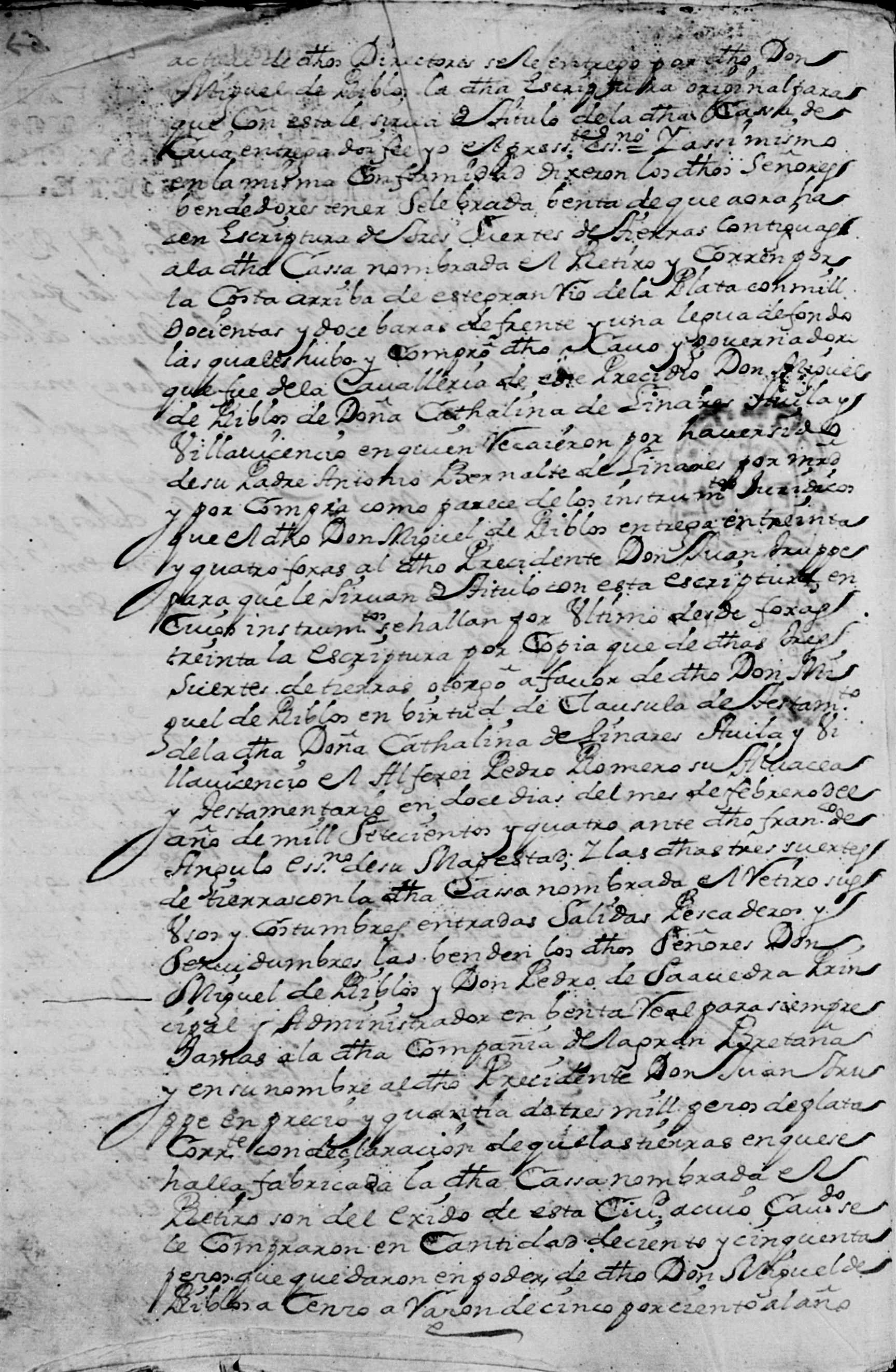
Sale of Miguel de Riglos to the company in 1718

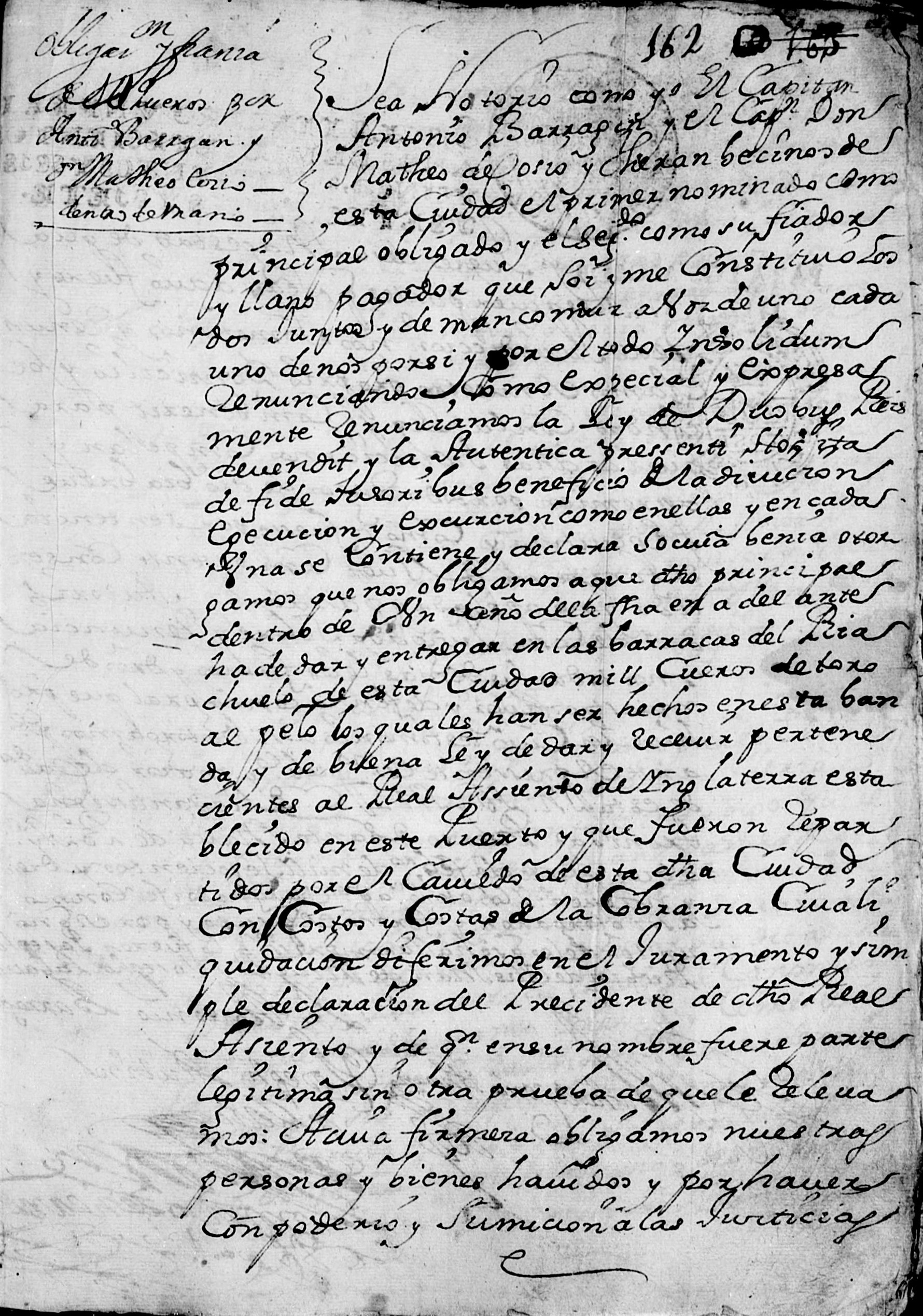
Record of leathers acquired by the Asiento de Inglaterra

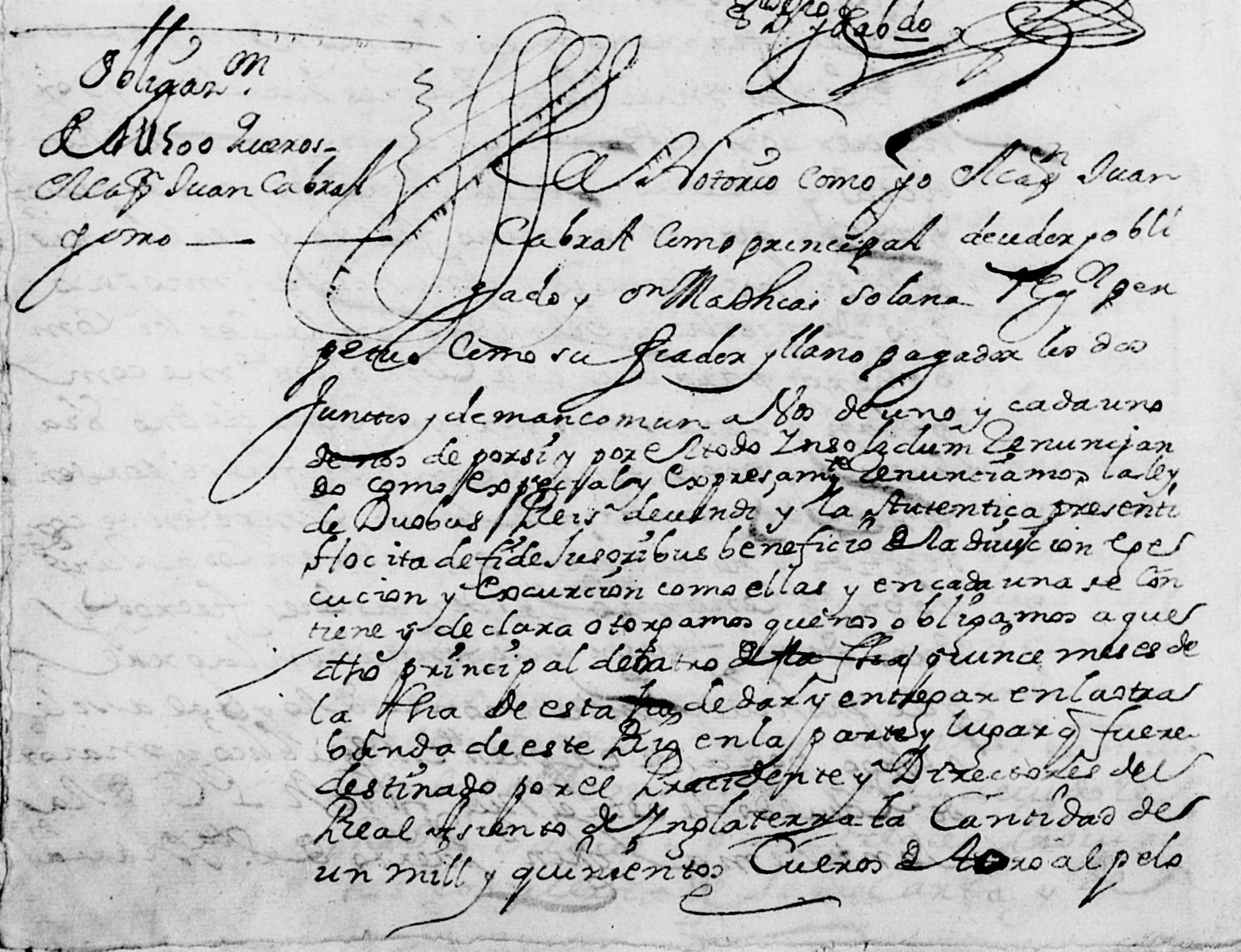
Leather debt of Juan Cabral de Melo to Company in 1718

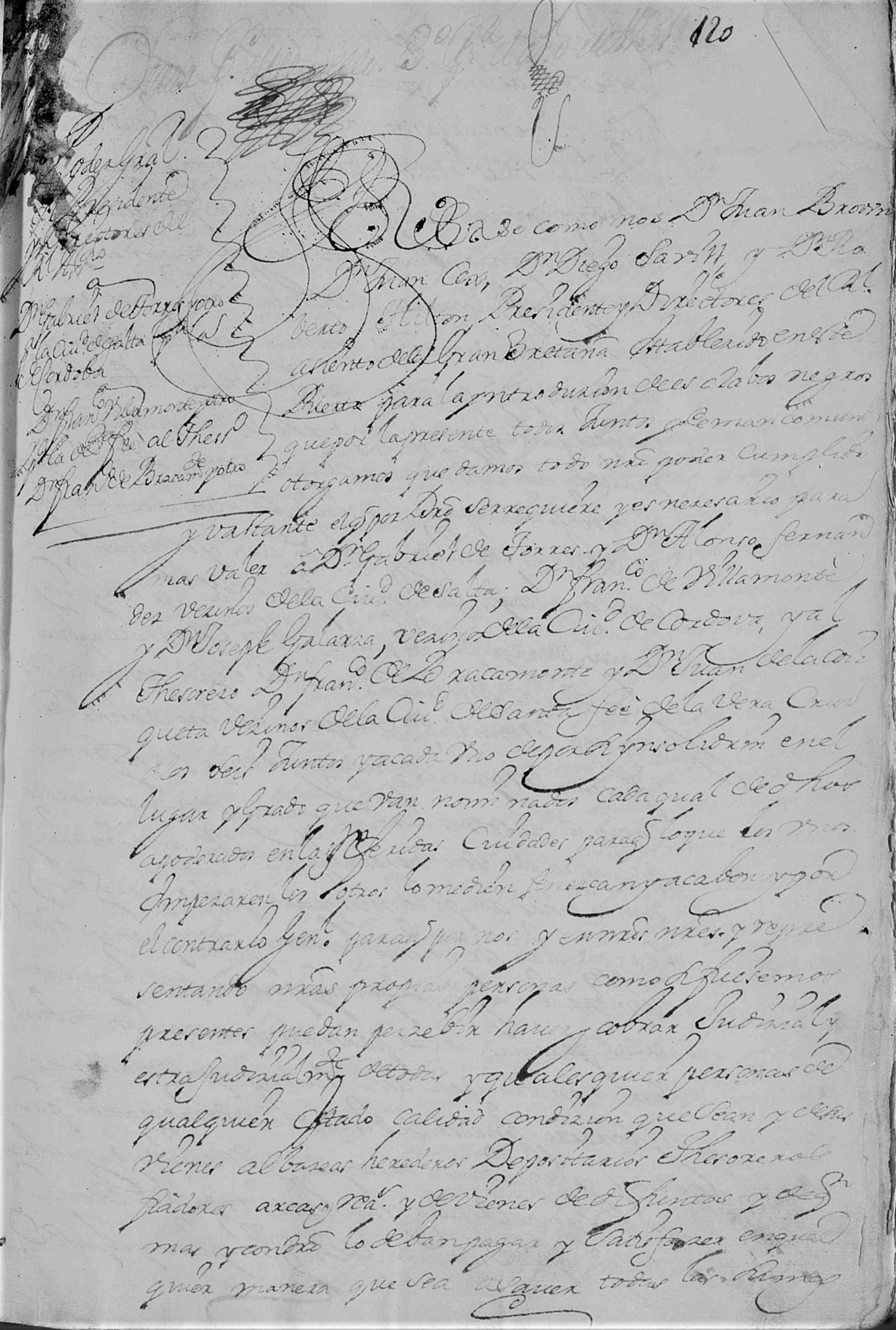
Appointment of proxies of the board in 1718

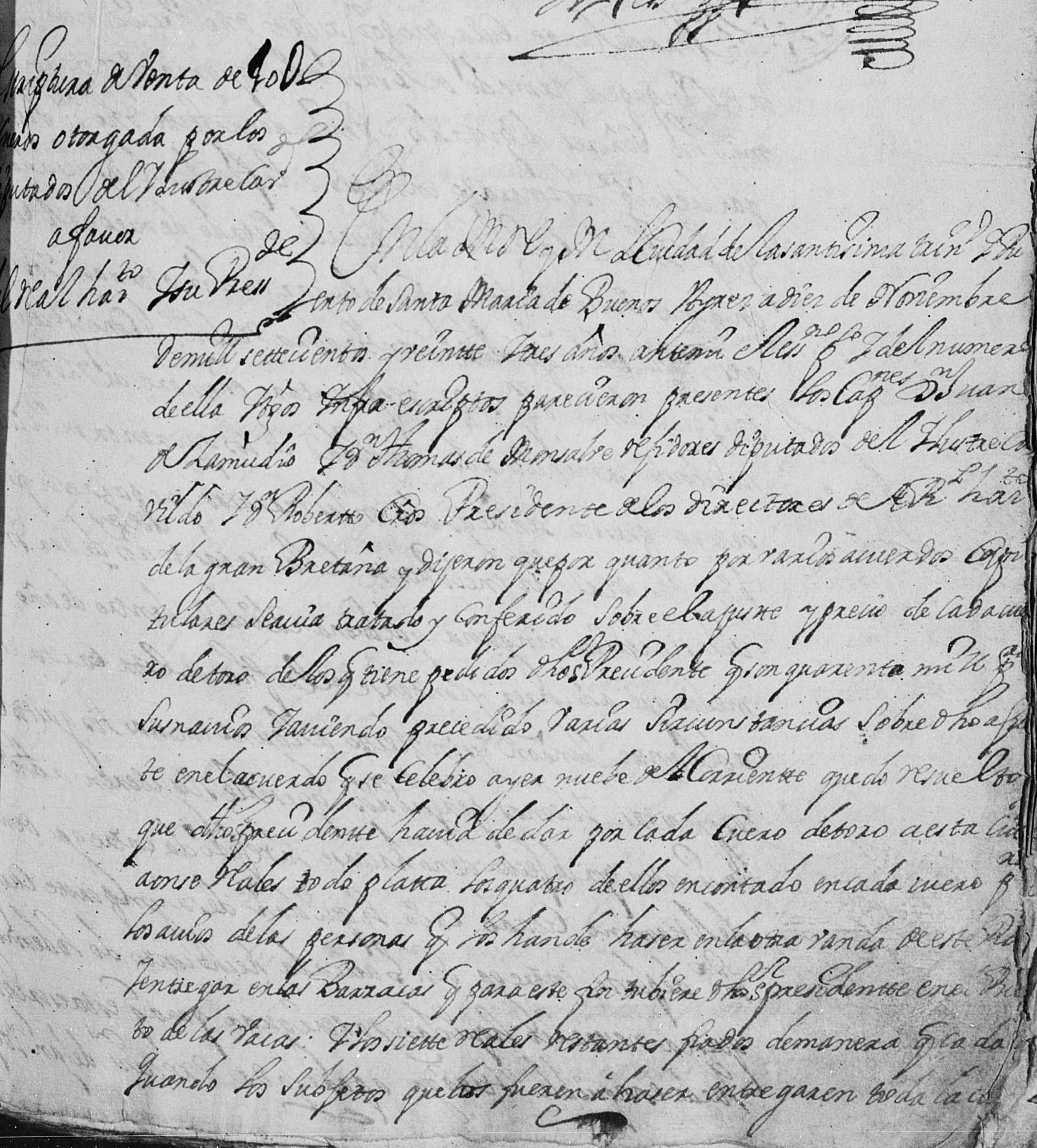
Registry of sales of the deputies of the Cabildo and the Asiento

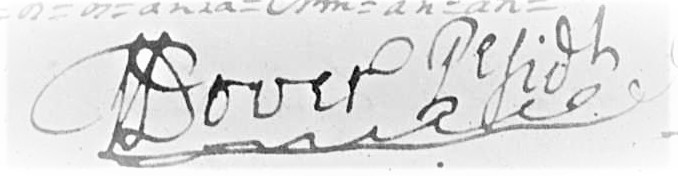
Signature of Thomas Dover, president of the company

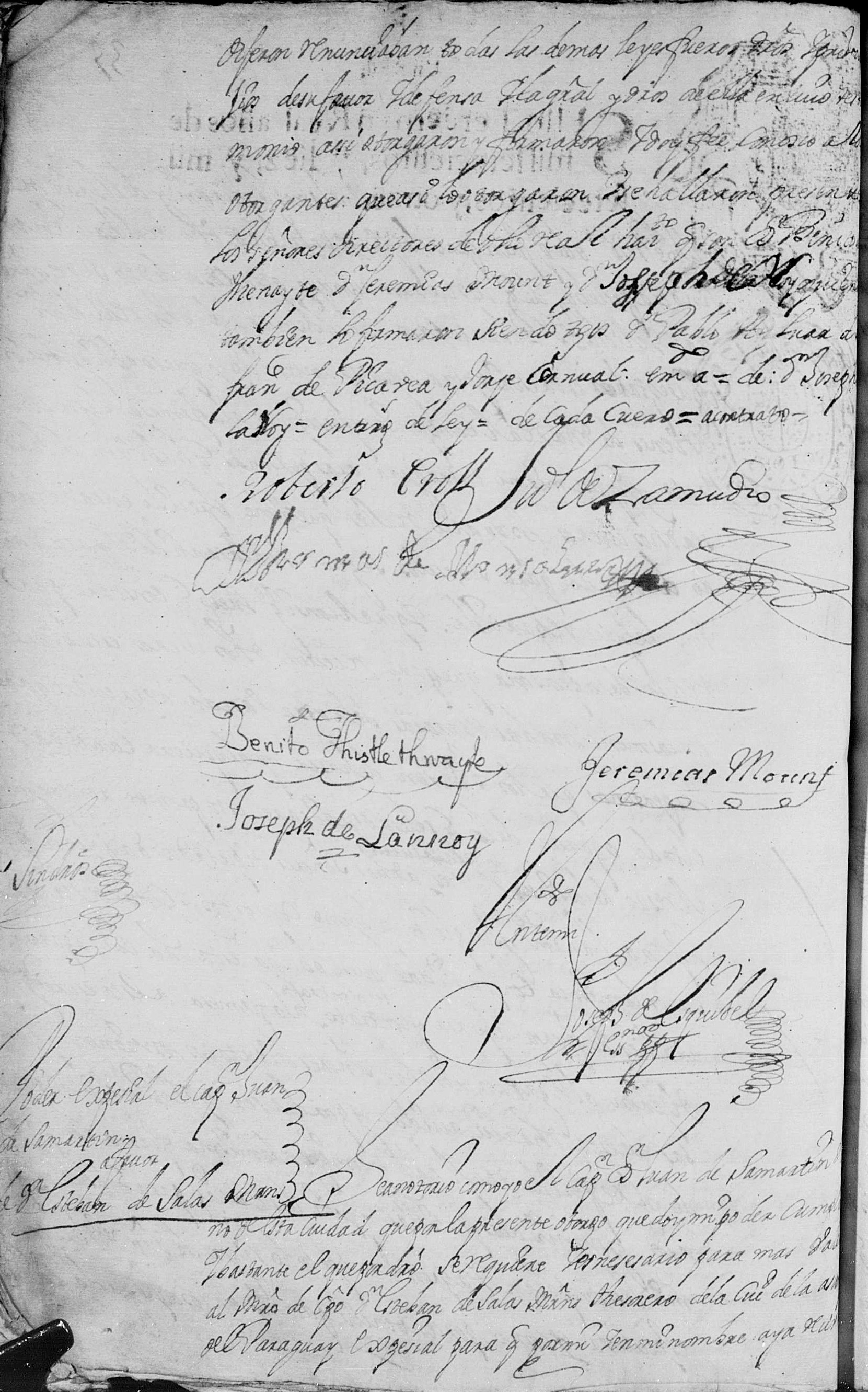
Record with signature of the main members of the Asiento
