= Santo Domingo Convent =

Coordinates: 34°36′47″S 58°22′18″W

- Convento de Santo Domingo
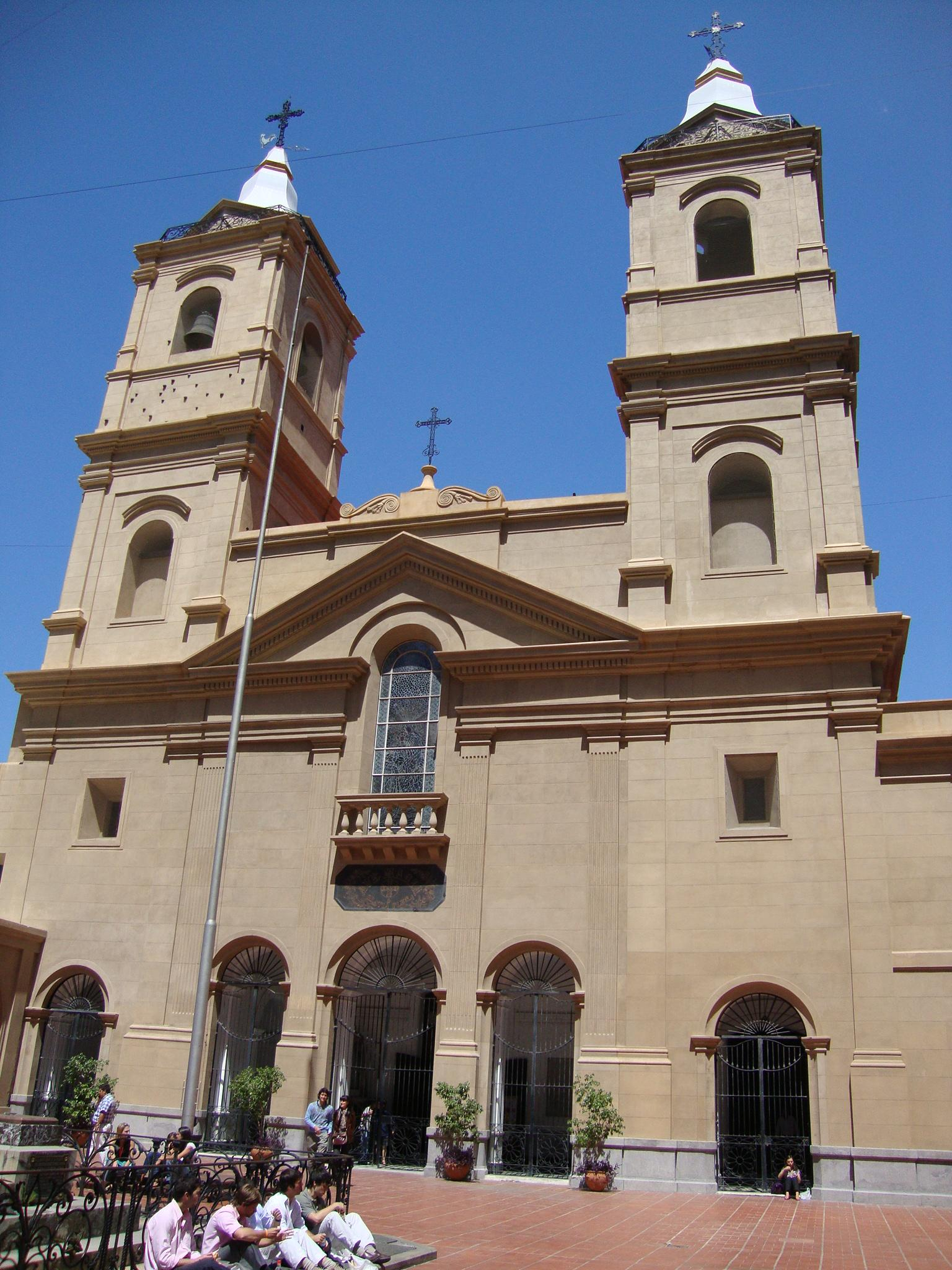
- Basilica of Our Lady of the Rosary and Convent of Santo Domingo.
- Santo Domingo Convent
- Country: Argentina
- Denomination: Catholic

History
- Status: Church
- Founded: 1856; 170 years ago

Architecture
- Functional status: Active
- Style: Neoclassical

Specifications
- Materials: Brick

The Santo Domingo Convent, or Basilica of Our Lady of the Rosary and Convent of Santo Domingo is a convent for Our Lady of the Rosary located in the Monserrat neighborhood of Buenos Aires. Built during the colonial times, it was the scenario of a military conflict during the British invasions of the Río de la Plata. It holds as well the tomb of the Argentine national hero Manuel Belgrano.

== History ==
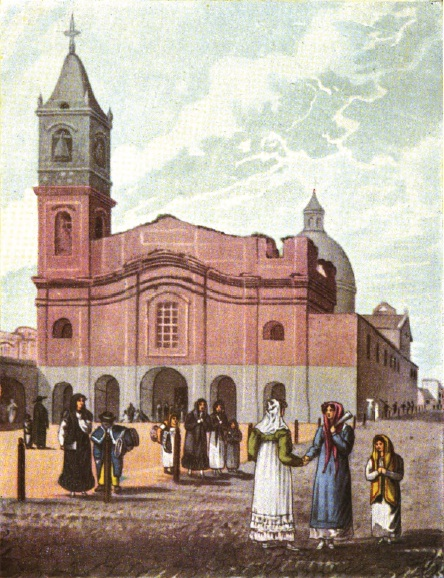
Depiction of the convent by Emeric Essex Vidal, 1817.

Although the Dominicans occupied the site since 1606, it was not until 1751 that they began to raise the present building, designed by the architect Antonio Masella Turin. On 29 June the stone foundation of the temple was laid, but the work did not progress steadily due to disagreements between the designer and the religious order. From 1762 until 1779 construction efforts were renewed by Don Juan de Lezica y Torrezuri as the main benefactor and director of the project. The unfinished church was consecrated on 17 October 1783, while architect Manuel Rocha Alvarez Masella continued the work. The following year the tower was completed.

On 11 February 1792, when the necessary donations were gathered, the foundation of the Convent of Santo Domingo began. It was concluded in 1805, as deduced from the absence of further records of expenses on the project.

On 27 June 1806 British troops under General William Beresford attacked Buenos Aires, which was not prepared to face the invasion. On Sunday 1 July, since no religious service would be given at the monastery, the captain Captain Santiago de Liniers and Brémont told Fray Gregorio Torres that should he receive the protection of the Virgin and retake the city, he would donate the invader's colors to the church. The invading force was defeated on the 12th of the month, and Liniers donated the flags on the 24th. They are since then kept at the church.

On 2 July 1807 the British attempted to seize Buenos Aires for the second time. The invaders took refuge in the east tower from where they offered resistance to the forces of the Tercio de Cántabros Montañeses militia unit, commanded by Colonel Pedro Andrés García, in what became known as the Battle of Santo Domingo. The tower was damaged by cannon fire and rebuilt afterwards. The original projectiles have been removed from the structure and replaced with commemorative pieces of wood representing the impacts.

In 1817, the English artist Emeric Essex Vidal visited the city and portrayed it in a series of watercolors. One which included the Church of Santo Domingo. He would comment that the building "(...) is in a state of disrepair, and has nothing noteworthy except for the colors and a fine organ."

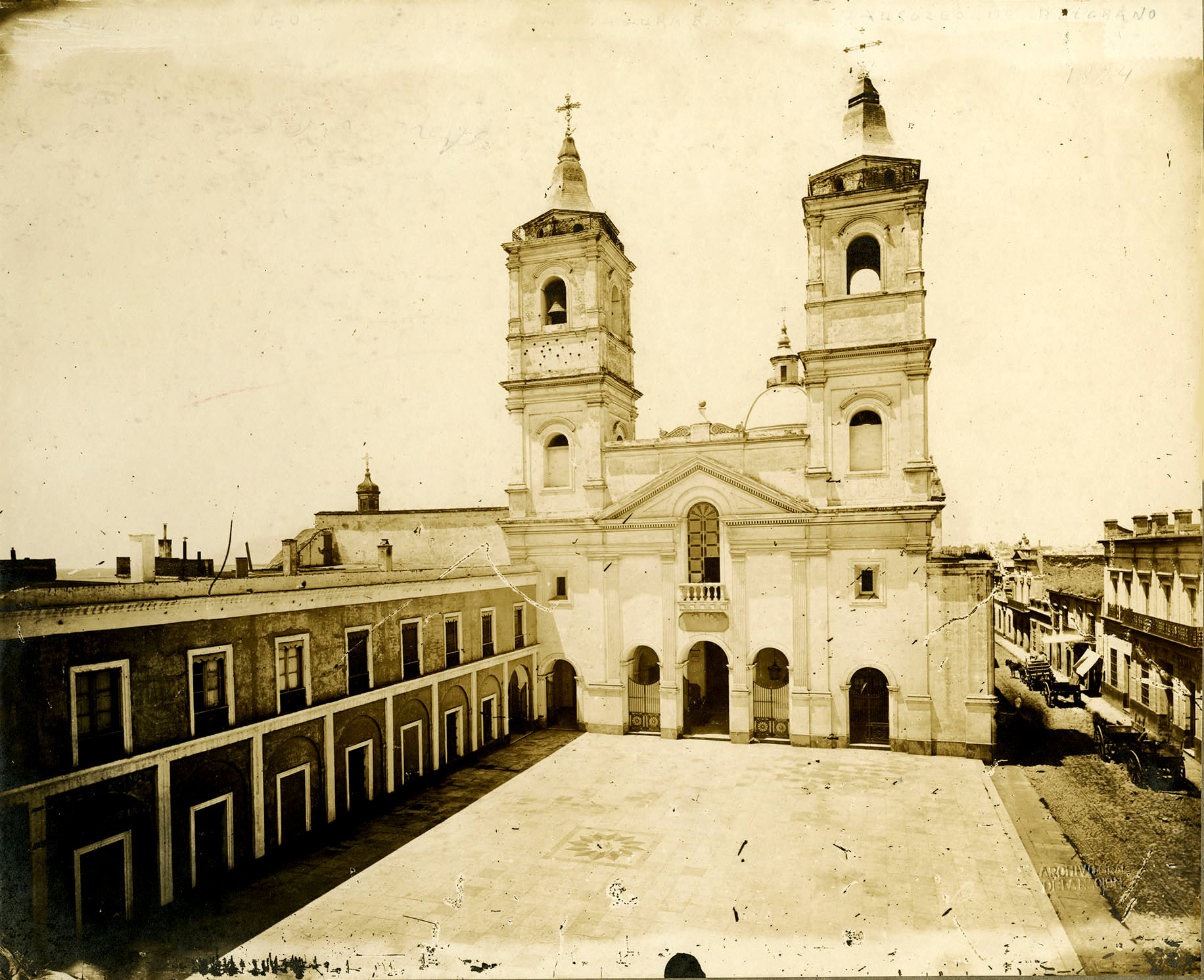
The convent photographed in 1900.

During the rule of president Bernardino Rivadavia the Dominicans were expelled from the country. The building became a Natural History Museum in 1826, under the direction of Italian chemist and botanist Pablo Ferrari. It The museum used to contain some 800 pieces of the animal kingdom, 1500 minerals and an unknown number of plants, as well as a numismatic collection of over 1500 pieces. In the upper part of the church an astronomical observatory was built, and a meteorological office was run by another Italian scientist, Octavio Fabrizio Mossotti, who would also between 1828 and 1834 give lectures on physics. Unfortunately, due to the general disinterest in science most of the meteorological records were lost, some of which were used by Humboldt and found their way to the Institute of France. Mossotti's observations on a solar eclipse and the comet Encke were published by the Royal Astronomical Society of London.

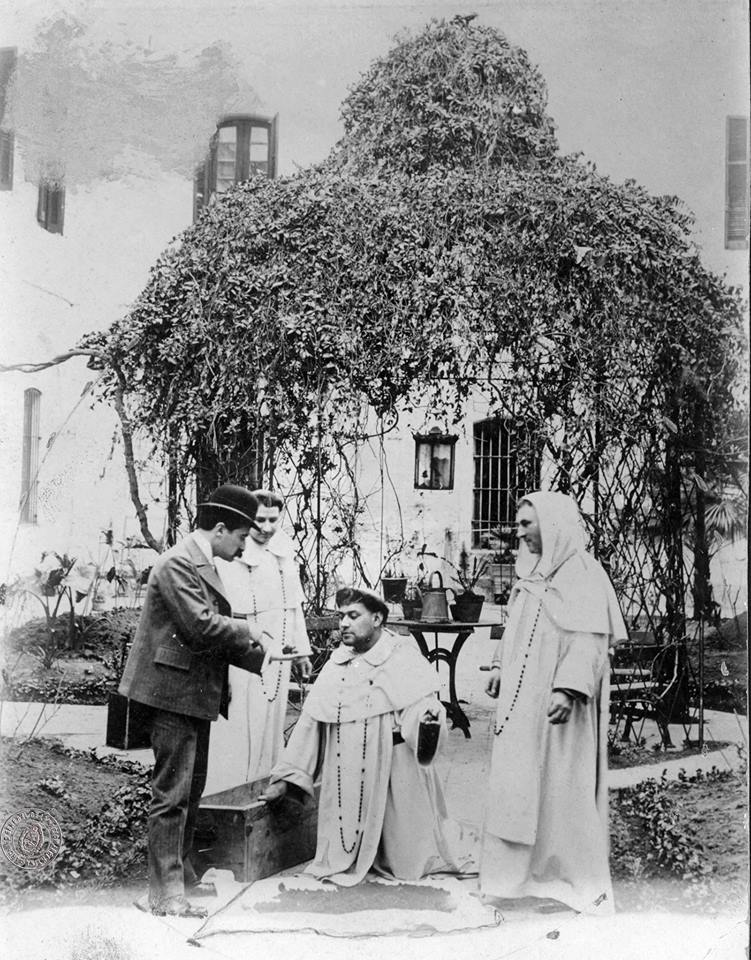
The ashes from Manuel Belgrano's body, after being exhumed from the church's atrium, 1902.

On 22 October 1835 President Rosas personally issued a decree allowing the Dominicans to return to the country and recover the convent. In virtue of this resolution Rosas was named a brother of the Dominican order. Despite the return of the monks the Museum of Natural History continued to operate in the building until 1854.

In 1849 the west tower was completed. The basement behind the presbytery dates of 1873, the vestry and the chapels of San Vicente and Rosario of 1885. In 1894 the architects Auguste Plou and Oliver reformed the temple, modifying the original crown and giving it its current pediment.

A mausoleum was opened in 1903 by the sculptor Ettore Ximenes and located in the temple courtyard, houses the remains of Manuel Belgrano, who was buried in the habit of the Dominican order. These were first buried under a slab at the entrance of the church, the general will and testament, which belonged to the Third Order of St. Dominic. They are also buried in the convent of the remains of General Belgrano parents, for the generous contributions that had favored the temple and the remains of General Antonio González Balcarce, Hilarion de la Quintana. A plaque reminds Martín de Álzaga, although his remains are in the Recoleta Cemetery in the vault familiar.

In 1910 the convent was elevated to the rank of Basilica by Pope Pius X. The church 8 October 1922 the image of Nuestra Señora del Rosario received a papal coronation procession was a great celebration. By a decree signed on 21 May 1942 the Convent was declared a Historic Monument Nacional.

During the burning of churches on 16 June 1955 it was burned and looted, losing most of the documents and relics. A restoration project was begun in 1961 after the destruction.

== Description ==
The Basilica of Nuestra Señora del Rosario has three naves, the central one has a barrel vault and a dome over the crossing. It is 70 meters long (including the nartex; 64.80 without it) and 28.50 meters wide.

Highlights the Spanish colonial style bars in the atrium, starring Manuel Belgrano's mausoleum, also remaining at the entrance to the church, which is composed of three arches leading to the narthex trellises. On each side, two doors, one on each tower, take to the aisles. Behind the altar of the aisle that the flags of the British battalions shown.

On the inside, its columns are decorated with reliefs, and the nave was clad in carved marble. The existing main altar was made after the fire the old, burned in 1955 The roofs of the vaults are in an advanced state of deterioration, and prevent accidents plaster detachments product and material has been placed few meters down a network of these.

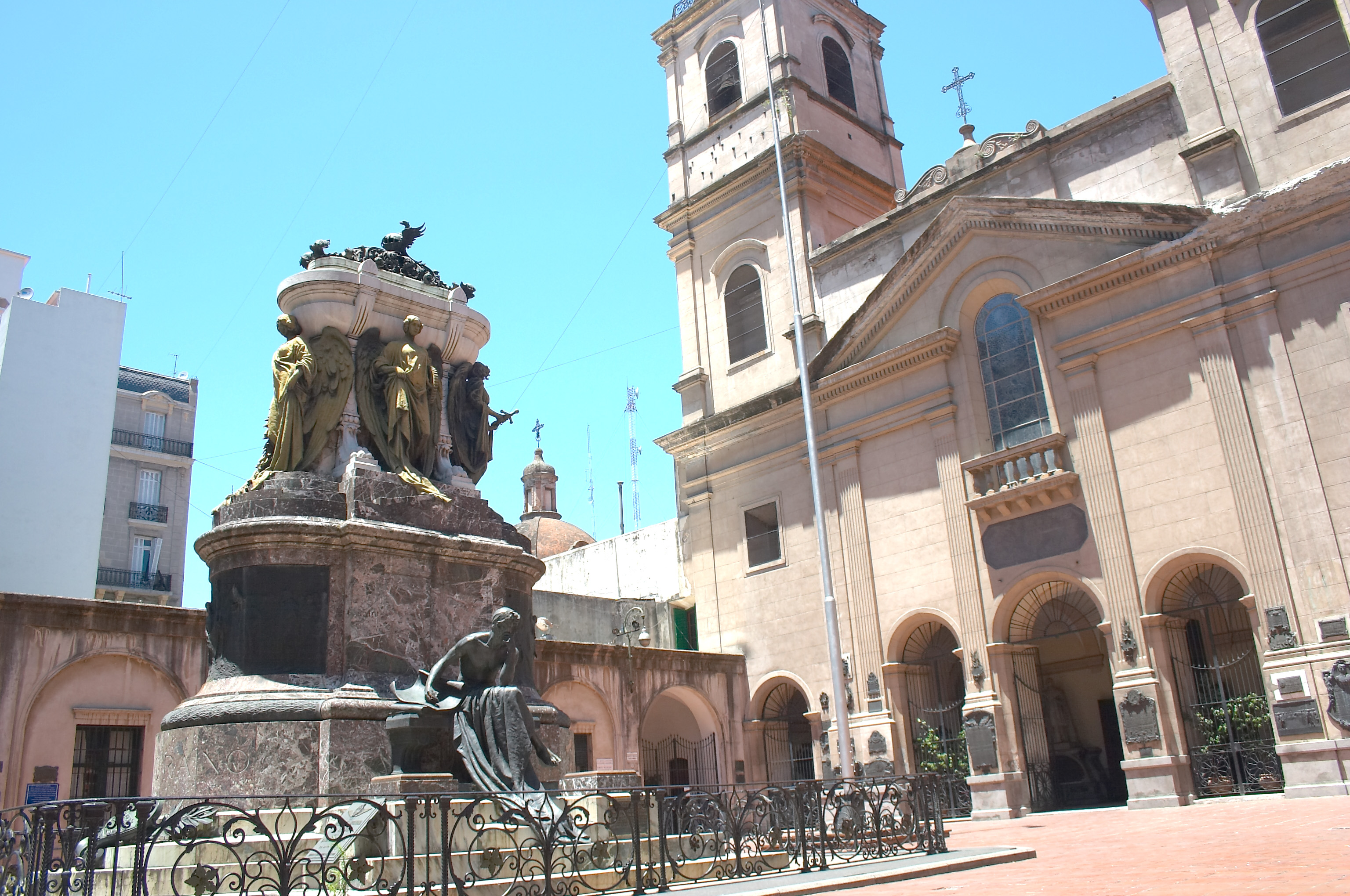
View of the convent and Manuel Belgrano's mausoleum (at left).

The confessionals were made of marble, with carved wooden doors and alternate inscriptions over their doors, "Noli Amplius peccare" and "Give iniquitatem meam". "Verbum Dei Praedica" appears on access to the pulpit.

The basilica has many chapels with images of saints such as St. Martin de Porres, and several plaques in memory of heroes who participated in the Defense and Reconquista during the British invasions of important members of the order and of famous people who are buried in it. For example, Fray José del Rosario Zemborain, Nevares Trespalacios Alejo, José Matías Zapiola, Luis Maria Saavedra and his wife, among others.

Several plates recall the procession held in 1922, including one that replicates a photograph of the crowd coming from the Plaza de Mayo in front of the Cathedral. A particular plate contains the text of the decree signed on 10 October 1926 by President Marcelo Torcuato de Alvear, allowing display the flag of War of Argentina with this image of Our Lady of the Rosary.

On a vane on the right tower is a figure of a dog as the Dominicans are named from the Latin Domini canis (dogs or guardians of the Lord). On the left is the traditional vane silhouette of a gallo.

The building had an organ built in France by the house Mutin Cavaillé-Coll, which was destroyed in 1955 during the aforementioned burning churches. Years later, another body of German origin was located where the altar was installed, but it was not completely finished, and is estimated to run a 60% lack thereof. Today, I still run at maximum capacity, rarely reaches to fill the spacious nave with its volume, but nevertheless presents an architectural contrast gives counterpoint to colonial style building with a modern instrument of the 1960s, which is what first thing a visitor sees when entering the temple.

== Gallery ==
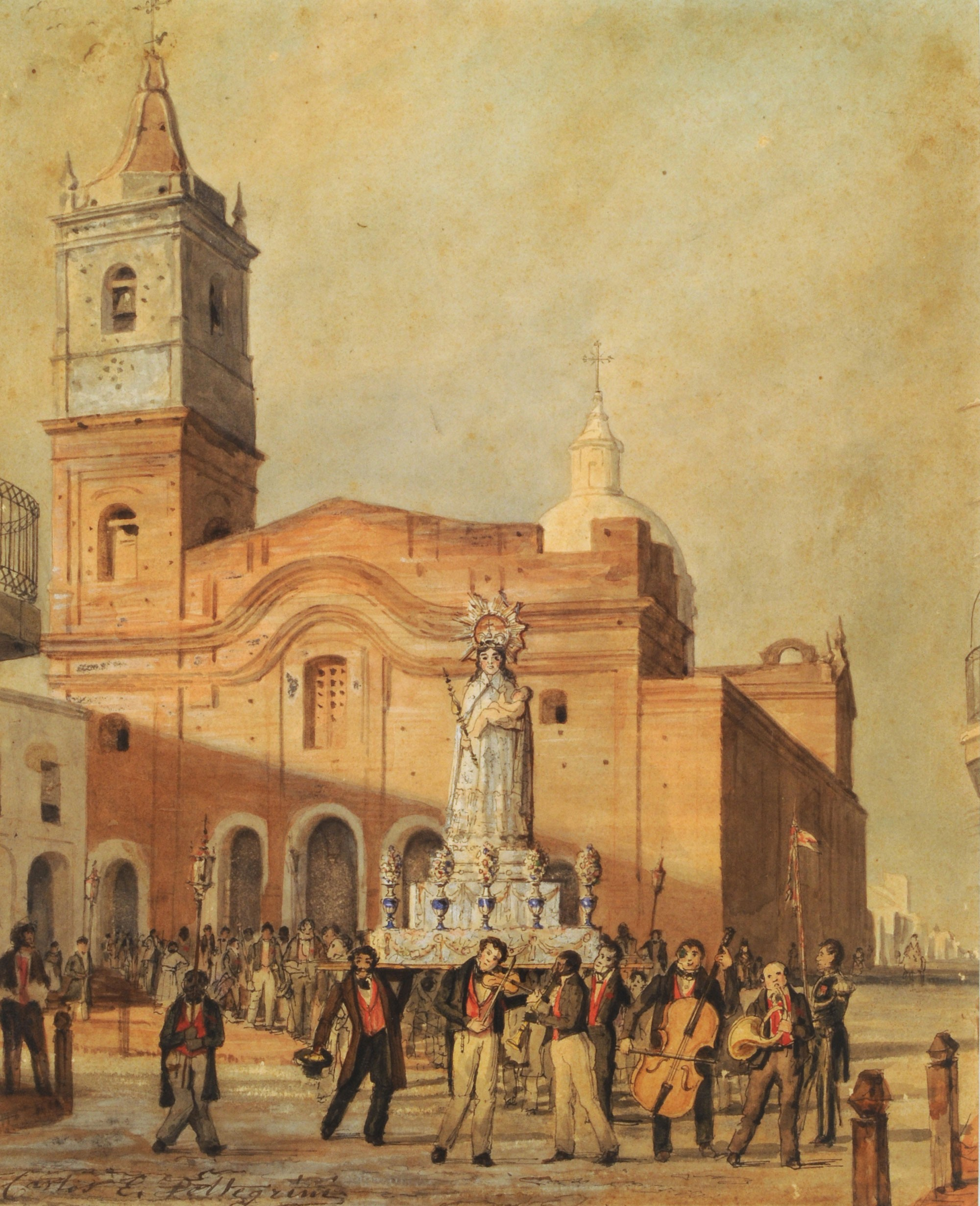
The temple in the mid-19th. century.

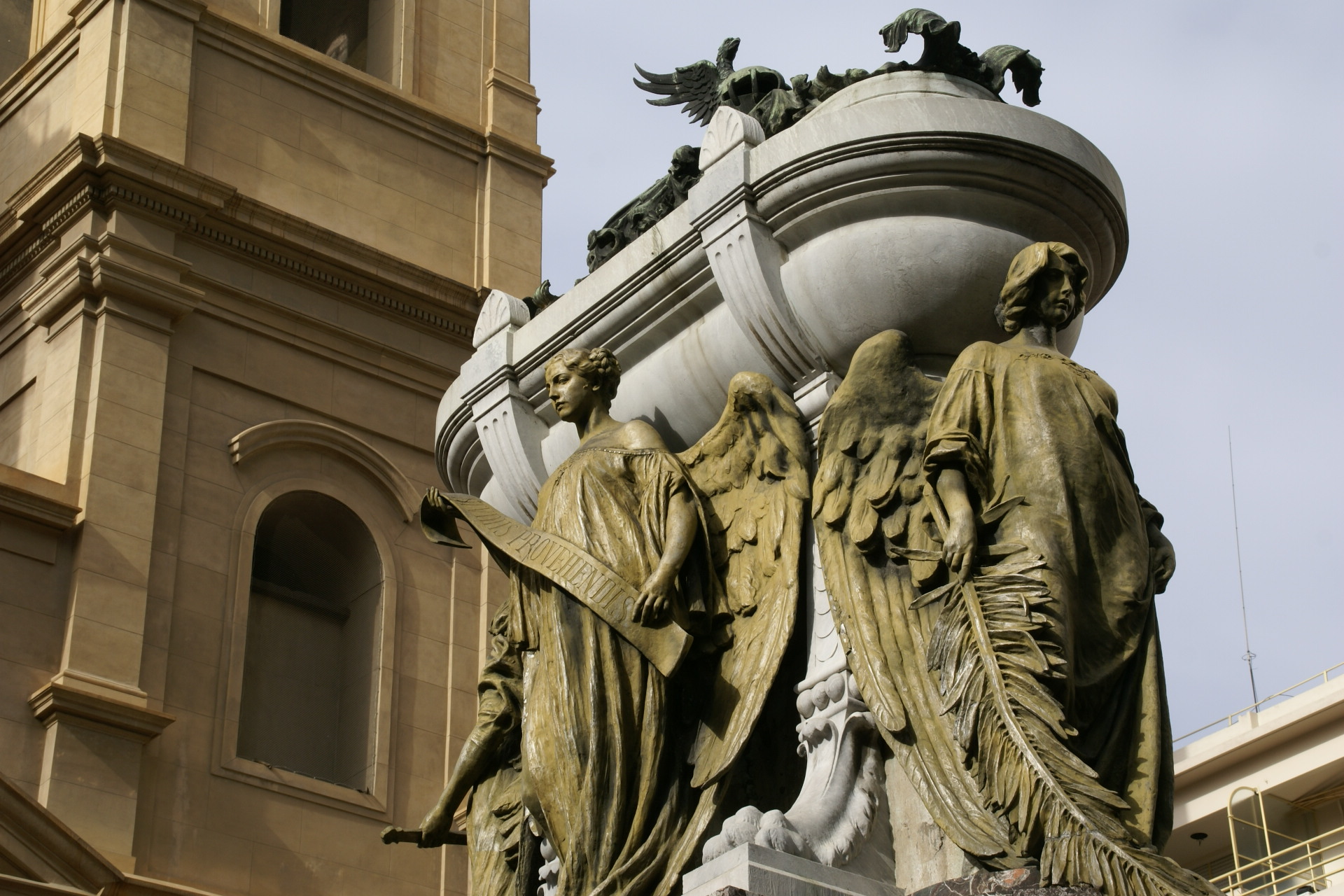
Manuel Belgrano's mausoleum.

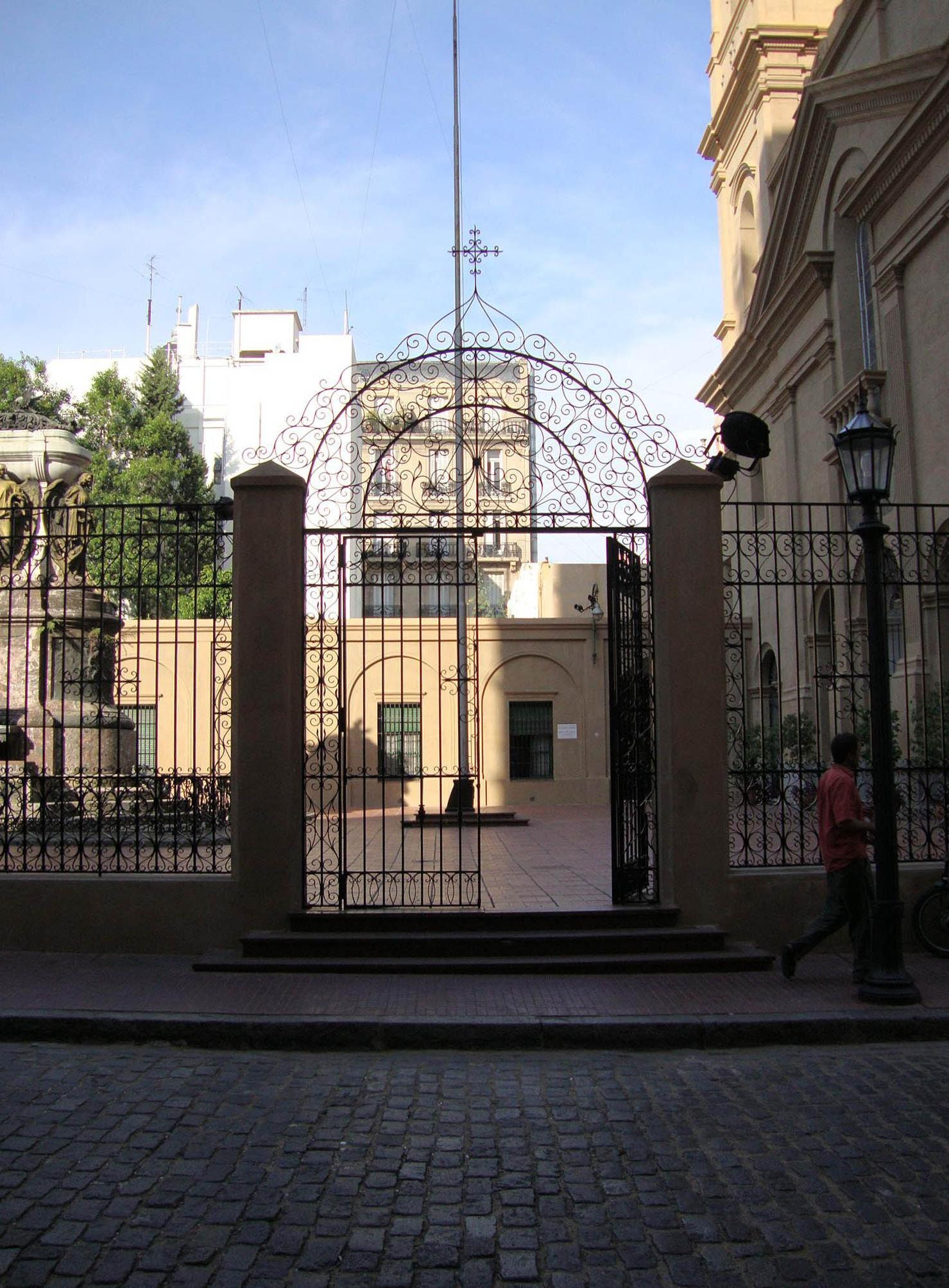
Main entrance.

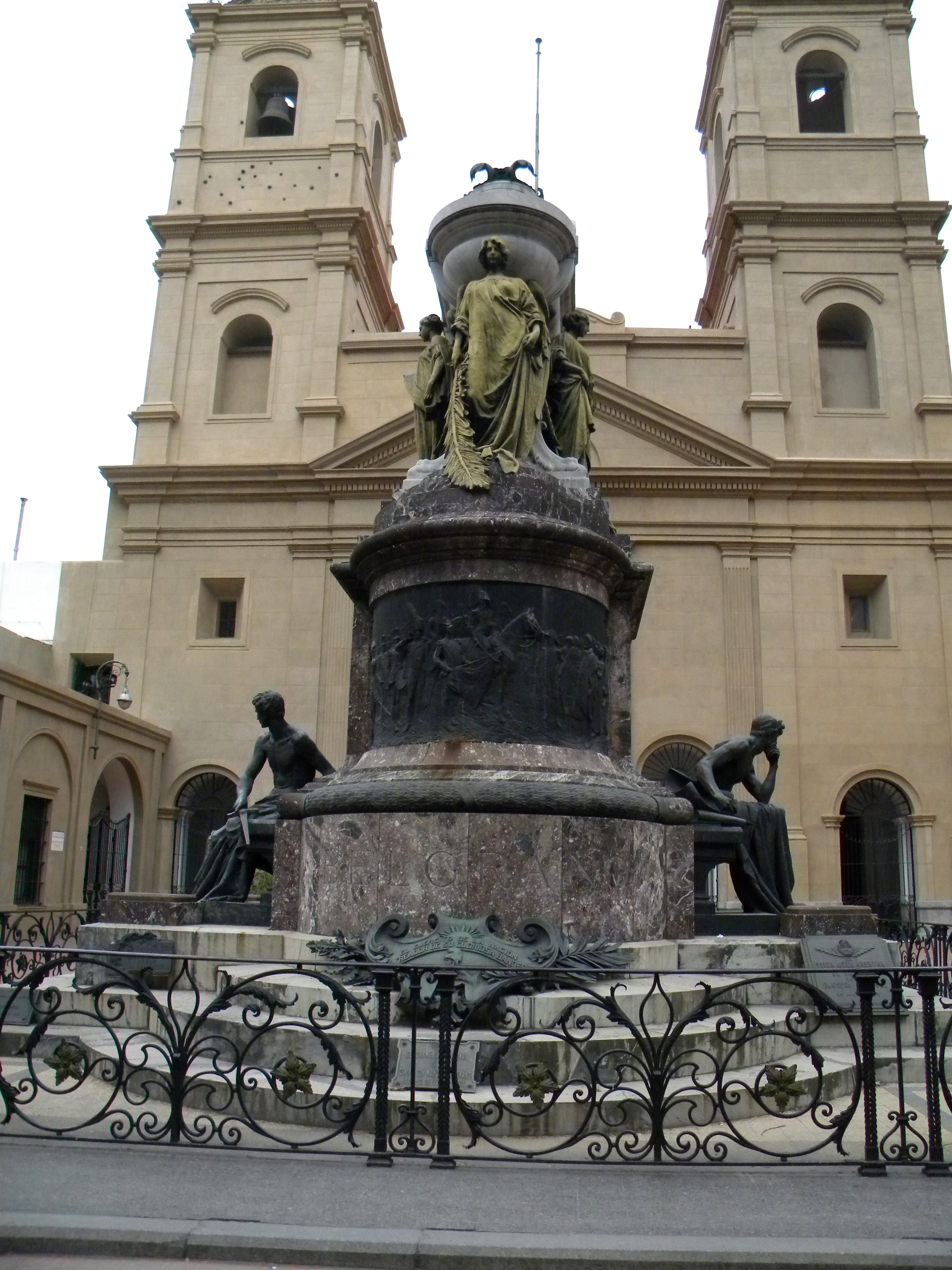
Manuel Belgrano's mausoleum.

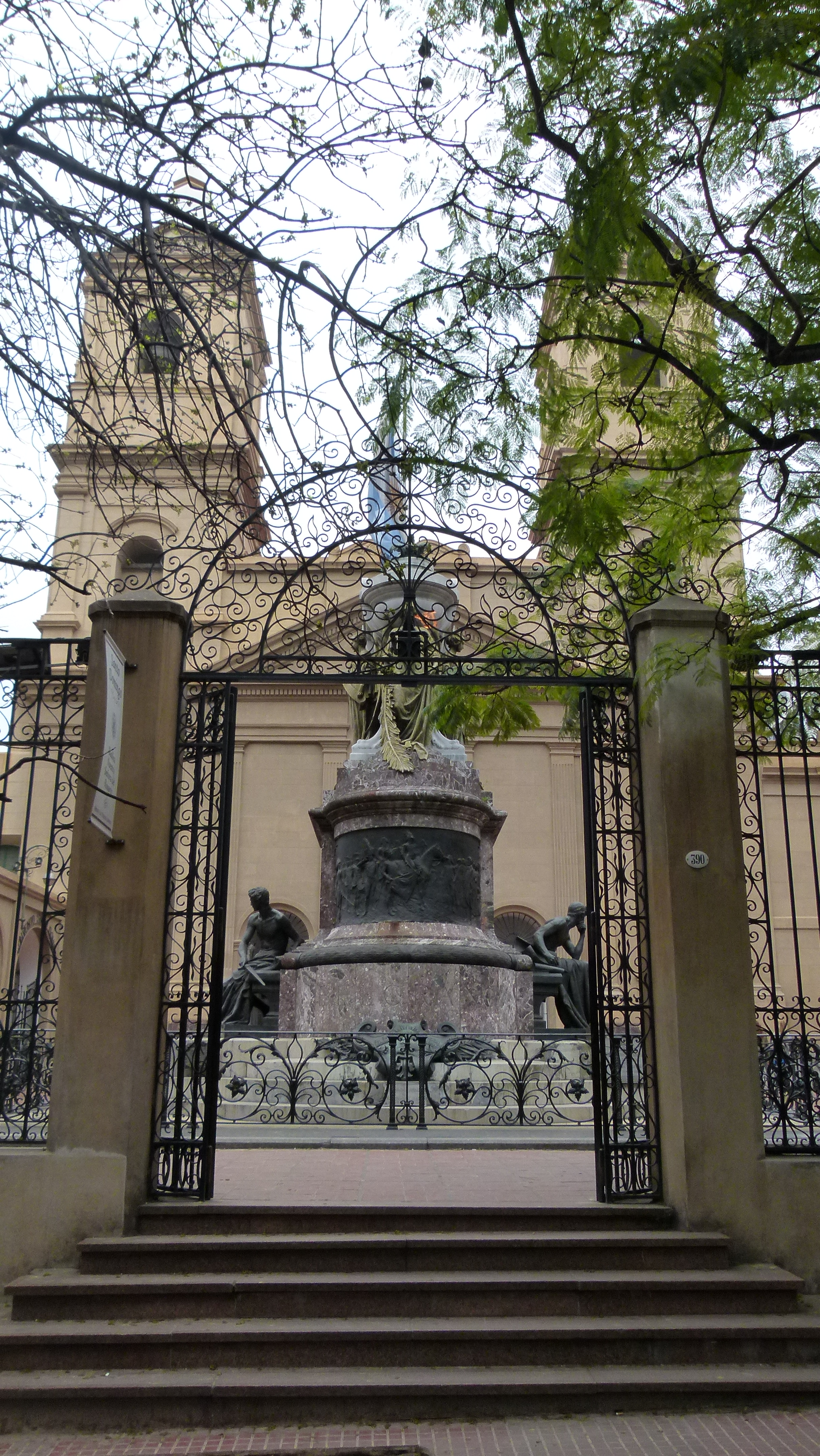
Manuel Belgrano's tomb

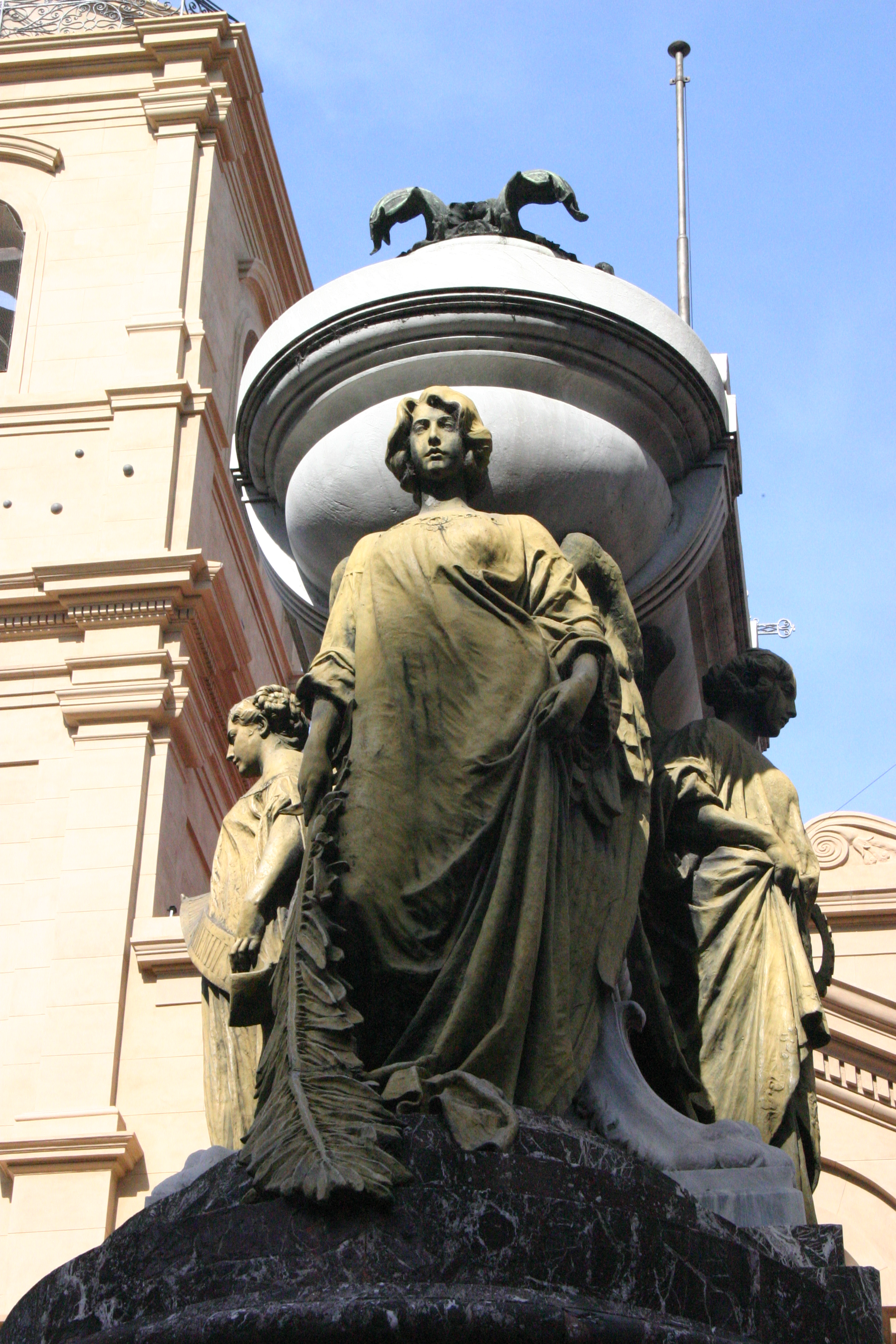

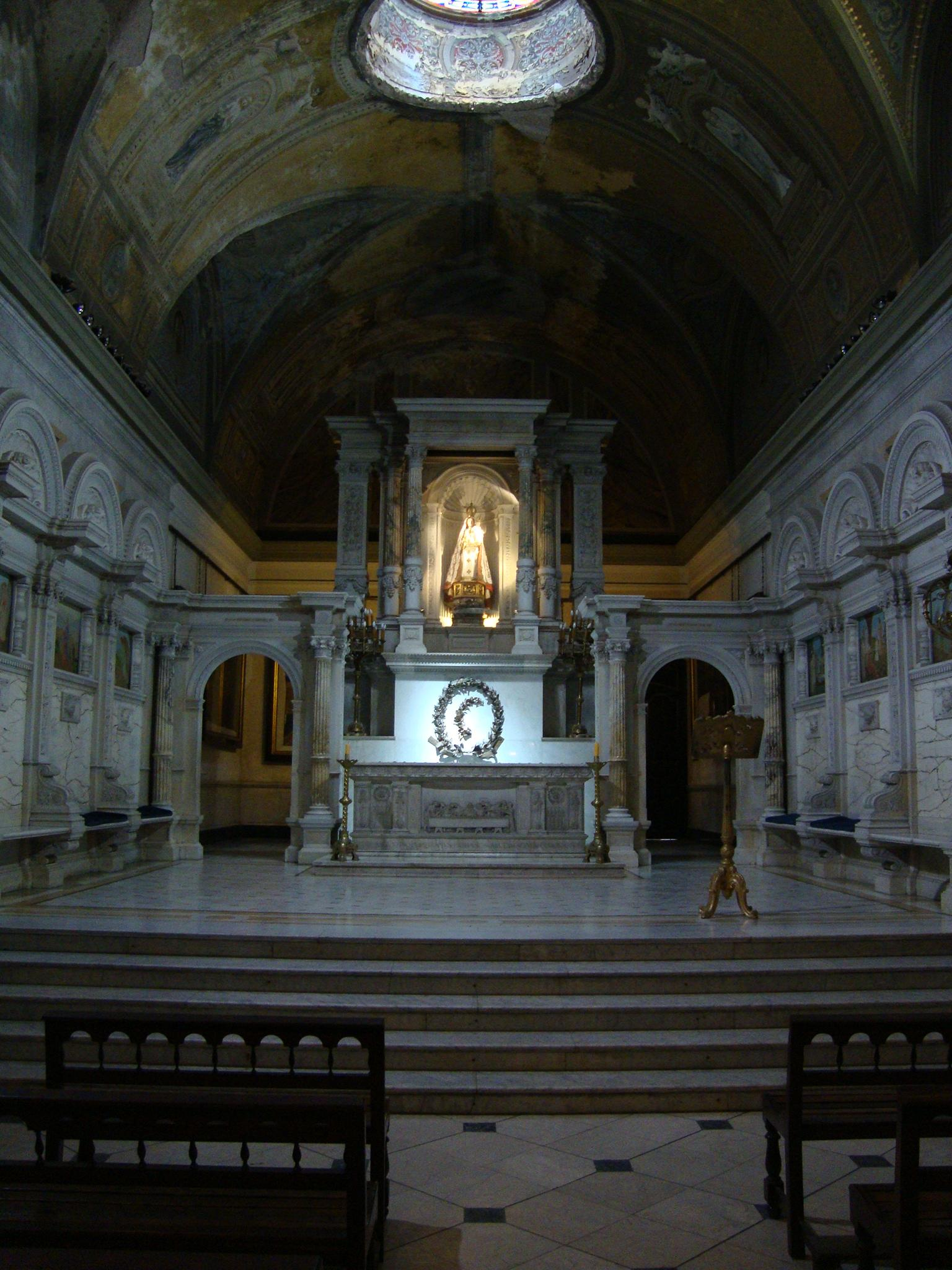
Lateral nave.
