= Juan de Lezica y Torrezuri =

Spanish nobleman, politician and merchant

Don Juan de Lezica y Torrezuri
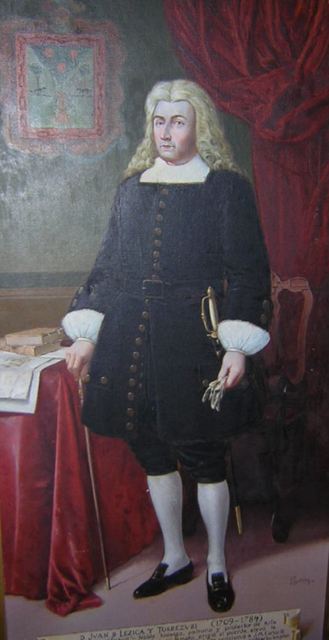

Mayor of Buenos Aires
- In office 1766–1767
- Monarch: Charles III of Spain
- Preceded by: Eugenio Lerdo de Tejada
- Succeeded by: Vicente de Azcuénaga

Personal details
- Born: July 26, 1709 Biscay, Spain
- Died: April 11, 1784 (aged 74) Buenos Aires, Argentina
- Resting place: Santo Domingo convent
- Occupation: Politician
- Profession: architect engineer
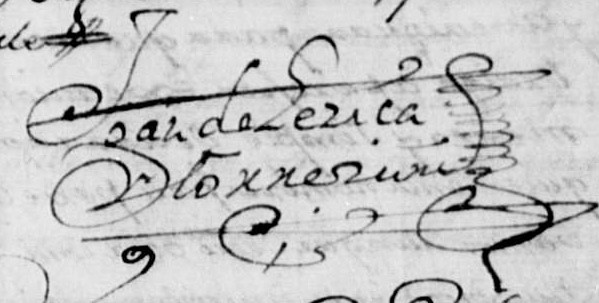
- Signature

Military service
- Allegiance: Spanish Empire
- Branch/service: Spanish Army
- Commands: "La Atrevida"

Juan de Lezica y Torrezuri (1709–1784) was a Spanish nobleman, politician and merchant, who served as alcalde and regidor of Buenos Aires.

== Biography ==
He was born in Cortézubi, Vizcaya, Spain, the son of Juan de Lezica y Gaçeaga and María de Torrezuri, belonging to a noble family of Basque roots. He was married to Elena de Alquiza y Peñaranda, born in La Paz daughter of Felipe de Alquiza and Juana María de Peñaranda.

Among other duties of public official, Juan de Lezica y Torrezuri was the commander of "La Atrevida", a militia of the Cuerpo de Blandengues de la Frontera de Buenos Aires, in charge of punitive expeditions against infidel Indians. He also served as mayor of 1st vote of Buenos Aires and of La Paz. In 1755, he founded the town of Luján.
