= Vicente de Azcuénaga =

Argentine businessman and politician (1706–1787)

Vicente de Azcuénaga Iturbe
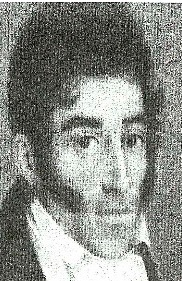
- Image of Vicente Azcuénaga

Alcalde of 1st vote of Buenos Aires
- In office 1767–1768
- Monarch: Charles III of Spain
- Preceded by: Juan de Lezica y Torrezuri
- Succeeded by: Joseph de Lezica

Personal details
- Born: 1706 Biscay, Spain
- Died: 1787 (aged 80–81) Buenos Aires, Argentina
- Spouse: María Rosa de Basavilbaso y Urtubia
- Occupation: Politician merchant
- Profession: Sailor
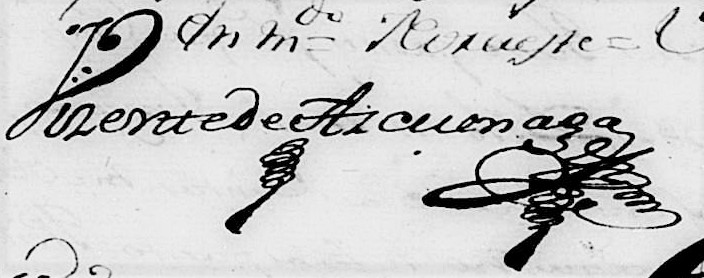
- Signature

Military service
- Allegiance: Spain
- Branch/service: Spanish Navy
- Years of service: c.1726-1730s
- Rank: Maestre

Vicente de Azcuénaga Iturbe (January 1706 – 1787) was a Spanish-born Argentine businessman and politician.

From Durango, Vizcaya, Spain, he arrived in Buenos Aires in his early forties and was devoted to commercial activities. He proved to be a successful trader which enabled him to amass a small fortune in a short time. He maintained a strong friendship with Francisco Ugarte, another great merchant of the time.

In Argentina Azcuénaga was also treated as a Spanish noble. He was elected Mayor of the Town of Buenos Aires in 1759. In 1760, he was appointed ruler of the Cabildo. In 1774 he was appointed Trustee of Commerce of San Francisco.

He married María Rosa de Basavilbaso y Urtubia (daughter of Domingo de Basavilbaso) on August 30, 1752. Vincent de Azcuénaga had seven children, three of whom spent time in the Argentine military, while another was an attorney.
