= Roberto Young =

Scottish medical doctor

Robert Young

Personal details
- Born: c.1700 Scotland, Kingdom of Great Britain
- Died: 1743 Buenos Aires, Viceroyalty of Peru
- Occupation: Medicine
- Profession: Physician

Robert Young (1700s–1743) was a Scottish doctor of medicine, who was employed by the South Sea Company in Buenos Aires.

== Biography ==
Young was born in Scotland, the son of Alexander Young and Margaret Bucanan. He was graduated in medicine in Spain, and arrived at the port of Buenos Aires aboard a ship belonging to the South Sea Company, company that had its facilities in the area of Retiro.

After leaving the Royal English Company, he was hired by the Viceregal Authorities who assigned them to serve in the Fort of Buenos Aires. Young who professed the Protestant religion converted to Catholicism in 1737.

In Buenos Aires, Roberto Young had exercised the profession of surgeon with Robert Fontaine and Robert Espren, known as the three "Robert". He had the first Brewery installed in the city. The company used slaves for packaging of the beer. This action earned him a fine imposed by the Governor of Buenos Aires against Robert Young.

Robert Young died in 1743 and bequeathed all his property to the Jesuits of Buenos Aires.
