= Agustín Ibáñez y Bojons =

Spanish military officer, engineer, and cartographer

- Born: September 1771; Gondomar, Spain
- Died: May 1805 (aged 33); Ceuta, Spain
- Military career
- Allegiance: Spanish Empire
- Branch: Spanish Army
- Service years: c. 1790–1805
- Rank: Lieutenant colonel
- Known for: Cartographic work in the Viceroyalty of the Río de la Plata

Agustín Ibáñez y Bojons (also spelled Bofons and Matamoros) (San Miguel de Peitieiros, Gondomar, Pontevedra; September 1771 – Ceuta; May 1805) was a Spanish military officer, engineer, and cartographer who reached the rank of lieutenant colonel. He served in the Spanish Army and died in Ceuta while still in service. He was the author of several maps, mainly of South America, which are kept in the Archivo General de Indias and the Biblioteca Nacional de España. Among his works are various maps of different sites in the Viceroyalty of the Río de la Plata at the end of the 18th century, such as the port of Montevideo, coastal areas, and boundary demarcations between Spanish and Portuguese territories.

== Biography ==
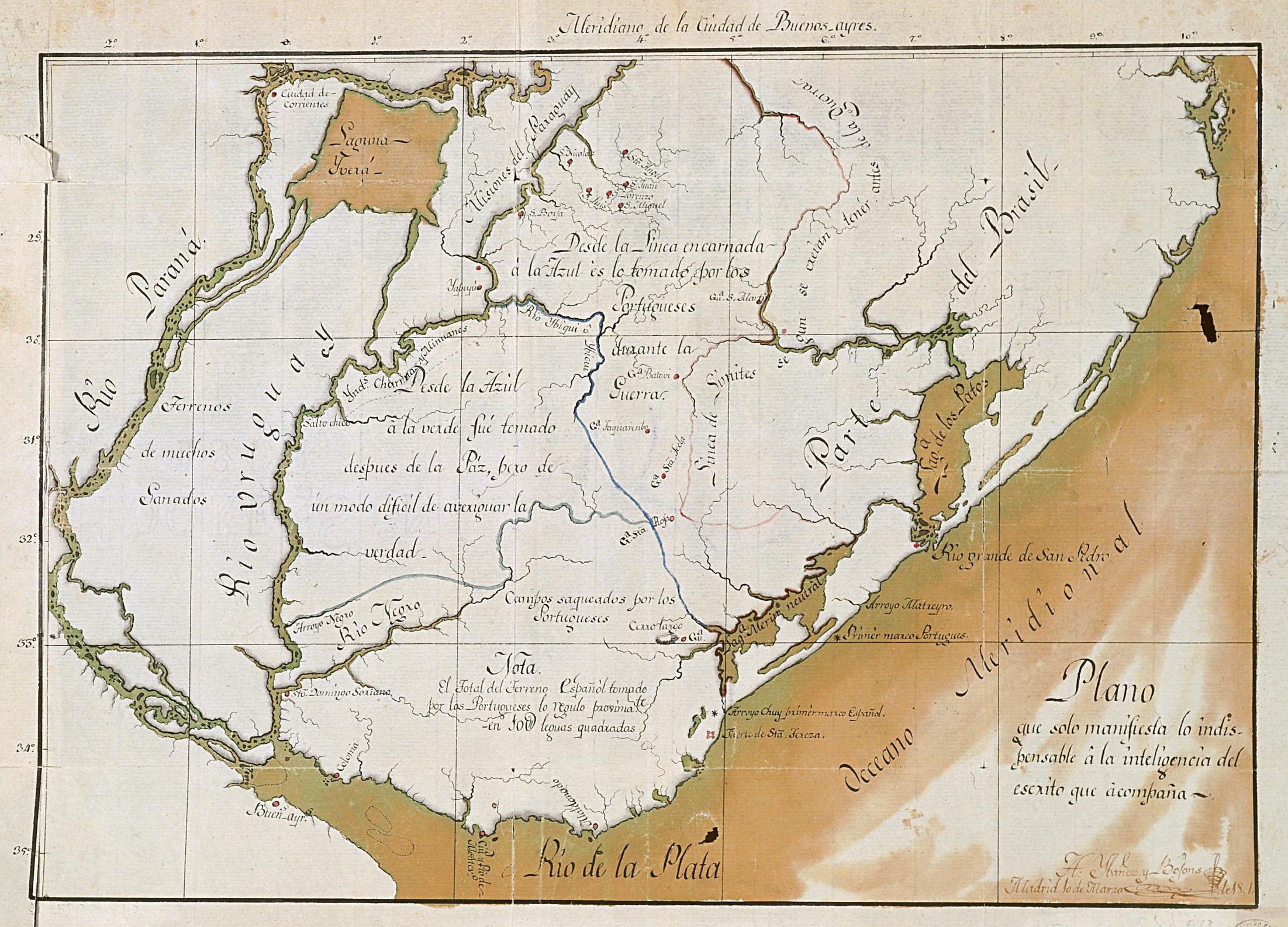
Map of the lands occupied by the Portuguese in the Viceroyalty of Buenos Aires during the War of the Oranges (1801), made by Agustín Ibáñez y Bojons.

Born in the parish of San Miguel de Peiteiros (Diocese of Tui, Pontevedra) in September 1771, he joined the Spanish Army. He served for several decades, reaching the rank of captain and later lieutenant colonel.

Ibáñez was appointed engineer in charge of the fortification of Montevideo in the Viceroyalty of the Río de la Plata by royal decree dated 29 March 1794, in response to Portuguese advances.

Map of South America by Agustín Ibáñez y Bojons, created in 1800. It shows borders similar to those in the 1775 map by Juan de la Cruz Cano y Olmedilla.

In 1800, Ibáñez created a map of South America that displays borders similar to those in the 1775 map by Juan de la Cruz Cano y Olmedilla, with the notable difference that the Atlantic boundary of the Kingdom of Chile is drawn closer to the 36th parallel south rather than the 38th. The description, reproduced in the 1942 volume *Monumenta Chartographica Indiana* by Julio Guillén Tato, prepared for the Ministry of Foreign Affairs (Spain), states that the map contains the "limits of the Viceroyalty of Buenos Aires," and the map itself includes the label "Fronteras de Buenos Ayres":

In the southeast, a circular cartouche includes an explanation, key, and notes. [...] as agreed for the better performance of land and sea reconnaissance carried out by the creator of the map in the year 1800 by order of the authorities. This is a copy. It contains the borders of the Viceroyalty of Buenos Aires, from which it likely originates, and includes a note regarding the boundaries of Spain and Portugal, such as: From the port of Maldonado to the Rio Grande de San Pedro was surveyed by the geographers of the boundary demarcation between the Crowns of Spain and Portugal, which began at the Arroyo de Chuy in the year 1780. It spans from the Equator to 57°S and from 23°30E to 24°30W from Buenos Aires. The same Royal Geographical Society of Madrid possessed another map which, although lacking the refined washes, was most likely the original; it was signed by Ibáñez and was identical in size and content. The Society also possessed the map by Millau of South America (17..), cited by Fernández Duro in *Disquisiciones Náuticas*, which largely served as a basis for the map by Cruz Cano described earlier.

The map was sent in 1802 to Secretary of State José de Urruña by Martínez de Cáceres, and in 1804, Ibáñez himself forwarded it to the Spanish Government along with a plan of operations to reclaim territories occupied by the Portuguese.

He died in May 1805 in Ceuta while on active military duty, at the age of 33.
