= Horatio (1800 ship) =

Ship

History

Great Britain
- Name: Horatio
- Builder: Liverpool
- Launched: 1800
- Fate: Wrecked 1817

General characteristics
- Tons burthen: 270, or 280, or 281, or 292 (bm)
- Complement: 1801:35; 1803:30; 1805:35; 1806:35; 1808:28; 1809:30
- Armament: 1801:16 × 9-pounder guns; 1803:16 × 9-pounder guns; 1805:16 × 9-pounder guns; 1806:16 × 9-pounder guns; 1808:16 × 9-pounder guns + 2 × 12-pounder carronades; 1809:16 × 9&12-pounder cannons

Horatio was launched in 1800 at Liverpool. She made four voyages as a slave ship in the triangular trade in enslaved people. During two of these voyages she was captured and recaptured. Shortly before the British slave trade ended she left the slave trade and sailed between Britain and South America and as a West Indiaman. She was wrecked in 1817.

== Career ==
Horatio first appeared in Lloyd's Register (LR) in 1800 with Bond, master, J.Bolton, owner, and trade London–Demerara.

=== 1st enslaving voyage (1801–1802) ===
Captain John Watson acquired a letter of marque on 11 September 1801. He sailed from Liverpool on 17 September, bound for the Gold Coast. Horatio purchased captives there and arrived at Kingston, Jamaica, on 19 May 1802, where she landed 272 captives. She sailed from Kingston on 28 June, and arrived back at Liverpool on 19 August. She had left Liverpool with 43 crew members and she suffered two crew deaths on the voyage.

=== 2nd enslaving voyage (1802–1803) ===
Captain Daniel Cox sailed from Liverpool on 13 October 1802 and started purchasing captives at Cape Coast Castle on 20 February 1803. Horatio arrived at St Vincent on 21 June 1803, where she landed 270 captives. She arrived back at Liverpool on 26 September. She had left with 25 crew members and had suffered one crew death on the voyage.

Captain Henry Bond acquired a letter of marque on 23 November 1803. She then traded between Liverpool and Barbados.

=== 3rd enslaving voyage (1804–1805) ===
Captain John Lawson sailed from Liverpool on 17 July 1804, apparently without having acquired a letter of marque. Horatio gathered captives at Lagos/Onim and then sailed for the West Indies. Lawson died on 19 November 1804. (Note: His previous command had been the slave ship Nelly.)

In December 1804 HMS Amsterdam recaptured Horatio, of Liverpool, Lawson, master, after a French privateer had captured her. Horatio was taken into Demerara, where she landed 114 captives. The report in the London Gazette gave Horatio's name as Lord Nelson. A report in Lloyd's List (LL) gave the vessel's name as Horatio, and also mentioned that the privateer had removed 160 of her people. A later report revealed that the privateer had taken out 160 of her captives, along with her crew, excepting the carpenter, boatswain, and one or two seamen.

Horatio arrived at Demerara on 9 January 1805, and landed 114 captives there. Captain Edward Crosby sailed Horatio from Demerara on 1 April and arrived back at Liverpool on 8 June. Horatio had left with 49 crew members and she suffered three crew deaths on the voyage.

=== 4th enslaving voyage (1805–1806) ===
Captain John Fotheringham acquired a letter of marque on 6 July 1805. He sailed from Liverpool on 23 July 1805, bound for Africa.

On 30 October HMS Narcissus recaptured "Horatio Nelson" and the French privateer Prudent, which had captured "Horatio Nelson". The action took place off Cape Mount (Liberia). In his letter, Captain Ross Donnelly of Narcissus described how he had come to capture the two vessels with the assistance of the enslaving ship Columbus. Donnelly had Columbus take "Horatio Nelson" to Cape Massarida where her late captain and part of her crew were. The privateer Prudent was armed with four 12 and eight 6-pounder guns, and had a crew of 70 men. A report in Lloyd's List (LL) stated that Narcissus had come into Saint Helena after having captured the French privateer Prudent (or Prudente) and recaptured the Guineaman (i.e., slave ship) Horatio, of Liverpool. Narcissus reportedly had sent Horatio on her voyage.

A later notice describes the English ship Horatio as being of 300 tons and armed with 22 guns. She was carrying rum, tobacco, slaves, and ivory. She was returned to Cape Mansarada where the French had landed her master. The salvage money notice for the recapture of Horatio reported that the share for a seaman was £1 3s 10d.

Horatio arrived at Trinidad on 28 February 1806 and there landed 274 captives. She left on 7 May and arrived at Liverpool on 7 July. At some point Thomas Nelson replaced Fotheringham as master. Horatio had left Liverpool with 43 crew members and suffered six crew deaths on the voyage.

=== Subsequent career ===
The Slave Trade Act 1807 ended the British slave trade, but even before its passage Horatio had ceased slave trading. Bolton, perhaps discouraged by having his vessel captured on each of her last two voyages, had sold her.

Captain Robert Burn acquired a letter of marque on 2 October 1806. At the time her owner was Backhouse, and her trade Liverpool–Buenos Aires.

Captain J. Cummins acquired a letter of marque on 8 August 1808. The Register of Shipping (RS) for 1809 still showed Burns as master, but now showed Harper & Co., as owner. Her trade was Liverpool–River Plate.

On 30 August 1809 Captain John Kneale acquired a letter of marque. (Note: In 1798–1799 Kneale had sailed Elizabeth on her first enslaving voyage.) However the 1810 volume of LR still showed Horatio's master as Burns. Her owner was Harper, and her trade was Liverpool–River Plate. The 1810 volume of LR gave her trade as London–Brazils.

On 24 October 1814, Horatio, Hannay, master, was driven ashore and damaged at Liverpool. She was on a voyage from Liverpool to Trinidad.

LR for 1816 showed Horatio with A. Hanny, master, Case & Co., owners, and trade London–Trinidad.

== Fate ==
Horatio, Hannay, master, was totally wrecked on 5 February 1817 in Dinas Dinlle, Caernarfonshire. Of the 26 people on board only two were saved. She had been sailing from Trinidad to Liverpool. It was not expected that any of the cargo would be saved.
