= Rebecca (1805 ship) =

History

United Kingdom
- Name: Rebecca
- Launched: 1802, Charleston
- Acquired: 1805
- Captured: 1805

General characteristics
- Tons burthen: 265, or 272 (bm)
- Complement: 34
- Armament: 16 × 4&6-pounder guns

Rebecca was launched at Charleston in 1802, possibly under another name. She first appeared in online British sources in 1805. In 1805, Rebecca began a voyage as a slave ship in the triangular trade in enslaved people but fell prey to Spanish privateers after she had embarked captives.

== Career ==
Rebecca first appeared in Lloyd's Register in 1805.

Year	Master	Owner	Trade	Source
1805	Thompson	M'Dowell	Liverpool–Africa	LR

Captain William Thompson sailed from Liverpool on 18 March 1805. He acquired captives at Loango and Cabinda.

== Fate ==
In December 1805, Lloyd's List reported that Rebecca, Thompson, master, William, Christie, master, and Clarendon, Grice, master, had been captured at Angola on 1 September. They were among the seven vessels off the Congo River that had fallen prey to a privateer. (Note: Among the other vessels were Active, Elizabeth, and Nelly.) The privateer was described as being of 22 guns and 350 men. Rebecca's captor sent her to the River Plate.

A second report named the captors as L'Orient, of 14 guns, and Dromedario, of 22 guns. The captured vessels arrived in the River Plate before 12 November.

Spanish records report that in June 1805, Viceroy Sobremonte, of Argentina, issued two letters of marque, one for Dolores (24 guns), Currand, master, and Berro y Errasquin, owner, and one for Dromedario (20 guns), Hippolito Mordel, master, and Canuerso y Masini, owner. The two sailed for the African coast, looking to capture enslaving ships. In three months of cruising Dolores captured three ships and one brig, carrying a total 600 enslaved people. Dromedario captured five ships, carrying a total of 500 enslaved people.

Rebecca's entry in the 1806 volume of the Register of Shipping (RS), carried the annotation "Captured".

In 1805, 30 British slave ships were lost. Thirteen were lost on the coast of Africa. During the period 1793 to 1807, war, rather than maritime hazards or slave resistance, was the greatest cause of vessel losses among British slave vessels.
