= Active (1781 ship) =

British merchant and slave ship 1781–1801

History

Great Britain
- Name: Active
- Launched: 1781, Chester
- Captured: 1 September 1805

General characteristics
- Tons burthen: 200, or 273, or 300 (bm)
- Complement: 1798: 20; 1801: 25; 1803: 33
- Armament: 1781: 6 × 9-pounder + 4 × 6-pounder guns; 1797: 6 × 4-pounder guns; 1798: 14 × 6-pounder guns; 1801: 12 × 12&9&6-pounder cannons; 1803: 12 × 9-pounder guns

Active was built in Chester in 1781. Initially, she traded with the Baltic and North America. From 1798 she made four complete voyages as a slave ship in the triangular trade in enslaved persons. A privateer captured her on 1 September 1805 during her fifth slave voyage, after she had embarked her slaves, and took her into the River Plate.

== Career ==
Active first appeared in the 1781 volume of Lloyd's Register (LR).

Year	Master	Owner	Trade	Source
1781	J.Powell	N.Ashton	Liverpool–Baltic	LR
1783	J.Powell	N.Ashton	London–Cork; Liverpool–Philadelphia	LR
1790	J.Powell; M.Hill; Hutchinson	N.Ashton	Liverpool–Virginia	LR
1791	Hutchinson	N.Ashton	Liverpool–London; Liverpool–Virginia	LR
1793	Hutchinson; R.Smith	N.Ashton	Liverpool–Virginia	LR
1794	Smith	N.Ashton	Liverpool–Wyborg	LR
1795	Smith	N.Ashton	Liverpool–Ostend	LR
1798	R.Smith; D.Hayward	Powell & Co.	Liverpool–Baltic; Liverpool–Africa	LR

1st slave voyage (1798–1799): Captain Daniel Hayward acquired a letter of marque on 25 June 1798. (Note: Hayward had been captain of Betsey when she was captured in 1798 on her first slave voyage.) He sailed Active from Liverpool on 15 August, bound for the Bight of Benin. She acquired her slaves at Calabar and at New Calabar. She arrived at St Vincent on 27 March 1799 with 426 slaves. (She apparently stopped at Demerara first.) She sailed from St Vincent on 4 May and arrived back at Liverpool on 28 June. She had left Liverpool with 43 crew members and she had suffered three crew deaths on her voyage.

2nd slave voyage (1799–1800): Captain Hayward sailed from Liverpool on 26 August 1799. Active gathered slaves at Calabar. Hayward died on 6 March 1800. Captain Samuel Welsby replaced Hayward. Active, arrived at Demerara on 1 July 1800 with 377 slaves. (Note: Lloyd's List reported that Haywood was still master when she arrived at Demerara, but that does not seem possible.) She sailed from Demerara on 29 July and arrived back at Liverpool on 13 September. She had left with 42 crew members and had suffered 15 crew deaths on her voyage.

Year	Master	Owner	Trade	Source & notes
1801	Haywood; M. Mills	G.Cafe & Co	Liverpool–Africa	LR; large repair 1802

3rd slave voyage (1801–1802): Captain Michael Mills acquired a letter of marque on 10 April 1801. He sailed from Liverpool on 21 May 1801. She was well at Cape Benda (Cabinda; Angola), on 28 November.

Active arrived at the Bahamas on 26 May 1802 with 277 slaves. She sailed for Liverpool on 12 June and arrived there on 18 July. She had left Liverpool with 47 crew members and had suffered eight crew deaths on her voyage.

4th slave voyage (1802–1804): Captain Mills sailed from Liverpool on 27 November 1802. He sailed during the Peace of Amiens. Active, Mills, master, was reported to have arrived at Angola. From there she sailed to Barbados, and on to Trinidad. Captain Mills acquired a letter of marque on 19 July 1803. She reportedly delivered her slaves to Tobago in August. She sailed for Liverpool on 3 December 1803. A strong gale stranded Active, Mills, master, from Tobago for the Clyde, on 24 January 1804 at Brodick Bay, on the Isle of Arran. It was expected that if the weather continued to moderate, a considerable part of her cargo could be saved, if not the vessel herself. another report stated that the Guineaman was a complete wreck and that only a few tons of elephant teeth, 47 puncheons of rum, and some wood would be saved.

5th slave voyage (1805–loss): Active was saved and repaired as Captain Mills sailed her from Liverpool on 7 February 1805. On 22 July she was at "Gaboon".

== Fate ==
Active was among the seven vessels off the Congo River that had fallen prey to a privateer in late 1805. (Note: The other vessels included Elizabeth, Nelly, Clarendon, Rebecca, and William.) The privateer was described as being of 22 guns and 350 men. Active's captor sent her to the River Plate. A second report named the captors as L'Orient, of 14 guns, and Dromedario, of 22 guns. The captured vessels arrived in the River Plate before 12 November.

Spanish records report that in June 1805, Viceroy Sobremonte, of Argentina, issued two letters of marque, one for Dolores (24 guns), Currand, master, and Berro y Errasquin, owner, and one for Dromedario (20 guns), Hippolito Mordel, master, and Canuerso y Masini, owner. The two sailed for the African coast, looking to capture enslaving ships. In three months of cruising Dolores captured three ships and one brig, carrying a total 600 enslaved people. Dromedario captured five ships, carrying a total of 500 enslaved people.

In 1805, 30 British slave ships were lost. Thirteen were lost on the coast of Africa. During the period 1793 to 1807, war, rather than maritime hazards or slave resistance, was the greatest cause of vessel losses among British slave vessels.
