= Nelly (1798 ship) =

British merchant and slave ship (1798–1805)

History

Great Britain
- Name: Elizabeth
- Launched: 1798, Liverpool
- Captured: 1805

General characteristics
- Tons burthen: 285, or 289, or 310 (bm)
- Complement: 1799: 20; 1800: 25; 1805: 40
- Armament: 1799: 10 × 9-pounder guns; 1800: 16 × 9-pounder guns; 1805: 22 × 9&18-pounder cannons

Nelly was launched at Liverpool in 1798. She initially sailed as a West Indiaman. From 1803 she made two complete voyages as a slave ship in the triangular trade in enslaved people. Spanish privateers captured her in 1805 while she was on her third voyage after she had embarked captives.

== Career ==
Nelly first appeared in Lloyd's Register in 1799. Captain Seacom Ellison acquired a letter of marque on 20 March 1799.

Year	Master	Owner	Trade	Source
1799	S.Ellison	Harper & Co	Liverpool–Martinique	LR
1800	S.Ellison; C.Lawson	Harper & Co	Liverpool–Martinique	LR

1st voyage transporting enslaved people (1800–1801): Captain Caesar Lawson acquired a letter of marque on 26 May 1800. He sailed on 24 June. In 1800, 133 vessels sailed from English ports, bound for the trade in enslaved people; 120 of these vessels sailed from Liverpool.

Lawson acquired captives at Bonny and arrived at Dominica on 24 November with 289. Nelly sailed from Dominica on 7 February 1801 and arrived back at Liverpool on 21 March. She had left Liverpool with 41 crew members and had suffered six crew deaths on her voyage.

2nd voyage transporting enslaved people (1802–1803): Captain John Lawson sailed from Liverpool on 14 January 1802. When he sailed the Peace of Amiens was about to take effect and so he did not acquire a letter of marque. In 1802, 155 vessels sailed from English ports, bound for the trade in enslaved people; 122 of these vessels sailed from Liverpool.

Lawson acquired captives at Badagry, stopped at São Tomé, and arrived at Demerara on 9 October with 283 captives. Nelly sailed from Demerara on 3 December and arrived back at Liverpool on 12 February 1802. She had left Liverpool with 30 crew members and had suffered six crew deaths on her voyage. (Note: Captain John Lawson next sailed Horatio on a slave voyage. He died on 19 November 1804.)

Year	Master	Owner	Trade	Source
1804	C.Dawson	Harper & Co.	Cork	LR
1805	C.Dawson; J.Seldon	Harper & Co. Hinde & Co.	Cork; Liverpool–Africa	LR

3rd voyage transporting enslaved people (1805–loss): Captain James Seldon acquired a letter of marque on 14 March 1805. He sailed on 28 April 1805. Seldon acquired slaves at Ambriz.

== Fate ==
In December 1805, Lloyd's List reported that Elizabeth, Hensley, master, and Nelly, Selden, master, had been captured at Angola. They were among the seven vessels off the Congo River that had fallen prey to a privateer. (Note: Among the other vessels were Active, Clarendon, Rebecca, and William.) The privateer was described as being of 22 guns and 350 men. Nelly's captor sent her to the River Plate.

A second report named the captors as L'Orient, of 14 guns, and Dromedario, of 22 guns. The captured vessels arrived in the River Plate before 12 November. Nelly arrived at Montevideo with 19 enslaved people; she had only embarked 20 before the Spanish captured her. She had left Liverpool with 50 crew members and arrived at Montevideo with 51, although she had suffered 10 crew member deaths on her voyage.

Spanish records report that in June 1805, Viceroy Sobremonte, of Argentina, issued two letters of marque, one for Dolores (24 guns), Currand, master, and Berro y Errasquin, owner, and one for Dromedario (20 guns), Hippolito Mordel, master, and Canuerso y Masini, owner. The two sailed for the African coast, looking to capture enslaving ships. In three months of cruising Dolores captured three ships and one brig, carrying a total 600 enslaved people. Dromedario captured five ships, carrying a total of 500 enslaved people.

In 1805, 30 British slave ships were lost. Thirteen were lost on the coast of Africa. During the period 1793 to 1807, war, rather than maritime hazards or slave resistance, was the greatest cause of vessel losses among British slave vessels.
