= William (1797 ship) =

British merchant and slave ship (1797–1805)

History

Great Britain
- Name: Rebecca
- Launched: 1788, Spain
- Acquired: 1797 by purchase of a prize
- Captured: 1805
- Notes: Fir plank

General characteristics
- Tons burthen: 162, or 173 (bm)
- Complement: 1798: 20; 1800: 20; 1804: 25; 1805: 30
- Armament: 1798: 2 × 6-pounder guns + 14 × 12-pounder carronades; 1798: 10 × 12-pounder cannons; 1800: 16 × 6&12-pounder cannons; 1804: 14 × 6&12-pounder cannons; 1805: 14 × 6&12-pounder cannons

William was launched in Spain in 1788, almost certainly under another name. She was taken in prize in 1797. William sailed as a West Indiaman until 1800 when new owners started to sail her as a slave ship in the triangular trade in enslaved people. She made four complete voyages as a slave ship. A report of her fourth voyage provides insight into the decision making over the planning of the voyage. Spanish privateers captured her in 1805 on her fifth slave voyage.

== Career ==
William first appeared in Lloyd's Register in 1797.

Year	Master	Owner	Trade	Source & notes
1797	Wallace	Litt & Co.	Liverpool–Jamaica	LR; repairs 1797
1798	Wallace; J.Bland	Litt & Co.	Liverpool–Jamaica	LR; repairs 1797

Captain Joseph Bland acquired a letter of marque on 9 November 1798.

Year	Master	Owner	Trade	Source & notes
1799	J.Bland	Middleton & Co.	Liverpool–Martinique	LR; repairs 1797
1800	J.Bland; Stowell	Middleton & Co.	Liverpool–Martinique	LR; repairs 1797
1801	T.Stowell	Bridges & Co.	Liverpool–Africa	LR; repairs 1797

1st voyage transporting enslaved people (1800–1801): Captain Francis Stowell acquired a letter of marque on 14 June 1800. He sailed from Liverpool on 23 July. In 1800, 133 vessels sailed from British ports on voyages to transport enslaved people; 120 of these vessels sailed from Liverpool.

William acquired captives at New Calabar. She arrived at Suriname on 26 December with 200 captives. She left Suriname on 19 February 1801 and arrived back at Liverpool on 20 April. She had left Liverpool with 27 crew members and suffered 10 crew deaths on her voyage.

2nd voyage transporting enslaved people (1801–1802): Captain Stowell sailed from Liverpool on 24 June 1801. In 1801, 147 vessels sailed from British ports on voyages to transport enslaved people; 122 of these vessels sailed from Liverpool.

William acquired captives at New Calabar and stopped at São Tomé on he way from Africa to the West Indies. William arrived at Suriname on 25 December. She sailed from Suriname on 24 April 1802 and arrived back at Liverpool on 11 June 1802. She had left Liverpool with 27 crew members and had suffered seven crew deaths on her voyage.

3rd voyage transporting enslaved people (1802–1803): Captain Joseph Haile left Liverpool on 8 September 1802, during the Peace of Amiens so he did not acquire a letter of marque. In 1802, 155 vessels sailed from British ports on voyages to transport enslaved people; 122 of these vessels sailed from Liverpool.

William arrived at Trinidad on 9 April 1803 with 198 captives. She arrived back at Liverpool on 24 August 1803. She had left Liverpool with 25 crew members and had suffered 12 crew deaths on her voyage.

Year	Master	Owner	Trade	Source
1804	J.Haill; J.Ainsworth	Bridge & Co. Leigh & Co.	Liverpool–Africa	LR; repairs 1797

In early I804, John Leigh and Captain John Ainsworth decided that New Calabar offered the possibility of a better than 100% profit to their partnership.

4th voyage transporting enslaved people (1804–1805): Captain John Ainsworth acquired a letter of marque on 5 June 1804. He sailed from Liverpool on 28 June, to acquire captives at Bonny and New Calabar. In 1804, 147 vessels sailed from British ports on voyages to transport enslaved people; 126 of these vessels sailed from Liverpool.

Leigh and Ainsworth's plan was that William would arrive in New Calabar after the July–August yam harvest. In addition to captives, Ainsworth could acquire yams to feed the captives during the Middle Passage. If she left the Bight of Biafra by October or November she would arrive in the West Indies in time to sell the captives during the beginning of the sugar harvest.

In late November 1804, William was off the Guianas when a French privateer attacked her. Although William was able to repel the attack, she was badly damaged.

William arrived at Suriname on 1 December with 196 slaves. There the factors forced Ainsworth "to sell his Slaves at best price." Because of the damage to William, Ainsworth could not sail to another market in the West Indies.

William sailed from Suriname on 29 January 1805 and arrived back at Liverpool on 27 March. She had left Liverpool with 31 crew members and had suffered six crew deaths on her voyage. On her return, Leigh stated that "altho this Vessel looked so very favorable at one time we fear not much profit will aris[e]."

5th enslaving voyage (1805–loss): Captain David Christie acquired a letter of marque on 5 June 1805. He sailed from Liverpool on 28 June. He started to acquire captives at Malembo.

== Fate ==
In December 1805, Lloyd's List reported that William, Christie, master, Rebecca, Mills, master, and Clarendon, Grice, master, had been captured at Angola on 1 September. They were among the seven vessels off the Congo River that had fallen prey to a privateer. (Note: Among the other vessels were Elizabeth, Nelly, and Active.) The privateer was described as being of 22 guns and 350 men. William's captor sent her to the River Plate.

A second report named the captors as L'Orient, of 14 guns, and Dromedario, of 22 guns. The captured vessels arrived in the River Plate before 12 November. William arrived at Montevideo with only two enslaved people.

Spanish records report that in June 1805, Viceroy Sobremonte, of Argentina, issued two letters of marque, one for Dolores (24 guns), Currand, master, and Berro y Errasquin, owner, and one for Dromedario (20 guns), Hippolito Mordel, master, and Canuerso y Masini, owner. The two sailed for the African coast, looking to capture enslaving ships. In three months of cruising Dolores captured three ships and one brig, carrying a total 600 enslaved people. Dromedario captured five ships, carrying a total of 500 enslaved people.

In 1805, 30 British enslaving ships were lost. Thirteen were lost on the coast of Africa. During the period 1793 to 1807, war, rather than maritime hazards or slave resistance, was the greatest cause of vessel losses among British slave vessels.
