= Clarendon (1804 ship) =

UK slave ship (1804–1805)

History

United Kingdom
- Name: Clarendon
- Launched: 1788, France
- Acquired: 1804 by purchase of a prize
- Captured: 1805

General characteristics
- Tons burthen: 412 (bm)
- Complement: 50
- Armament: 22 × 9&18-pounder cannons

Clarendon was launched in France in 1788, under another name. She was taken in prize in 1804. In 1805, Clarendon began a voyage as a slave ship in the triangular trade in enslaved people but fell prey to Spanish privateers after she had embarked captives.

== Career ==
Clarendon first appeared in Lloyd's Register in 1805.

Year	Master	Owner	Trade	Source
1805	J.Drew	W.Grice	Brocklebank	LR; large repair 1804

Captain William Grice acquired a letter of marque on 7 January 1805. He sailed from Liverpool on 23 January. He acquired captives at the Congo River and Cabinda.

== Fate ==
In December 1805, Lloyd's List reported that Clarendon, William, Mills, master, and Rebecca, Thompson, master, had been captured on 1 September at Angola. The two vessels were among the seven vessels off the Congo River that had fallen prey to a privateer. (Note: Among the other vessels were Elizabeth, Nelly, and Active.) The privateer was described as being of 22 guns and 350 men. Clarendon's captor sent her to the River Plate.

A second report named the captors as L'Orient, of 14 guns, and Dromedario, of 22 guns. The captured vessels arrived in the River Plate before 12 November. Clarendon arrived at Montevideo on 27 October 1805, with 232 slaves.

Spanish records report that in June 1805, Viceroy Sobremonte, of Argentina, issued two letters of marque, one for Dolores (24 guns), Currand, master, and Berro y Errasquin, owner, and one for Dromedario (20 guns), Hippolito Mordel, master, and Canuerso y Masini, owner. The two sailed for the African coast, looking to capture enslaving ships. In three months of cruising Dolores captured three ships and one brig, carrying a total 600 enslaved people. Dromedario captured five ships, carrying a total of 500 enslaved people.

In 1805, 30 British slave ships were lost. Thirteen were lost on the coast of Africa. During the period 1793 to 1807, war, rather than maritime hazards or slave resistance, was the greatest cause of vessel losses among British slave vessels.
