= Viceroyalty of the Río de la Plata =

South American territory of Spain (1776–1825)

Coordinates: 34.6667°S 58.4000°W

Viceroyalty of the Río de la Plata Virreinato del Río de la Plata
- 1776–1825
- Flag (Note: First national flag, naval and fortress flag, the last flag to float in the continental Americas.)
- Motto: Plus Ultra "Further Beyond"
- Anthem: Marcha Real "Royal March"
- Viceroyalty of the Río de la Plata around 1796. Light green represents its de jure extension.
- Status: Viceroyalty of the Kingdom of Spain and the Indies
- Capital: Buenos Aires (1776–1811); Córdoba (Note: Córdoba served as the provisional capital from 14 July to August 1806 during the British invasions.) (1806); Montevideo (Note: On 19 January 1811, Buenos Aires was declared a rebel city and Montevideo was chosen as its substitute.) (1811–1814)
- Common languages: Spanish (official); Indigenous languages
- Religion: Catholicism
- Government: Viceroyalty
- Monarch
  - 1776–1788: Charles III (first)
  - 1813–1825: Ferdinand VII (last)
- Viceroy
  - 1776-1777: P. de Cevallos (first)
  - 1811: J. de Elío (last)
- History
  - Organised: 1 August 1776
  - British invasions: 1806-1807
  - May Revolution: 25 May 1810
  - Cortes of Cádiz: 28 September 1810
  - Fall of Montevideo: 23 June 1814
  - Formally abolished: 1 April 1825

Population
  - 1801 census: 1,240,000
- Currency: Spanish real
Preceded by	Succeeded by
Viceroyalty of Peru	Provinces of the Río de la Plata; Intendency of Paraguay

The Viceroyalty of the Río de la Plata or Viceroyalty of the River Plate (Note: Spanish: virreinato del Río de la Plata) was the last to be organised and also the shortest-lived viceroyalty of the Spanish Empire in the Americas. It was established in 1776 from several former Viceroyalty of Peru dependencies that mainly extended over the Río de la Plata Basin, roughly the present-day territories of Argentina, northern Chile, Bolivia, Paraguay and Uruguay, extending inland from the Atlantic Coast. The colony of Spanish Guinea (present-day Equatorial Guinea) also depended administratively on the Viceroyalty of the Río de la Plata. Buenos Aires, located on the western shore of the Río de la Plata estuary flowing into the Atlantic Ocean, opposite the Portuguese outpost of Colonia del Sacramento, was chosen as the capital.

Usually considered one of the late Bourbon Reforms, the organisation of this viceroyalty was motivated on both commercial grounds (Buenos Aires was by then a major spot for illegal trade), as well as on security concerns brought about by the growing interest of competing foreign powers in the area. The Spanish Crown wanted to protect its territory against Great Britain and Portugal.

But these Enlightenment reforms proved counterproductive, or perhaps too late, to quell the colonies' demands. The entire history of this Viceroyalty was marked by growing domestic unrest and political instability. Between 1780 and 1782, the Rebellion of Túpac Amaru II inspired a violent Aymara-led revolt across the Upper Peru highlands, demonstrating the great resentment against colonial authorities by both the mestizo and indigenous populations. Twenty-five years later, the Criollos, native-born people of Spanish descent, successfully defended against two successive British attempts to seize control of Buenos Aires and Montevideo. This enhanced their sense of autonomy and power at a time when Spanish troops were unable to help.

In 1809, the Criollo elite revolted against colonial authorities in La Paz and Chuquisaca, establishing revolutionary governments or juntas. Although short-lived, retroversion of the sovereignty to the people provided a theoretical basis for the legitimacy of the locally based governments (temporarily in the absence of a legitimate king in Spain). These events proved decisive at the 1810 May Revolution events deposing Viceroy Cisneros at Buenos Aires.

The revolution in Buenos Aires spread across the other provinces of the Viceroyalty, against the resistance of Paraguay (which declared itself an independent nation in 1811) and the Upper Peru (which was annexed by the Viceroyalty of Peru). Meanwhile, the Governor of Montevideo Francisco Javier de Elío, appointed as a new Viceroy by the Spanish Government in 1811, declared the Buenos Aires Junta seditious. Nonetheless, after being defeated at Las Piedras, he retained control only of Colonia del Sacramento and Montevideo. He departed by ship to Spain on 18 November and resigned in January 1812. In 1814, the revolutionary patriots entered Montevideo, following a two-year-long siege. The Viceroyalty was disestablished in 1825 as Spanish political entity with the fall of Upper Peru and the death of the last Viceroy Pedro Antonio Olañeta.

== Nomenclature ==
The most common name in Spanish for this administrative division is virreinato del Río de la Plata (Viceroyalty of the Río de la Plata). Nevertheless, while it existed, the name virreinato de Buenos Aires (Viceroyalty of Buenos Aires) was also used, along with virreinato de las provincias del Río de la Plata (Viceroyalty of the Provinces of the Río de la Plata), virreinato de la Plata (Viceroyalty of la Plata), virreinato rioplatense and virreinato bonaerense. The Río de la Plata was the estuary of the most important port of the Viceroyalty, which was located in Buenos Aires, its capital. The word virreinato (viceroyalty) was not part of an official name, but a descriptive term for the administrative division; that is why, following the Royal Spanish Academy's indications, it is written in lowercase in the Spanish language.

On 28 February 1810, the Spanish were fighting against the French occupation of their country. Within that framework, the Junta of Cádiz (provisional Spanish government of Cádiz) issued a proclamation urging the Spanish territories in America to replace their viceroys and found their own juntas as well, while the king was imprisoned by Napoleon. This decision followed the liberal ideas of Cádiz, which pointed to limit the absolute power of the king afterwards. Therefore, as they did not want viceroys, they used the name Provincias del Río de la Plata (Provinces of the Río de la Plata) to refer to the South American provinces in the proclamation, since virreinato del Río de la Plata implied the existence of a viceroy. The name Provincias del Río de la Plata would be used by the successor state created during the May Revolution, but would later be replaced by Provincias Unidas del Río de la Plata.

Río de la Plata was usually translated as River Plate. This translation originated when plate could mean silver in English (“River of the Silver”). The name Argentina comes from argentum, which means silver in Latin.

== Reasons that led to the creation of the Viceroyalty ==
Around 1650, much of South America was part of the Viceroyalty of Peru, but this enormous territory made it difficult to administer, which was an important cause for dividing it. Besides, Portuguese settlement in Brazil had been expanding beyond the dividing line established by the Treaty of Tordesillas. In 1680, Portuguese governor of Rio de Janeiro had founded Cólonia do Sacramento on the coast of present-day Uruguay, right in front of Buenos Aires. All of this, along with the increasing commercial importance of Buenos Aires, and the frequent expeditions of France and Britain to Patagonia were reasons to have a separate administration in the region.

=== The Galleon Route ===
Since 1573, the Spanish commercial monopoly was carried out following the System of Fleets and Galleons, commonly referred to as Galleon Route, instructed by King Philip II. Every year, the New Spain and the Mainland fleets travelled from Sevilla to Veracruz and Portobelo respectively, and later came back to the Peninsula, serving as the commercial connection between the Spanish metropolis and the American territories. The Mainland fleet, for its part, transported goods from South America, including precious metals from Potosí, Upper Peru.

On 21 November 1739, Portobelo was attacked, sacked and destroyed by British forces, as part of the War of Jenkins' Ear. After that, the Spanish authorities decided to employ a different and more secure trade route, and considered the one used by smugglers to transport goods from Upper Peru to the Port of Buenos Aires as an option. Thus, since the Río de la Plata was the best alternative to the Galleon Route, it was necessary to improve its security.

In 1778, King Charles III of Spain promulgated the Royal Regulations and Tariffs for Free Trade from Spain to the Indies (Reglamento y Aranceles Reales para el Comercio Libre de España a Indias), which ended the monopolistic route and opened 13 ports in Spain and 25 in the Indies, including Buenos Aires and Montevideo, allowing them to trade with the metropolis. The Consulate of Commerce of Buenos Aires was authorised that year, but legal difficulties prevented it from being established until 1794. This modificication was not free trade —since only Peninsular ships were able to use the legalised ports— but a predecessor to what would develop. Later, in 1795, commerce with non-Spanish colonies was legalised too, and ships registered in the Indies were allowed to use Spanish ports. In the decade of 1778–1788, the commerce between Spain and Spanish America increased by nearly 700%. All these changes occurred within the framework of the Bourbon Reforms.

== History ==
Audiencias of the Viceroyalty of Peru in 1680. Most of the future Viceroyalty of the Río de la Plata territory was part of the Royal Audiencia of Charcas, although Cuyo was in Chile.

=== Project and creation of the Viceroyalty ===
On 8 October 1773, King Charles III asked the Royal Audiencia of Lima and the governor of Buenos Aires about the possibility of creating an audiencia in Tucumán. The audiencias were supreme courts of justice that exercised some administrative functions over their territory, in collaboration with the viceroys. A single Viceroyalty could have many audiencias. Both Tucumán and Buenos Aires were part of the Royal Audiencia of Charcas (along with much of the present-day Argentine land), within the Viceroyalty of Peru.

On 22 January 1775, Viceroy Manuel de Amat y Junient answered the request with a different proposal: to create an audiencia in Buenos Aires and a new viceroyalty, which included the Río de la Plata territories (such as Buenos Aires and Montevideo), and had its capital in Chile. On 1 April 1776, the German-born Portuguese general commander of São José do Norte, Johann Heinrich Bohm, attacked the Santa Bárbara and Trinidad forts, and recovered the village of Río Grande, which had been previously conquered by the Spanish governor of Buenos Aires Pedro de Cevallos. This event made the king think about creating a viceroyalty with its capital on the Río de la Plata instead of Chile.

In 1776, a military expedition to South America was being organised. The objective, according to King Charles III, was to recover the lost territory and punish Portugal. On 27 July 1776, Pedro de Cevallos, who at that time was governor of Madrid, received a letter naming him commander of the campaign. Besides, on 1 August 1776 the king gave him control over the Royal Audiencia of Charcas and the corrigimiento of Cuyo, as viceroy and general captain in order to facilitate the mission. When the expedition was finished, Cevallos had to resume its office as governor on Madrid and let the command of Charcas and Cuyo as it was before his arrival. Although theoretically temporary, this separate administration of these territories, with Pedro de Cevallos as viceroy, was the beginning of the new viceroyalty.

=== Pedro de Cevallos' military expedition ===
Cevallos started its campaign with the objective of pushing Portugal to the east of the dividing line previously established by the Treaty of Tordesillas. On 20 February 1777, the expedition —that consisted of 116 ships— disembarked on Santa Catalina Island, which surrendered on 5 March. Later, since they were not able to attack Río Grande due to weather conditions, the expedition headed to the south of the Banda Oriental (present-day Uruguay). On 4 June, the Portuguese governor of Colonia del Sacramento surrendered to Cevallos, and the city was destroyed. The campaign continued and captured the Fortress of Santa Teresa and the Fort of San Miguel, advancing towards the population of Río Grande. Nevertheless, the offensive stopped when Cevallos was notified about peace negotiations between Spain and Portugal.

On 1 October 1777, the Treaty of San Ildefonso was signed by the two colonial powers. Portugal recognised Spanish sovereignty over Colonia del Sacramento and San Gabriel Island. In exchange, Spain had to give up the Santa Catalina Island and Río Grande. Besides, Portugal gave Spain the Fernando Poo and Annobón Islands (nowadays part of Equatorial Guinea).

=== Formal establishment ===
Once the conflict with Portugal had ended, Cevallos arrived at Buenos Aires on 15 October 1777. He dictated the Auto de libre internación, allowing free trade of both products from Spain and the Indies, between Buenos Aires, Chile and Peru. Besides, since Potosí —land of the precious metals— was under his jurisdiction, on 8 July 1777 he had prohibited the delivery of unminted gold and silver to the Iberian Peninsula if it was not done through the Port of Buenos Aires. These measures affected the merchants from Lima, but were allowed by those from Cádiz.

On 27 October 1777, the king formalised the creation of the viceroyalty, ending its temporary nature. The reason behind this, in his own words, was that Lima was too far away from Buenos Aires; therefore having a separate viceroyalty was more efficient. The territory remained, but the viceroy was replaced shortly after. On 28 June 1778, Cevallos returned to Spain and handed over command to the new viceroy, Juan José de Vértiz y Salcedo, as he was expected to do when the campaign was finished. He died on 28 December of that year.

=== Portuguese capture of the Misiones Orientales ===
From 1801 to 1802, within the framework of the War of the Oranges, the Misiones Orientales, which were part of the Political and Military Government of the Misiones Guaraníes, were captured by Portuguese forces and discontented Guaraní people. On 1 August 1801, the alliance occupied San Miguel Arcángel, and a few days later conquered the rest of the Misiones Orientales and the town of San Francisco de Borja. Other Portuguese forces took over the military posts between the Piratini and Jaguarão rivers: Batoví, the Fort of Santa Tecla and the Guardia of San Martín. In January 1802, they destroyed the Fort of San José, situated at the south border of the Apa River in Paraguay. The King of Portugal accepted to return the conquered territories to Spain, but never did so. This loss, along with the loss of Paraguay in 1810, resulted in the narrow extension of present-day Argentina in its northeastern corner, which belongs to the Misiones Province.

=== British invasions ===
In 1806, during the Napoleonic Wars, the French Emperor Napoleon Bonaparte established the Continental System, a large-scale embargo against Britain. As Spain was allied with France, it obeyed the imposition and illegalised trade with the British. Although it kept occurring through smuggling, it was more difficult. On the other hand, Britain was aiming to expand its influence and achieve new markets. The Río de la Plata was a good objective: it had a very important port, it wasn't protected by a professional army and it had a valuable treasure that couldn't be delivered to Spain due to the naval blockade established after the Battle of Trafalgar. Besides, capturing it would later allow Britain to move forward to Potosí and take its precious metals.

In June 1806, a military expedition planned by Home Riggs Popham and commanded by William Carr Beresford captured Buenos Aires and established a provisional government, which decreed free trade with Britain. The Viceroy Rafael de Sobremonte had gone to Córdoba with the treasure and proclaimed that city as the provisional capital on 14 July 1806. On the other hand, in Montevideo, the French-born Spanish military man Santiago de Liniers, who had been sent there by the viceroy, was organising an army to defeat the invasion. This army consisted of a cavalry unit commanded by Juan Martín de Pueyrredón and composed of people from Buenos Aires and nearby towns. Besides, there were hundreds of volunteers. This army recovered Buenos Aires 46 days after it was captured; Beresford surrendered and was arrested. This event is known as La Reconquista (The Reconquest).

William Beresford surrendering to Santiago de Liniers during the British Invasions to the Río de la Plata.

A few days after La Reconquista, the Cabildo replaced Rafael de Sobremonte with Santiago de Liniers as viceroy, marking the first time a viceroy was selected by local authorities instead of the king. Between 1806 and 1807, Liniers organised urban militias in order to protect the Viceroyalty. Each militia was linked to a social class and a weapon. That was the beginning of important militias such as the Regiment of Patricians, which would have an important role in the May Revolution. On the other hand, the British never left the Río de la Plata, and kept up a blockade while waiting for reinforcements, which would arrive a year after the First Invasion.

On 28 June 1807, the Second Invasion began under John Whitelocke's command. This time, the British captured Montevideo first and defeated Liniers in the Battle of Cordón. In Buenos Aires, Martín de Álzaga organised a resistance with urban militias and unarmed civilians. The British entered the city willing to capture the Fort (the government building), but were rejected by the people. The neighbors threw boiling water and other objects at the British soldiers. Finally, Whitelocke surrendered on 7 July. This event is known as La Defensa (The Defence).

The British invasions have many different interpretations according to each historiographical current. First, they are usually divided into the First and the Second Invasion, but some historians talk about a single invasion since the British never left the Río de la Plata. Besides, it is widely considered that the successful defence of the Viceroyalty is the “seed of the freedom” of the people in the Río de la Plata, because it proved that they were capable of defending themselves without Peninsular reinforcements. However, according to other historians, the ideas of the Enlightenment and the inspiration of the French Revolution were already circulating in some groups by the time of the invasion. The British also left very important marriages that would later become destinguished families of the Argentine society, such as the Bell, Newton, Tomkinson, Wilde, Lynch, Lumb, Green, Smith, Milber, O'Connor, Cranwell, Stegman, Shaw, Writh, Lawson, etc.

=== Politics during Liniers' government ===
On 13 February 1808, the appointment of Liniers as viceroy, made by the Cabildo a year earlier, was ratified by the King. Nevertheless, his government started to have huge problems a few months later, when the French invasion of Spain took place. Napoleon captured Charles IV and his son, Ferdinand VII, and appointed his brother Joseph Bonaparte as king of Spain. Many politicians and people started to distrust Liniers due to his French origins. Besides, he made political mistakes that increased the doubts about his loyalty.

In August 1808, the Marquis of Sassenay arrived in the Viceroyalty of the Río de la Plata, willing to convince the local government to swear loyalty to Napoleon's brother as new king of Spain. Liniers rejected him in public, but met him in private a day later. As a direct consequence, many people started to suspect that the Viceroy might be negotiating an agreement. After the private meeting, Liniers proclaimed neutrality in the Peninsular War, which implied refusing to recognise both the authority of the King Joseph I and the provisional government juntas, as well as temporarily governing the Viceroyalty as an autonomous entity under his command, in the name of Ferdinand VII. This was seen as treason by the governor of Montevideo, Javier de Elío, who rejected Liniers' authority and founded a provisional government junta in his province on 20 September 1808, after an open cabildo.

On the other hand, Carlota Joaquina (sister of Ferdinand VII and spouse of the future King of Portugal) sent from Brazil a document called Justa Reclamación (Fair Claim), in which she claimed having the right to govern the Spanish territories in America while her brother was kidnapped. That document started a political movement called Carlotism (carlotismo in Spanish), composed of politicians such as Mariano Moreno and Manuel Belgrano, who were looking for a greater participation of criollo people in the Viceroyalty government. The Justa Reclamación was rejected by Liniers and the Cabildo of Buenos Aires, and the project ended up failing due to lack of support.

On 1 January 1809, the Peninsular merchant, Martín de Álzaga —who had organised La Defensa during the Second British Invasion— attempted to overthrow Liniers by demanding his resignation. He was supported by the Cabildo —which he presided over—, and many Peninsular urban militias, which were positioned all over the central square (Plaza de la Victoria, nowadays known as Plaza de Mayo). Liniers was about to sign his resignation and authorise the creation of a junta, but then Cornelio Saavedra appeared with his Regiment of Patricians and many civilians who supported Liniers, in order to prove that a majority of the population did so. After this, the attempted coup ended.

Later in 1809, the Junta of Sevilla (provisional Spanish government due to the absence of King Ferdinand VII) appointed Baltasar Hidalgo de Cisneros as the new viceroy of the Río de la Plata, with the purpose of reconstructing the central government of the Viceroyalty. He arrived in Montevideo first; De Elío recognised his authority and dissolved his junta. Then Cisneros went to Buenos Aires, where Liniers gave him command peacefully. He indulted Martín de Álzaga and other persons involved in the attempted coup.

=== Revolutions in Chuquisaca and La Paz ===
The capture of the Spanish kings —Charles IV and Ferdinand VII— by Napoleon created a power vacuum that needed to be solved. In the Iberian Peninsula, the Spanish people refused to recognise the authority of Napoleon's brother as king and started to form government juntas in the name of Ferdinand VII. The most important one was the Supreme Central Junta, better known as the Junta of Sevilla, which was later dissolved after the Battle of Ocaña, but replaced by the Council of Regency of Spain and the Indies in 1810. Many political views lived together in the juntas, from liberals who were looking forward to democratising Spain, to conservatives who wanted to preserve the regime as it was before the French invasion. On the other hand, Napoleon didn't conquer Spanish America, but the authorities of those territories, such as the viceroys and the presidents of the audiencias, had lost their superior —the King—, as well as their source of legitimacy. Because of this, many Spanish Americans wanted to imitate the Peninsular example and create their own government juntas.

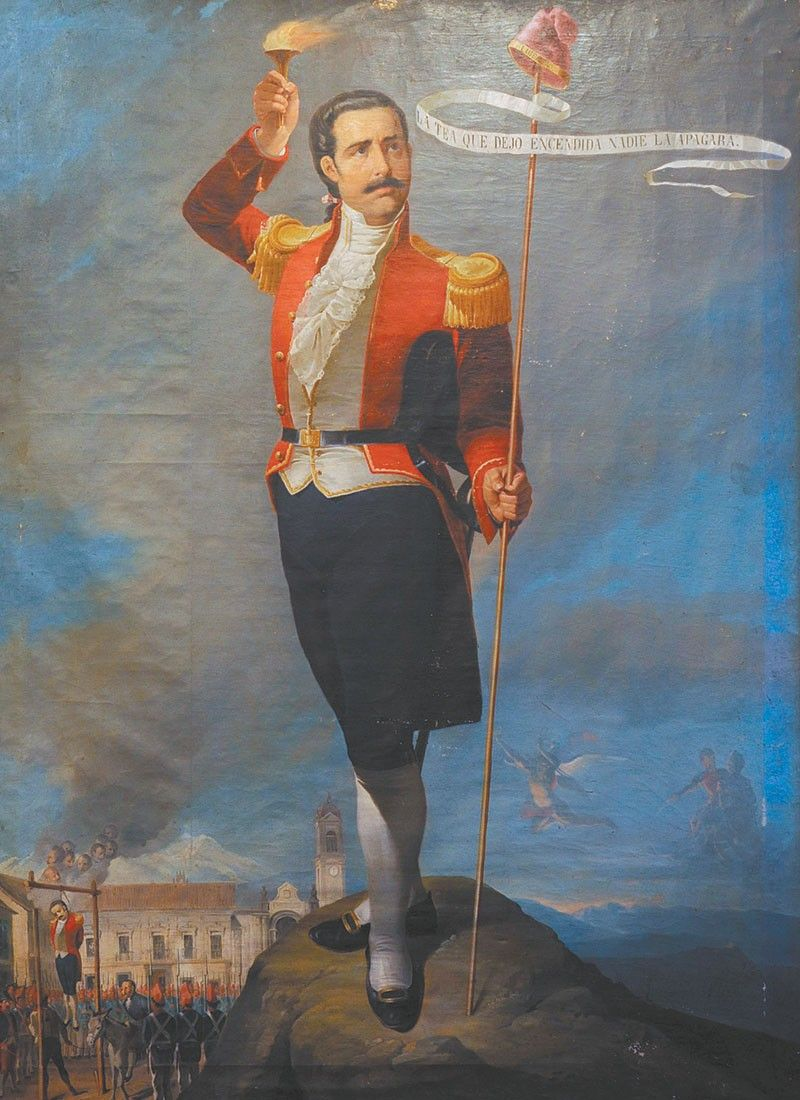
Picture of Pedro Domingo Murillo, main leader of the La Paz Revolution.

On 25 May 1809, a Revolution broke out in Chuquisaca, Upper Peru (present-day Bolivia), which was under the Viceroyalty of the Río de la Plata's jurisdiction. The oidores (judges) of the Royal Audiencia of Charcas dismissed the president of the audiencia and constituted the body as a government junta, called Audiencia Gobernadora (Governing Audiencia). The reason behind this movement was to prevent the recognition of either Carlota de Joaquina or Joseph Bonaparte as legitimate authorities, as proposed by Carlotism and the Marquis of Sassenay respectively. Nevertheless, there were politicians who were looking for a full independence of Upper Peru as well. In July 1809, the city of La Paz (present-day administrative centre of Bolivia) followed Chuquisaca and created its own junta, called Junta Tuitiva (Guardianship Board), but with a better marked goal for independence, as seen in its proclamation. The main figure of the Junta Tuitiva was Pedro Domingo Murillo.

Although both La Paz and Chuquisaca were encompassed by the Viceroyalty of the Río de la Plata, the Viceroy Liniers didn't respond since its term was about to finish and his successor had already been appointed. Within that framework, the Viceroy of Peru, José Fernando de Abascal y Sousa, acted quickly and sent José Manuel de Goyeneche to suppress the Junta Tuitiva of La Paz, which was closer to the limits of Peru than Chuquisaca. The revolution was defeated and its main leaders, such as Murillo, were executed in January 1810. For his part, the new Viceroy of the Río de la Plata, Baltasar Hidalgo de Cisneros, appointed Vicente Nieto as the new president of the Royal Audiencia of Charcas and launched an army under his command, composed by urban militias of Buenos Aires such as the patricians and the arribeños. When this army arrived in Chuquisaca, the revolutionaries had already liberated the previous president of the audiencia and dissolved the Audiencia Gobernadora, after seeing the disastrous ending of the La Paz revolution.

=== May Revolution ===
On 18 May 1810, the news about the dissolution of the Junta of Sevilla and its replacement by the Council of Regency arrived in Buenos Aires. This information made the legitimacy of the Viceroyalty government even more controversial. Not only was it not clear who the Viceroy should respond to in the absence of Ferdinand VII, but also whether the Viceroy was a legitimate authority or not, because the institution which had appointed him was not an official one created by the King, but by the Peninsular people, and no longer existed. Public opinion was divided between those who supported the continuity of Viceroy Cisneros, and those who wanted his replacement by a different government (the revolutionaries). This latter group was composed of many politicians from the Carlotism movement; since they wanted greater participation of the criollo people in the government, as well as a modernisation of Spanish rule, they considered the situation as a great opportunity to found an American government junta similar to the Peninsular ones. They sustained their position in a political concept called retroversion of sovereignty to the people, which states that, in the absence of the legitimate leader (the King), the sovereignty returns to the people, who should manage the government until their recognised sovereign is back. The revolutionaries considered that, despite there was only one Spanish nation, it was composed of different peoples, so each one should govern itself and none should dominate the others in absence of the King. Those who supported the Viceroy, for their part, argued that, while there was a European Spanish in The Americas, he should command the government.

In order to discuss the situation and achieve the replacement of the government, the revolutionaries needed an Open Cabildo to take place. The Cabildo was the governing body of the municipality composed of 12 members. However, during political crisis, it was usual to convene an Open Cabildo, which was integrated by important neighbors of the city. In this case, due to the crisis of legitimacy of Viceroy Cisneros, an Open Cabildo was capable of dismissing him. Therefore, on 21 May 1810, Domingo French and Antonio Luis Beruti, along with more than 600 people, occupied the Plaza de la Victoria —which would later be renamed as Plaza de Mayo, after these events— until the Viceroy accepted to convene one. The Open Cabildo took place on 22 May 1810 and voted 156 to 69 in favor of dismissing Cisneros. Finally, on 25 May 1810, the Provisional Governing Junta of the Provinces of the Río de la Plata in the name of His Lord Don Ferdinand VII, commonly known as the Junta of Buenos Aires and historiographically as the Primera Junta (First Board) was created, with the leader of the Regiment of Patricians, Cornelio Saavedra, as chairman; Juan José Castelli, Manuel Belgrano, Miguel de Azcuénaga, Manuel Alberti, Domingo Matheu and Juan Larrea as members, and Juan José Paso and Mariano Moreno as secretaries. The Primera Junta swore loyalty to Ferdinand VII but refused to recognise the authority of the provisional government of the Iberian Peninsula (the Council of Regency) because it was not created by the King, was very conservative compared to the previous government (the Junta of Sevilla), and according to the retroversion of sovereignty, it should only govern the Peninsular people, since it was composed by them, having no authority over the rest of the Spanish Nation.

The intentions behind the revolutionaries and the purpose of the May Revolution are widely debated among historians. The classic historiographical current, headed by the 6th President of Argentina, Bartolomé Mitre, states that some of the revolutionaries wanted independence from the very beginning, but they had to hide their intentions until the international situation was favorable. This strategy, called the Mask of Ferdinand VII, implied swearing loyalty to him. Other historians say that independence was not the goal at first; instead, the revolutionaries, influenced by liberal ideas, would have wanted to modernise and democratise the Spanish government, just as the liberals of the Peninsular juntas. When the provisional Spanish governments and later the restored reign of Ferdinand VII turned conservative, independence ended up being the only option. The Spanish administrative divisions that confronted the United Provinces during the Argentine War of Independence were both conservative and anti-independence, so those conflicts are explained by the two main interpretations of the Revolution.

=== Downfall ===
The May Revolution marked the beginning of the United Provinces of the Río de la Plata and ended the viceregnal system in Buenos Aires at first. One of the first measures of the new Junta was to announce its foundation to other cities and ask them to send representatives. Nonetheless, not every province of the Viceroyalty came under the authority of the new state. The intendancies of Upper Peru (Chuquisaca, La Paz, Potosí, Cochabamba), along with its political-military governments (Moxos and Chiquitos) were annexed by the Viceroyalty of Peru as an emergency measure to stop the spread of the revolution; the same happened with the Intendancies of Salta del Tucumán and Córdoba del Tucumán, although they would be recovered by the United Provinces later, in contrast to Upper Peru, which ended up being a different country (Bolivia). The Intendancy of Paraguay, for its part, swore loyalty to the Council of Regency and refused to recognise the authority of the Junta of Buenos Aires, defeating it during the Paraguay campaign. However, the Guaraní nation declared independence and signed a peace treaty with the Provinces of the Río de la plata a year later.

The territory of the Banda Oriental (present-day Uruguay) that depended directly on the Intendancy of Buenos Aires received the circular sent by the Junta very quickly. Nevertheless, the Political and Military Government of Montevideo, headed by Francisco Javier de Elío (the same who distrusted Liniers' loyalty to Spain and rejected his authority), rejected the authority of the Primera Junta. Meanwhile, just as Buenos Aires did not recognise the legitimacy of the Council of Regency, this institution did not recognise the authority of the Junta of Buenos Aires. That is why the Regency appointed Gaspar de Vigodet as governor of Montevideo promoted Elío to Viceroy of the Río de la Plata in August-September 1810. Vigodet's government achieved important victories against the Junta, such as the Battle of San Nicolás, taking over the majority of the Banda Oriental and securing the naval superiority of Montevideo and its control over the rivers. Elio, for his part, arrived in Montevideo later and demanded the Junta to recognise his authority as Viceroy. He was rejected, so he declared Buenos Aires a rebel city and proclaimed Montevideo as the new capital of the Viceroyalty. Thus, the Viceroyalty of the Río de la Plata continued to exist in Montevideo and other cities that were temporarily controlled by that government for a few more years.

Elío exercised his power in Montevideo, but he was not widely accepted as Viceroy in the countryside of the Banda Oriental. On 28 February 1811, the Cry of Asencio took place; Commander Pedro José Viera, along with some gauchos and ranchers, started a rebellion against Elío's regime, which was supported by the Provinces of the Río de la Plata. When the Paraguay campaign was finished, the Junta of Buenos Aires ordered Belgrano to march towards the Banda Oriental. He contacted José Gervasio Artigas, who had deserted from an army under Elío's command and put himself at the service of the Junta, and was leading the popular uprising against Montevideo authorities. Under his command, important victories were achieved, such as the Battle of Las Piedras, which left the Viceroy with only Montevideo and Colonia del Sacramento. Both territories were besieged by the Provinces of the Río de la Plata, and Colonia del Sacramento was abandoned by the authorities of Elío.

As a last resort, the Viceroy asked the Portuguese of Brazil to attack the Banda Oriental. This sudden invasion, along with the defeat in the Battle of Huaqui, made the Provinces of the Río de la Plata —at that time, led by the First Triumvirate, which had replaced the Junta— sign a treaty with Montevideo on 21 October 1811. This agreement, called Tratado de Pacificación (Treaty of Pacification) ended the siege, accepted the authority of Viceroy Elío over the Banda Oriental and reaffirmed the recognition of Ferdinand VII as king by both parties. This treaty was not well received by the Council of Regency, which ordered Elío to return to the Peninsula and replaced him with Gaspar de Vigodet, with the rank of General Captain of the Río de la Plata, turning the Viceroyalty of the Río de la Plata into something similar to a general captaincy. The agreement did not last long, as Artigas refused to accept it and the United Provinces did nothing to stop him.

On 20 October 1812, the United Provinces reestablished the siege of Montevideo. Within that framework, the urban militias of the city started to attack and sack the coasts of the Uruguay and Paraná Rivers to obtain food supplies, but this stopped after the victory of the United Provinces against them in the Battle of San Lorenzo, under José de San Martín's command. Even so, by 1813 Montevideo had not fallen, so the government of Buenos Aires changed its strategy. Between 1813 and 1814, a small fleet was created with the mission of disputing the Montevidean control of the rivers; the Irishman Guillermo Brown was selected as commander. On 15 March 1814, the fleet defeated Captain Jacinto Romarate in the Naval Battle of Martín García, and occupied the strategic island. After this, on 20 April 1814, Brown established a naval blockade against Montevideo, and defeated its navy again in the Battle of Buceo; this ended the naval superiority of Montevideo. On 17 May 1814, Vigodet negotiated the surrender. Finally, on 23 May 1814, Carlos María de Alvear, who was in charge of the ground troops, took over the city, marking the de facto ending of the Viceroyalty of the Río de la Plata.

=== Formal abolition ===
After 1814, the Viceroyalty of the Río de la Plata existed only on paper. On 27 May 1825, after learning about the defeat of the Spanish army in the Battle of Ayacucho, Ferdinand VII designated Pedro Antonio Olañeta, a very loyal royalist commander, as viceroy of the Río de la Plata. This appointment was primarily symbolic, since the Viceroyalty had been liberated more than a decade earlier. However, Olañeta had died on 1 April 1825 during the Battle of Tumusla, but the news had not yet reached Spain. Logically, he could not exercise his office.

In the second half of the 19th century, Spain recognised the independence of the new countries that were part of the Viceroyalty on the following dates:

- Argentina (United Provinces): 27 June 1860
- Bolivia (Upper Peru): 12 February 1861
- Paraguay: 8 April 1882
- Uruguay (Banda Oriental and Montevideo): 9 October 1882.

== Economy and society ==
=== Activities ===
The main pillar of the economy of the Viceroyalty of the Río de la Plata was the extraction of silver from Upper Peru (especially from Cerro Rico) and its transport across the Camino Real (Royal Road) towards the Port of Buenos Aires, for subsequent export to the metropolis. This was, in fact, one of the reasons that led to the creation of the Viceroyalty, along with security issues in the territory. This regular movement stimulated different economic activities across the Viceroyalty. For example, the transport of silver required wagons, as well as animals capable of pulling them, such as horses, donkeys and mules. These necessities led to the development of an artisanal wagons industry in San Miguel de Tucumán and Mendoza, and to the breeding of the mentioned animals in San Miguel de Tucumán too.

The majority of the population of the Viceroyalty lived in Upper Peru. However, this region did not have significant agricultural and livestock productions, so the food needed to come from other provinces. The Pampas supplied Upper Peru with low-cost meat, and also Portuguese Brazil through smuggling. The free livestock that formally belonged to the king was usually consumed by the population; the gauchos played an important role in transporting these animals to Upper Peru. Mendoza and Paraguay had very important plantations of yerba mate that supplied the entire Viceroyalty and even the Captaincy General of Chile. There were other crops like grapes for wine in Salta, Tarija, Cuyo and Córdoba; and olive plantations in La Rioja and Catamarca. However, the olive groves were felled to prevent competition with the Peninsular monopoly.

Upper Peru could not supply its population with wool either, so it became a client that stimulated the cotton plantations in Santiago del Estero and the establishment of an incipient textile industry, in which cotton and llama, goat and sheep wools were processed in the present-day provinces of Santiago del Estero, Catamarca, Salta and La Rioja. Furthermore, Tucumán developed a saddlery industry. On the other hand, Córdoba gained a significant importance for being the crossroads of the routes that connected the west with the east and the north with the southeast of the Viceroyalty. The territory north of Córdoba was called El Arriba (The Up), while the region south of it received the name of El Abajo (The Down). Finally, the agriculture that fed the dispersed populations was a subsistence agriculture, mainly horticulture.

=== Transport ===
In the Pampas —a plains region—, the speed of transportation was about 8 to 10 leagues per day on horseback. The most intense races, which were carried out with chasquis and horses that were replaced in each post house, could reach 800 kilometres in 10 days, again in the Pampas. With that intense system, often called revientacaballos (horse-killing), the distance between the cities of Mendoza and Buenos Aires (about 1,100 kilometres) could be covered in 22 days. The official mail system of the territory, which would later become part of the Viceroyalty, started in 1748, and was reorganised with post houses in 1771. In 1767, the Correo Ultramarino La Coruña-Montevideo (Overseas Mail La Coruña-Montvideo) was created; in 1786, the encomienda mail between Potosí and Buenos Aires was established. At that time, the speed of cargo transportation was very slow: a wagon pulled by 4 oxen could take 3 months to travel 1,000 kilometres.

The river navigation was relatively fast when going down the river: from Asunción to Buenos Aires, it took approximately 15 days. However, going up the Paraná River against the current allowed a speed of transportation of only 3 miles per hour, therefore returning from Buenos Aires to Asunción could take 3 months (frequently around 112 days). Because of this, in 1739 the Royal Audiencia of Charcas ordered that every ship from Paraguay should disembark in Santa Fe and continue its journey by land. This situation was formalised by the royal decree of 1 April 1743, but later reverted by Viceroy Pedro Melo de Portugal due to conflicts that had arisen from the decision.

=== Capitalism or feudalism ===
Another subject of debate among historians is the main mode of production that could be seen in the Viceroyalty of the Río de la Plata. Sergio Bagú states that, since in most cases America exported its production to the great European markets, the economic system cannot be described with any other term than capitalism. This stance is supported by other historians such as Milcíades Peña and the European André Gunder Frank. In contrast, other essayists such as Rodolfo Puiggrós claim that the mode of production is not determined by the final destiny of what it produces, but by the production relations that predominate in the country; and these production relations, in the Viceroyalty of the Río de la Plata, had feudal characteristics (encomienda, mita, yanaconazgo).

A detailed study on the Viceroyalty of the Río de la Plata in the late 18th century displays a variety of modes of production living together. A natural economy, with no significant relation to the market (gauchos on the littoral that appropriated animals to eat them and exchanged the leather for tobacco, yerba mate and rum), mainly domestic and primitive industries (family looms), self-consumption crops, industries with emergent markets (wagons and furniture from Tucumán and shipbuilding from Corrientes), craft activities in different cities (saddlery, smithing, silversmithing) and feudal systems of work, such as the mita and the encomienda, usually related to precious metals.

=== Demography and social classes ===
In the early 19th century, around a million people were living in the Viceroyalty of the Río de la Plata, around 90% of them from Córdoba to the north and the littoral, where, likewise, the greatest economic activity took place. Nonetheless, Buenos Aires was a very important city, with around 100,000 people and its port. The society of the Viceroyalty had very differentiated estates:

- A bureaucratic class related to the Viceroy (judges, functionaries, important ecclesiastical authorities)
- A merchant aristocracy which benefited from the Spanish commercial monopoly
- A new merchant bourgeoisie composed of British people and criollos, many of whom were smugglers
- A livestock bourgeoisie
- A social sector composed of market gardeners and farmers
- A lower bourgeoisie composed of lawyers, doctors, students and employees
- Laborers, slaves and indigenous people.

==== Enslaved people ====
In the second half of the 18th century, black people represented around 25 or 30% of the urban population. In 1774, in the city of Buenos Aires, there were 1,150 blacks, 33 mulattoes and 221 pardos, constituting as a whole almost 17% of the city's population. In 1778, the percentage reached 28.38%. Likewise, 37% of urban families had African slaves dedicated to housework, and 12% of families had between 10 and 20 slaves for all uses. The situation was similar in the rest of the provinces; for example, in Tucumán, 64% of the population was of African origin.

Black people had been brought since the very beginning of the Spanish administration of America, so their commerce was widespread and had special markets in towns like Retiro. Important families of the Viceroyalty at that time, like the Martinez de Hoz, the Álzaga, the Basavilbaso and Count Liniers (Santiago de Liniers’ brother), were in the infamous business of buying and selling slaves. Black people were grouped in different communities depending on the African region they came from: the "congos" (from the Congo and Cameroon), the "cafres" (from Mozambique and Madagascar), the "mandingas" (from Guinea), and the "benguelas" (from Angola). African slaves are a very common image of the "Época colonial" (colonial time), with the characters of the black woman who sells "pastelitos" (an Argentine dessert) and the black male slave being very frequent figures in Argentine school events. This is sometimes criticized for the danger of romanticizing slavery.

The decline of the Afro-descendant population in Argentina (0.7% nowadays according to the last census) is widely studied among historians. The most common factors listed are the Paraguayan War, which involved many black people in the army; the yellow fever epidemic and the arrival of European immigrants between the 19th and the 20th century, which changed Argentina's demography completely.

== Administrative divisions ==
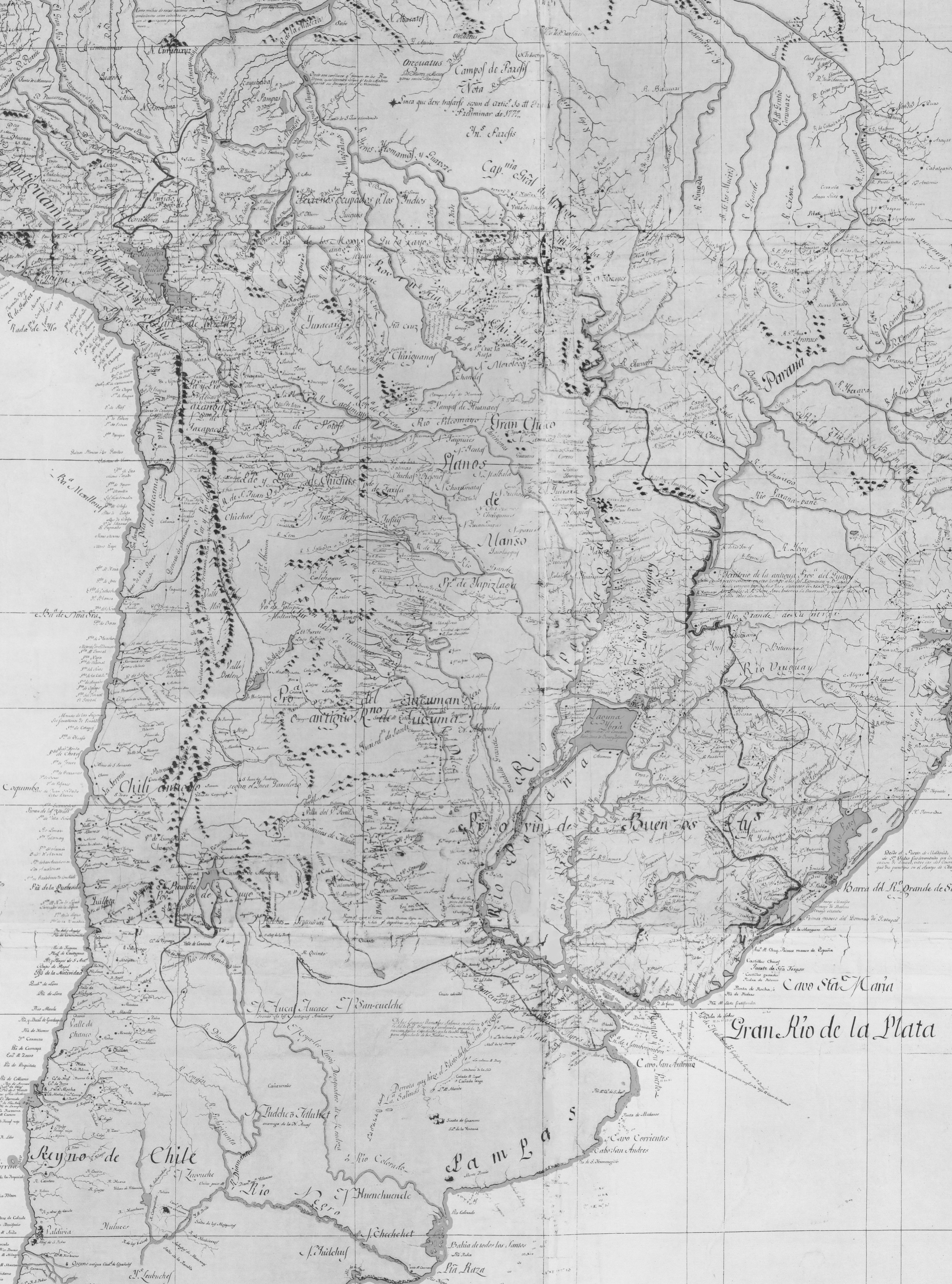
Map of the Viceroyalty of the Río de la Plata by Agustín Ibáñez y Bojons from 1800.

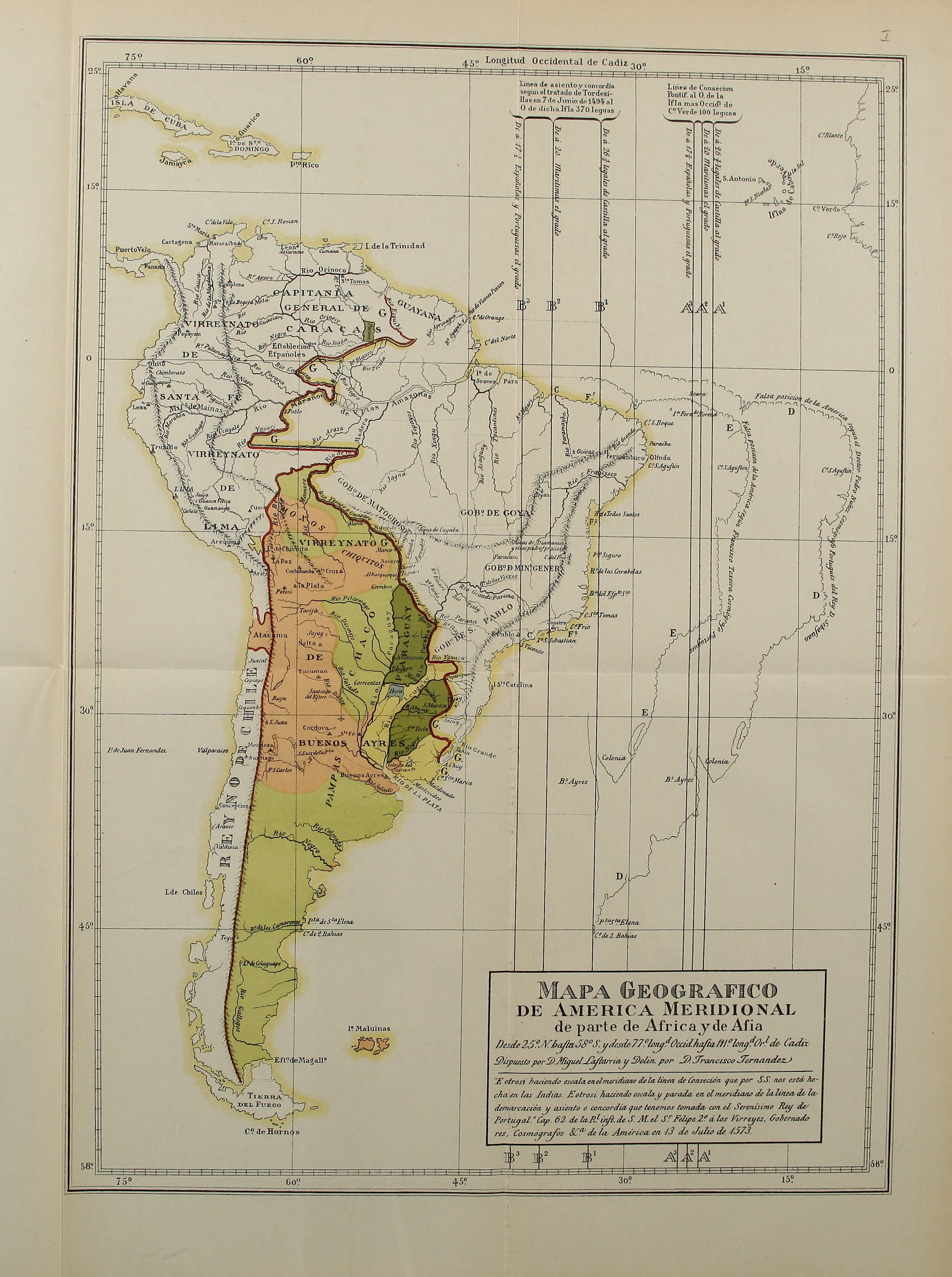
Map of the Viceroyalty of the Río de la Plata by Miguel de Lastarria from 1804.

During the colonial period, conflicting works about the southern border of the viceroyalty were made, one map depicts East Patagonia depending from the Captaincy General of Chile and the other from La Plata.

The Spanish Empire in America maintained two types of administrative divisions simultaneously: the audiencias and the viceroyalties (there were also captaincies general, as an alternative to viceroyalties for territories which requeried a more military-focused administration). While the audiencias were supreme courts of justice, behaving as the judicial power, the viceroyalties were the actual governments capable of managing the economy, the military and other executive affairs. Since they were different entities, the territory of an audiencia could consist of specific parts of different viceroyalties. In the same way, a single viceroyalty could be covered by more than one audiencia.

When the Viceroyalty of the Río de la Plata was created, it included the territories of the Viceroyalty of Peru that were encompassed by the Royal Audiencia of Charcas, as well as the corregimiento of Cuyo, which was covered by the Royal Audiencia of Chile. The territories of Charcas consisted of 5 governorates, 2 Spanish corregimientos and 21 indigenous corregimientos. New divisions were created later, such as the Governorate of Fernando Pó y Annobón and the Indigenous Corregimiento of Chulumani.

=== Administrative divisions from 1776 to 1784 ===
From 1776 to 1784, the viceroyalty was divided into governorates and corregimientos. The governorates encompassed bigger territories, while the corregimientos had smaller ones. Besides, sometimes the governorates included political-military governments; this administrative division existed in frontier territories like Montevideo, which borders Brazil.

- Royal Audiencia of Charcas
  - Governorates
    - Governorate of the Río de la Plata (1776-1783)
      - Political and Military Government of Montevideo (1776-1814)
      - Political and Military Government of the Misiones Guaraníes (1776-1810)
      - Political and Military Command of the Islas Malvinas (1776-1811)
    - Governorate of Paraguay
    - Governorate of Tucumán (1776-1784)
    - Governorate of Santa Cruz de la Sierra (1776-1784)
      - Political and Military Government of Moxos (1776-1810)
      - Political and Military Government of Chiquitos (1776-1810)
    - Governorate of Chucuito (1776-1784)
    - Governorate of Fernando Pó and Annobón (1777-1778)
    - Governorate of Santa Catalina (1777-1778)
  - Super-Intendancies
    - Super-Intendancy of the Patagonian Establishments (1778-1785)
  - Corregimientos
    - Spanish corregimientos
      - Corregimiento of La Paz (1776-1784)
      - Corregimiento of Oruro (1776-1784)
    - Indigenous corregimientos
      - See full list... (1776-1784)
- Royal Audiencia of Chile
  - Corregimientos
    - Spanish corregimientos
      - Corregimiento of Cuyo

=== Administrative divisions from 1784 ===
The corregidores (leaders of the corregimientos) were very unpopular, since the majority of them was related to corruption scandals. This was due to a failure in the system of corregimientos: The charge of corregidor was sold at a very high price, which was even higher than the salary. Thus, in order to recover the money they paid, the corregidores used to extract resources from the local economy. Within that framework, in 1782 King Charles III signed the Real Ordenanza de Intendentes de Ejército y Provincia (Royal Ordinance of Army and Provincial Intendants) and reorganised the administrative divisions of the viceroyalty. The governorates were replaced by eight intendancies (Buenos Aires, San Miguel de Tucumán, Cuyo, Paraguay, Santa Cruz de la Sierra, La Paz and Chuquisaca), which also received the name of provinces. The corregimientos were suppressed, as well as the political-military governments (with the exception of the Political and Military Governments of Montevideo and the Misiones Guaraníes).

Nonetheless, before the royal ordinance took effect, the king made some modifications in 1783. He ordered to keep the Political and Military Governments of Moxos and Chiquitos, along with the other two Political-Military Governments he ordered to preserve before, therefore cancelling the elimination of the Political-Military Governments. On the other hand, the king ordered to cancel the creation of the Intendancy of San Miguel de Tucumán, in order to create the Intendancies of Salta del Tucumán and Córdoba del Tucumán instead. Besides, he ordered to create the Intendancy of Cochabamba instead of the Intendancy of Cuyo. The reorganisation was completed around 1784, resulting in the following list:

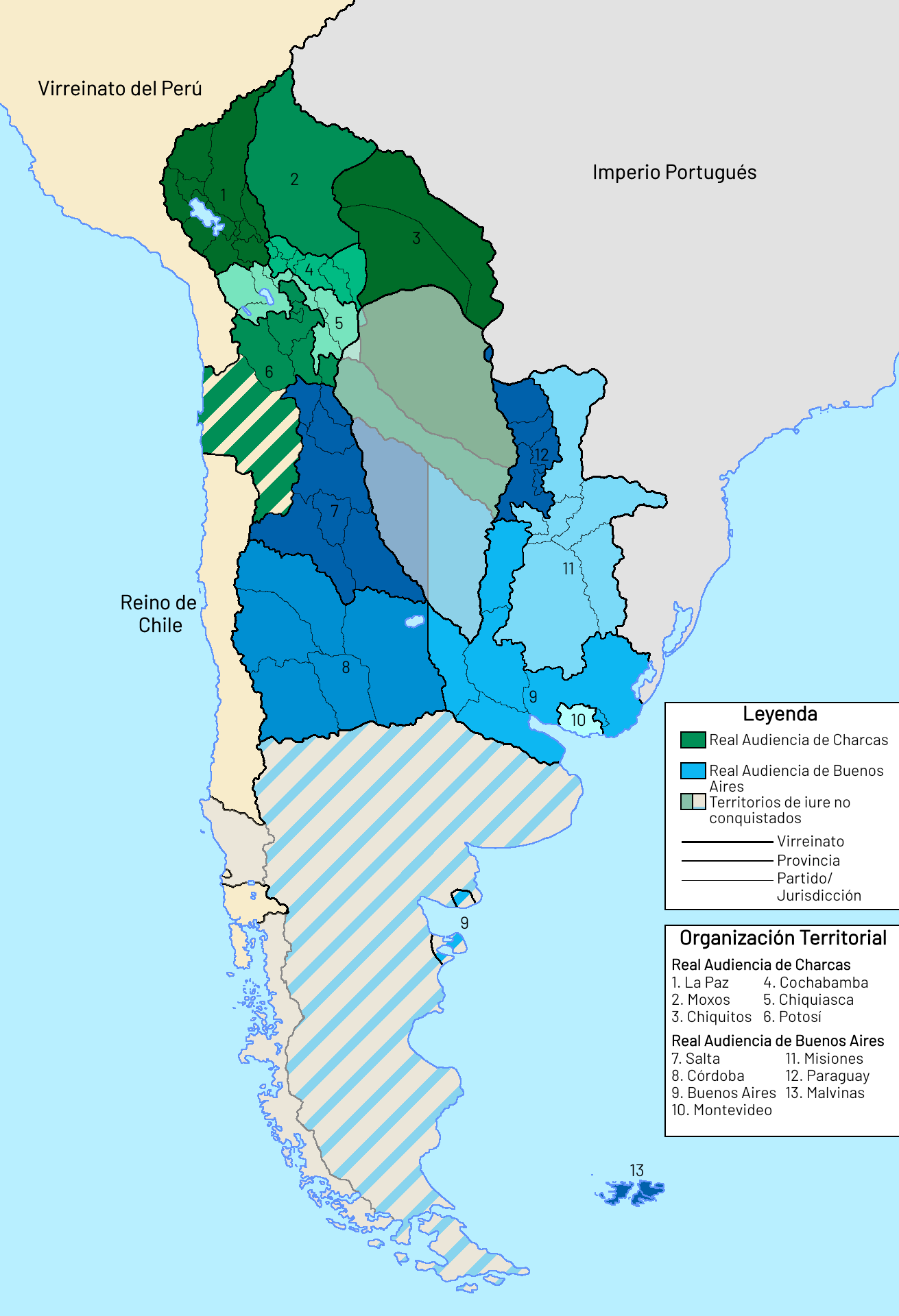
Viceroyalty of the Río de La Plata administrative divisions in 1783

- Royal Audiencia of Charcas
  - Intendancies
    - Intendancy of Chuquisaca (1782-1810)
    - Intendancy of La Paz (1782-1810)
    - Intendancy of Potosí (1782-1810)
    - Intendancy of Cochabamba (1785-1810)
    - Intendancy of Puno (1784-1796)
  - Political-Military Governments
    - Political and Military Government of Moxos (1776-1810)
    - Political and Military Government of Chiquitos (1776-1810)
- Royal Audiencia of Buenos Aires
  - Intendancies
    - Intendancy of Buenos Aires (1785-1810)
      - Political and Military Government of Montevideo (1776-1814)
    - Intendancy of Paraguay (1785-1810)
    - Intendancy of Salta del Tucumán (1785-1810)
    - Intendancy of Córdoba del Tucumán (1785-1810)
  - Political-Military Governments
    - Political and Military Government of the Misiones Guaraníes (1785-1810)

The Intendancy of Puno became part of the Viceroyalty of Peru in 1796. The Intendancies of Chuquisaca, La Paz, Potosí and Cochabamba, as well as the Political and Military Governments of Moxos and Chiquitos, stopped being part of the Viceroyalty of the Río de la Plata in 1810, since they were annexed by the Viceroyalty of Peru when Buenos Aires decided not to recognise the authority of the Council of Regency of Spain and proclaimed its own government. On the other hand, the Intendancies of Buenos Aires, Salta del Tucumán and Córdoba del Tucumán, along with the Political and Military Government of the Misiones Guaraníes, swore loyalty to the new Buenos Aires government (the Primera Junta), and became part of the Provinces of the Río de la Plata. The Intendency of Paraguay rejected Buenos Aires' authority, and began governing itself autonomously. By 1811, the Political and Military Government of Montevideo was the only remaining administrative division of the Viceroyalty of the Río de la Plata, and was captured by the United Provinces in 1814, marking the de facto end of the viceroyalty.

=== List of cities of the Viceroyalty ===
- Intendancy of Chuquisaca: City of La Plata de la Nueva Toledo, also referred to as Charcas (present-day Sucre).
- Intendency of La Paz: City of La Paz.
- Intendency of Potosí: Cities of Potosí and Oruro.
- Intendency of Cochabamba: Cities of Cochabamba and Santa Cruz de la Sierra.
- Political and Military Government of Moxos: City of San Pedro de Mojos.
- Political and Military Government of Chiquitos: City of Chiquitos.
- Intendancy of Buenos Aires: Cities of Buenos Aires, Corrientes, Santa Fe, Colonia and Carmen de Patagones.
- Political and Military Government of Montevideo: City of Montevideo.
- Intendency of Paraguay: City of Asunción.
- Intendency of Salta: Cities of Catamarca, Santiago del Estero, Tucumán, Salta and Jujuy.
- Intendency of Córdoba del Tucumán: Xities of Rio Cuarto, Córdoba, La Rioja, San Juan, Mendoza and San Luis.
- Political and Military Government of the Misiones Guaraníes: Cities of San Ignacio, Yapeyú and Candelaria.

== Government ==
The Viceroyalty of the Río de la Plata was created in 1776 by Charles III of Spain. Although it functioned as a Spanish colony, Río de la Plata was technically a personal possession of the King of Spain. This allowed both European Spain and its overseas territories to have their own laws and regulations.

=== List of viceroys ===
The King of Spain appointed viceroys to govern the Spanish viceroyalties in his name. In the beginning their terms had no fixed duration and could last for life. Later he established fixed terms of three to five years. Because of the distances between Spain and South America, and with sailing as the chief means of transport, there were long delays between the designation of a viceroy and the viceroy's effectively taking power. In addition, regular communication between the Crown and the viceroyalty was equally delayed. The viceroyalties had to operate with considerable independence and self-reliance.

#	Picture	Name	From	Until	Designation	Notes	Secretary of the Indies	First Secretary of State	Monarch
1		Pedro Antonio de Cevallos	15 October 1777	26 June 1778	1 August 1776	Appointed by Charles III of Spain	Marquess of Sonora (Note: As Secretary of State for Indies)	Count of Floridablanca	Charles III
2		Juan José de Vértiz y Salcedo	26 June 1778	7 March 1784	27 October 1777	Appointed by Charles III of Spain; resigned	Marquess of Sonora	Count of Floridablanca	Charles III
3		Nicolás del Campo	7 March 1784	4 December 1789	13 August 1783	Appointed by Charles III of Spain	Marquess of Sonora	Count of Floridablanca	Charles III
3		Nicolás del Campo	7 March 1784	4 December 1789	13 August 1783	Appointed by Charles III of Spain	Count of Floridablanca (Interim)	Count of Floridablanca	Charles III
3		Nicolás del Campo	7 March 1784	4 December 1789	13 August 1783	Appointed by Charles III of Spain	Antonio Porlier (Note: As Secretary of State for Grace and Justice of Indies) Antonio Valdés y Fernández Bazán (Note: As Secretary of State for War, Treasury, Commerce and Navigation of Indies)	Count of Floridablanca	Charles III
4		Nicolás Antonio de Arredondo	4 December 1789	16 March 1795	21 March 1789	Appointed by Charles IV of Spain, resigned	Antonio Porlier Antonio Valdés y Fernández Bazán	Count of Floridablanca	Charles III
4		Nicolás Antonio de Arredondo	4 December 1789	16 March 1795	21 March 1789	Appointed by Charles IV of Spain, resigned	Antonio Porlier Antonio Valdés y Fernández Bazán	Count of Floridablanca	Charles IV
4		Nicolás Antonio de Arredondo	4 December 1789	16 March 1795	21 March 1789	Appointed by Charles IV of Spain, resigned	No secretary (affairs of Indies distributed among different secretariats)	Count of Aranda (Interim)	Charles IV
4		Nicolás Antonio de Arredondo	4 December 1789	16 March 1795	21 March 1789	Appointed by Charles IV of Spain, resigned	No secretary (affairs of Indies distributed among different secretariats)	Manuel Godoy	Charles IV
5		Pedro Melo de Portugal	16 March 1795	15 April 1797	5 February 1794	Appointed by Charles IV of Spain, died in office	No secretary (affairs of Indies distributed among different secretariats)	Manuel Godoy	Charles IV
-		Royal Audiencia of Buenos Aires	15 April 1797	2 May 1797		Interim government until the arrival of a new viceroy	No secretary (affairs of Indies distributed among different secretariats)	Manuel Godoy	Charles IV
6		Antonio Olaguer Feliú	2 May 1797	14 March 1799	2 May 1797	During his mandate, he had to contend with the presence of British and Portuguese forces in the Río de la Plata region, as well as nascent revolutionary sentiment inspired by the recent French Revolution. He opened the port of Buenos Aires to foreign traffic in a bid to stimulate the commercial activities of the Viceroyalty.	No secretary (affairs of Indies distributed among different secretariats)	Manuel Godoy	Charles IV
6		Antonio Olaguer Feliú	2 May 1797	14 March 1799	2 May 1797	During his mandate, he had to contend with the presence of British and Portuguese forces in the Río de la Plata region, as well as nascent revolutionary sentiment inspired by the recent French Revolution. He opened the port of Buenos Aires to foreign traffic in a bid to stimulate the commercial activities of the Viceroyalty.	No secretary (affairs of Indies distributed among different secretariats)	Francisco Saavedra	Charles IV
6		Antonio Olaguer Feliú	2 May 1797	14 March 1799	2 May 1797	During his mandate, he had to contend with the presence of British and Portuguese forces in the Río de la Plata region, as well as nascent revolutionary sentiment inspired by the recent French Revolution. He opened the port of Buenos Aires to foreign traffic in a bid to stimulate the commercial activities of the Viceroyalty.	No secretary (affairs of Indies distributed among different secretariats)	Mariano Luis de Urquijo	Charles IV
7		Gabriel de Avilés, 2nd Marquis of Avilés	14 March 1799	20 May 1801	25 October 1797		No secretary (affairs of Indies distributed among different secretariats)	Mariano Luis de Urquijo	Charles IV
7		Gabriel de Avilés, 2nd Marquis of Avilés	14 March 1799	20 May 1801	25 October 1797		No secretary (affairs of Indies distributed among different secretariats)	Pedro Cevallos Guerra	Charles IV
8		Joaquín del Pino y Rozas	20 May 1801	11 April 1804	14 July 1800	Appointed by Charles IV of Spain, died in office	No secretary (affairs of Indies distributed among different secretariats)	Pedro Cevallos Guerra	Charles IV
9		Rafael de Sobremonte	24 April 1804	10 February 1807	10 November 1804	During the British invasions of the Río de la Plata Buenos Aires and Montevideo fell under British authority for brief periods of time. Sobremonte was forced on 14 August 1806 by an open cabildo to move to Montevideo, delegating in Santiago de Liniers the military authority and in the Audience the other areas of government. He was removed completely as viceroy by a martial court, with Liniers elected as interim viceroy.	No secretary (affairs of Indies distributed among different secretariats)	Pedro Cevallos Guerra	Charles IV
		Santiago de Liniers	10 February 1807	30 June 1809	24 December 1807	Interim viceroy, confirmed in office by Charles IV of Spain, replaced by the Junta of Seville.	No secretary (affairs of Indies distributed among different secretariats)	Pedro Cevallos Guerra	Charles IV
		Santiago de Liniers	10 February 1807	30 June 1809	24 December 1807	Interim viceroy, confirmed in office by Charles IV of Spain, replaced by the Junta of Seville.	No secretary (affairs of Indies distributed among different secretariats)	Gonzalo O'Farril	Charles IV
		Santiago de Liniers	10 February 1807	30 June 1809	24 December 1807	Interim viceroy, confirmed in office by Charles IV of Spain, replaced by the Junta of Seville.	No secretary (affairs of Indies distributed among different secretariats)	Pedro Cevallos Guerra	Ferdinand VII
		Santiago de Liniers	10 February 1807	30 June 1809	24 December 1807	Interim viceroy, confirmed in office by Charles IV of Spain, replaced by the Junta of Seville.	No secretary (affairs of Indies distributed among different secretariats)	Martín Garay Perales (Interim)	Ferdinand VII
11		Baltasar Hidalgo de Cisneros	15 July 1809	25 May 1810	11 February 1809	Appointed by the Junta of Seville, ousted from office by the May Revolution, replaced by the Primera Junta.	No secretary (affairs of Indies distributed among different secretariats)	Martín Garay Perales (Interim)	Ferdinand VII
11		Baltasar Hidalgo de Cisneros	15 July 1809	25 May 1810	11 February 1809	Appointed by the Junta of Seville, ousted from office by the May Revolution, replaced by the Primera Junta.	No secretary (affairs of Indies distributed among different secretariats)	Eusebio Bardají y Azara	Ferdinand VII
11		Baltasar Hidalgo de Cisneros	15 July 1809	25 May 1810	11 February 1809	Appointed by the Junta of Seville, ousted from office by the May Revolution, replaced by the Primera Junta.	No secretary (affairs of Indies distributed among different secretariats)	Pedro Rivero (Interim)	Ferdinand VII
11		Baltasar Hidalgo de Cisneros	15 July 1809	25 May 1810	11 February 1809	Appointed by the Junta of Seville, ousted from office by the May Revolution, replaced by the Primera Junta.	No secretary (affairs of Indies distributed among different secretariats)	Francisco Saavedra	Ferdinand VII
11		Baltasar Hidalgo de Cisneros	15 July 1809	25 May 1810	11 February 1809	Appointed by the Junta of Seville, ousted from office by the May Revolution, replaced by the Primera Junta.	No secretary (affairs of Indies distributed among different secretariats)	Nicolás Ambrosio Garro y Arizcun (Interim)	Ferdinand VII
12		Francisco Javier de Elío	12 January 1811	18 November 1811	31 August 1810	Governor of Montevideo, self-proclaimed "viceroy", political chief confirmed as such by the Cortes of Cádiz, which also declared Montevideo the new capital of the viceroyalty and Buenos Aires a rebel city.	No secretary (affairs of Indies distributed among different secretariats)	Nicolás Ambrosio Garro y Arizcun (Interim)	Ferdinand VII
-		Gaspar de Vigodet	18 November 1811	23 June 1814	26 July 1811	Appointed by the Council of Regency as the highest authority in the Río de la Plata with the positions of Captain General and Governor of the Provinces of the Río de la Plata and President of the Royal Audience of Buenos Aires, although without the title of “viceroy”. He resisted a 20-month siege in Montevideo until, finally, the city fell into the hands of the government of Buenos Aires. Vigodet was then arrested and taken to Rio de Janeiro.	No secretary (affairs of Indies distributed among different secretariats)	Nicolás Ambrosio Garro y Arizcun (Interim)	Ferdinand VII
-		Gaspar de Vigodet	18 November 1811	23 June 1814	26 July 1811	Appointed by the Council of Regency as the highest authority in the Río de la Plata with the positions of Captain General and Governor of the Provinces of the Río de la Plata and President of the Royal Audience of Buenos Aires, although without the title of “viceroy”. He resisted a 20-month siege in Montevideo until, finally, the city fell into the hands of the government of Buenos Aires. Vigodet was then arrested and taken to Rio de Janeiro.	No secretary (affairs of Indies distributed among different secretariats)	José García de León y Pizarro (Interim)	Ferdinand VII
-		Gaspar de Vigodet	18 November 1811	23 June 1814	26 July 1811	Appointed by the Council of Regency as the highest authority in the Río de la Plata with the positions of Captain General and Governor of the Provinces of the Río de la Plata and President of the Royal Audience of Buenos Aires, although without the title of “viceroy”. He resisted a 20-month siege in Montevideo until, finally, the city fell into the hands of the government of Buenos Aires. Vigodet was then arrested and taken to Rio de Janeiro.	No secretary (affairs of Indies distributed among different secretariats)	Ignacio de la Pezuela (Interim)	Ferdinand VII
-		Gaspar de Vigodet	18 November 1811	23 June 1814	26 July 1811	Appointed by the Council of Regency as the highest authority in the Río de la Plata with the positions of Captain General and Governor of the Provinces of the Río de la Plata and President of the Royal Audience of Buenos Aires, although without the title of “viceroy”. He resisted a 20-month siege in Montevideo until, finally, the city fell into the hands of the government of Buenos Aires. Vigodet was then arrested and taken to Rio de Janeiro.	Ciriaco González Carvajal (Interim) (Note: As Secretary of State for Overseas Governance)	Carlos Martínez de Irujo	Ferdinand VII
-		Gaspar de Vigodet	18 November 1811	23 June 1814	26 July 1811	Appointed by the Council of Regency as the highest authority in the Río de la Plata with the positions of Captain General and Governor of the Provinces of the Río de la Plata and President of the Royal Audience of Buenos Aires, although without the title of “viceroy”. He resisted a 20-month siege in Montevideo until, finally, the city fell into the hands of the government of Buenos Aires. Vigodet was then arrested and taken to Rio de Janeiro.	Ciriaco González Carvajal (Interim)	Pedro Gómez Labrador	Ferdinand VII
-		Gaspar de Vigodet	18 November 1811	23 June 1814	26 July 1811	Appointed by the Council of Regency as the highest authority in the Río de la Plata with the positions of Captain General and Governor of the Provinces of the Río de la Plata and President of the Royal Audience of Buenos Aires, although without the title of “viceroy”. He resisted a 20-month siege in Montevideo until, finally, the city fell into the hands of the government of Buenos Aires. Vigodet was then arrested and taken to Rio de Janeiro.	José Limonta (Interim)	Pedro Gómez Labrador	Ferdinand VII
-		Gaspar de Vigodet	18 November 1811	23 June 1814	26 July 1811	Appointed by the Council of Regency as the highest authority in the Río de la Plata with the positions of Captain General and Governor of the Provinces of the Río de la Plata and President of the Royal Audience of Buenos Aires, although without the title of “viceroy”. He resisted a 20-month siege in Montevideo until, finally, the city fell into the hands of the government of Buenos Aires. Vigodet was then arrested and taken to Rio de Janeiro.	José Limonta (Interim)	Antonio Cano Ramírez de Arellano (Interim)	Ferdinand VII
-		Gaspar de Vigodet	18 November 1811	23 June 1814	26 July 1811	Appointed by the Council of Regency as the highest authority in the Río de la Plata with the positions of Captain General and Governor of the Provinces of the Río de la Plata and President of the Royal Audience of Buenos Aires, although without the title of “viceroy”. He resisted a 20-month siege in Montevideo until, finally, the city fell into the hands of the government of Buenos Aires. Vigodet was then arrested and taken to Rio de Janeiro.	Manuel Antonio de la Bodega y Mollinedo	Antonio Cano Ramírez de Arellano (Interim)	Ferdinand VII
-		Gaspar de Vigodet	18 November 1811	23 June 1814	26 July 1811	Appointed by the Council of Regency as the highest authority in the Río de la Plata with the positions of Captain General and Governor of the Provinces of the Río de la Plata and President of the Royal Audience of Buenos Aires, although without the title of “viceroy”. He resisted a 20-month siege in Montevideo until, finally, the city fell into the hands of the government of Buenos Aires. Vigodet was then arrested and taken to Rio de Janeiro.	Manuel Antonio de la Bodega y Mollinedo	Juan O'Donojú	Ferdinand VII
-		Gaspar de Vigodet	18 November 1811	23 June 1814	26 July 1811	Appointed by the Council of Regency as the highest authority in the Río de la Plata with the positions of Captain General and Governor of the Provinces of the Río de la Plata and President of the Royal Audience of Buenos Aires, although without the title of “viceroy”. He resisted a 20-month siege in Montevideo until, finally, the city fell into the hands of the government of Buenos Aires. Vigodet was then arrested and taken to Rio de Janeiro.	Miguel de Lardizabal	José Miguel de Carvajal-Vargas	Ferdinand VII
13		Pedro Antonio Olañeta	27 May 1825			In May 1825, King Ferdinand VII of Spain appointed Pedro Antonio de Olañeta as viceroy of the Río de la Plata, unaware that he had died three months earlier at the Battle of Tumusla (Upper Peru).	No secretary	Francisco Cea Bermúdez	Ferdinand VII

== See also ==
- List of governors in the Viceroyalty of the Río de la Plata
- Argentine War of Independence
- United Provinces of the Río de la Plata
- History of Argentina
- History of Bolivia
- History of Paraguay
- History of Uruguay
- Spanish Guinea
- Viceroyalty of Peru

== Bibliography ==
- Abad de Santillán, Diego. Historia Argentina (in Spanish). Buenos Aires: TEA (Tipográfica Editora Argentina).
- Lynch, John. Spanish Colonial Administration, 1782–1810: The Intendant System in the Viceroyalty of the Río de la Plata. London, University of London, Athlone Press, 1958.
