= Nicolás Antonio de Arredondo =

Spanish politician

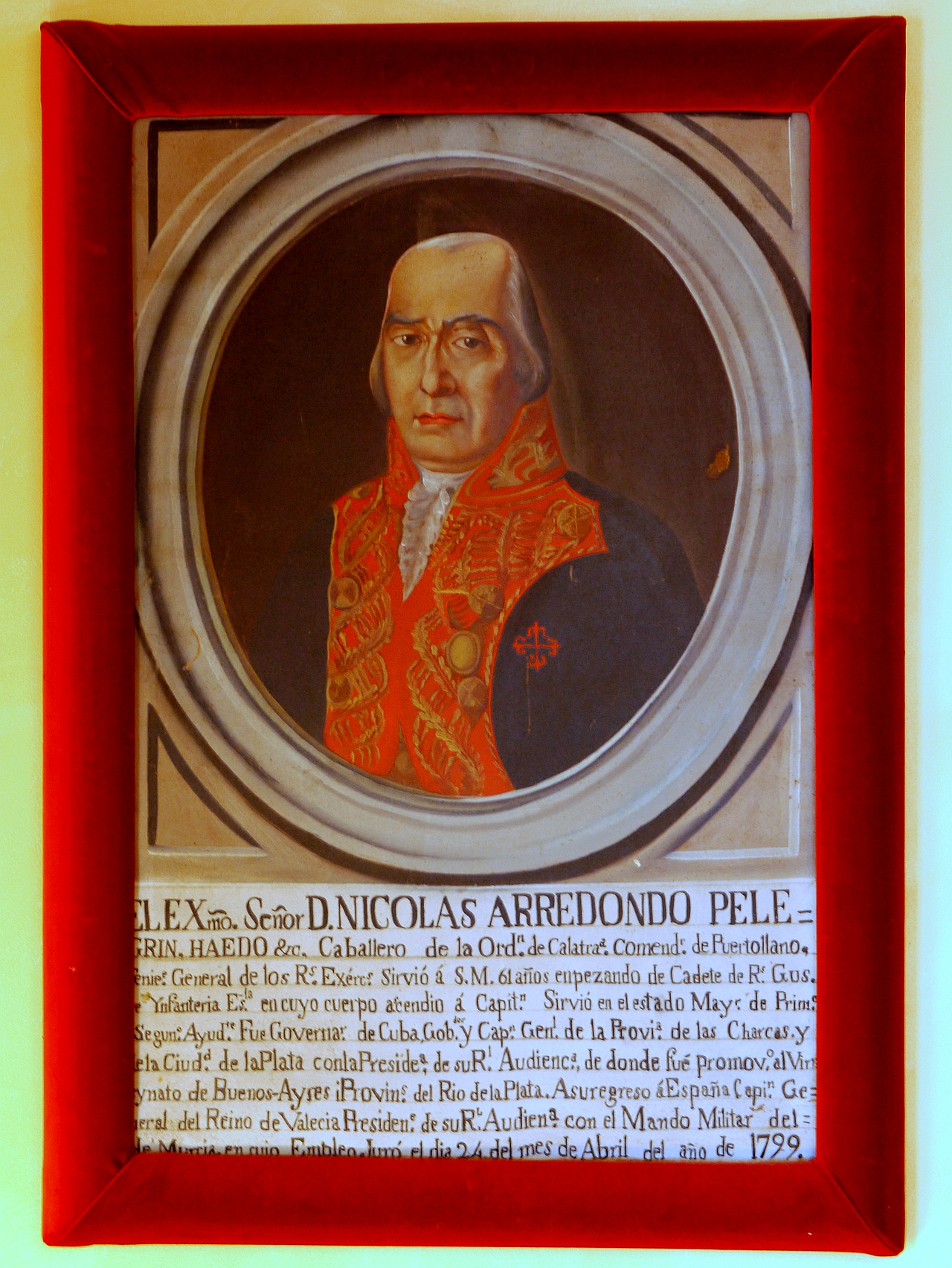

Viceroy of the Río de la Plata
- In office 4 December 1789 – 16 March 1795
- Monarch: Charles IV of Spain
- Preceded by: Nicolás del Campo
- Succeeded by: Pedro Melo de Portugal

Personal details
- Born: Nicolás Antonio de Arredondo; 17 April 1726 Bárcena de Cicero, Spain
- Died: 4 April 1802 (aged 75)
- Occupation: Politician
- Profession: Military man

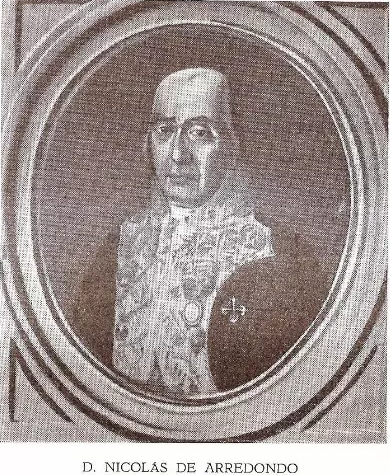
Nicolás Antonio de Arredondo

Nicolás Antonio de Arredondo, Pelegrin, Ahedo Zorilla de San Martin y Venero (17 April 1726 – 4 April 1802) was a Spanish soldier and politician born in the village of Bárcena de Cicero on Spain's Atlantic Coast. He was the fourth viceroy of the Río de la Plata between 4 December 1789 and 16 March 1795.

== Biography ==
Before entering politics Arredondo fought in wars on Italy, where he earned military prestige. He was sent to the Americas and took political roles in Cuba. Afterwards, he was designated as governor in La Plata, modern Bolivia. In 1789 he was designated as viceroy of the Viceroyalty of the Río de la Plata, after the departure of Nicolás del Campo. As viceroy, he improved the layout of the streets of Buenos Aires and fortified the city of Montevideo. He created local councils and police corps, gave a boost to animal husbandry, mediated between the conflicts of business people and ranchers, and fought against contraband. He resigned in 1795 and returned to Spain, remaining involved in politics until his death.

His son, José Joaquín de Arredondo, was a Spanish soldier in New Spain in the two decades before Mexican independence.

Government offices
Preceded by Nicolás del Campo	Viceroy of the Río de la Plata; 1789–1795	Succeeded by Pedro Melo de Portugal y Villena
