= Pedro Melo de Portugal =

Spanish soldier and politician

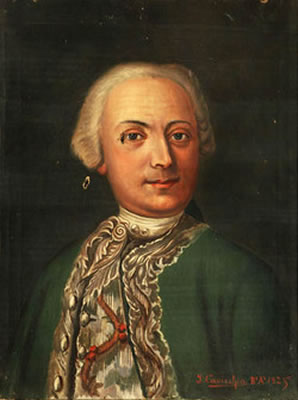

Viceroy of the Río de la Plata
- In office 1795–1797
- Monarch: Charles IV of Spain
- Preceded by: Nicolás Antonio de Arredondo
- Succeeded by: Antonio Olaguer Feliú

Personal details
- Born: Pedro José António Melo de Portugal y de la Rocha Calderón; 29 April 1733 Extremadura, Spain
- Died: 15 April 1797 (aged 63) Montevideo, Uruguay
- Resting place: Iglesia de San Juan Bautista
- Occupation: Politician
- Profession: Military man
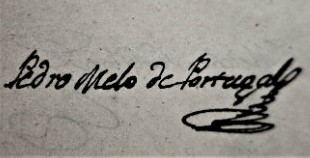
- Signature

Military service
- Allegiance: Spain
- Branch/service: Spanish Army
- Rank: General

Pedro de Melo de Portugal y Vilhena (29 April 1733 in Badajoz – 15 April 1797 in Buenos Aires) was a Spanish soldier and politician, who served as viceroy in the Rio de la Plata.

Coat of arms of Pedro Melo de Portugal, viceroy of the Río de la Plata.

== Biography ==
He was a member of the Melo de Portugal family, a minor branch of the Portuguese House of Braganza. Pedro de Melo served in many military roles in Spain before moving to South America in 1770.

He was designated as Governor of Paraguay in 1778 and remained Intendant Governor of the Intendency of Paraguay after the Viceroyalty of the Río de la Plata was created. He was member of the Real Audiencia and worked for the creation in 1794 of a Royal Counsel with viceroy Nicolás Antonio de Arredondo.

He was designated viceroy after the resignation of Arredondo, on 16 March 1795. He kept the main policies of previous viceroys: improve the streets of Buenos Aires, or fortified defenses for Montevideo, but he had to face Portuguese incursions on the Banda Oriental. He created laws to deal with the shortage of bread, improved the viceroyal residence, and received ships from the Pacific Ocean.

Pedro de Melo was interested in expanding the colonization towards the coastline of Patagonia, ordering Félix de Azara to design plans for that purpose. However, Pedro de Melo died before being able to fulfill them.

Pedro de Melo died on 15 April 1797, still being viceroy. The Real Audiencia took power for a brief period, to prevent a power vacuum in the meantime that the news arrived to Spain and a new viceroy was designated. Antonio Olaguer Feliú arrived shortly after.

== Notes ==
Government offices
Preceded by Agustín Fernando de Pinedo	Governor of Paraguay; 1778–1787	Succeeded by Joaquín Alós y Brú
Preceded by Nicolás Antonio de Arredondo	Viceroy of the Río de la Plata; 1795–1797	Succeeded by Antonio Olaguer Feliú
