= Nicolás del Campo =

The Marquess of Loreto
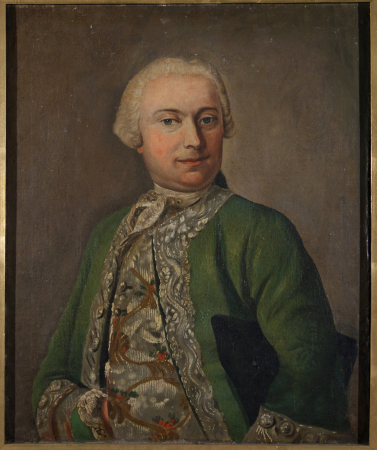

Viceroy of the Viceroyalty of the Río de la Plata
- In office March 7, 1784 – December 4, 1789
- Monarchs: Charles III of Spain; Charles IV of Spain
- Preceded by: Juan José de Vértiz y Salcedo
- Succeeded by: Nicolás de Arredondo

Personal details
- Born: March 12, 1725 Seville, Spain
- Died: February 17, 1803 (aged 77) Madrid, Spain
- Occupation: Military

Military service
- Allegiance: Spanish Empire
- Branch/service: Spanish Army
- Rank: Brigadier general

Nicolás Francisco Cristóbal del Campo, 2nd Marquuess of Loreto (March 12, 1725 – February 17, 1803) was a Spanish politician and soldier who occupied several posts in the Spanish American colonies, mainly in the River Plate area.

== Biography ==
He was born in Seville to Josefa Arcadia Rodríguez and Nicolás Ignacio del Campo y Cuesta, 1st Marquess of Loreto. His father was of Flemish descent, and his original family name, van der Velde, was Hispanicized to del Campo.

Del Campo was a member of the Seville Economic Society of Friends of the Country, and later joined the Spanish Army. He rose to the rank of brigadier general and participated in the Spanish invasion of Portugal (1762) and the Great Siege of Gibraltar (1779).

The Marquess of Loreto was appointed Viceroy of the Río de la Plata, and served from March 7, 1784, to December 4, 1789; he succeeded Juan José de Vértiz y Salcedo after the latter's resignation.

As with other viceroys, he was a professional military officer but did not have experience in politics in Spanish America before arriving in Buenos Aires. He became an honest and capable administrator, and in 1785 initiated the improvement and expansion of the Real Audiencia de Buenos Aires created in 1783 by his predecessor. He established the subdivisions on Intendancies (Spanish: Intendencias) in the River Plate, instituting eight Intendancies, and a new system of relations between the mayors and the viceroy. Four intendancies were in Upper Peru (La Paz, Potosí, Cochabamba, Charcas, and Paraguay). The other three comprised Buenos Aires and the region south to Patagonia; Córdoba; and Salta, including the present Argentine Northwest.

He fomented the economy in many levels, promoting agriculture and cattle raising, looking for new sources of good quality salts at low cost to facilitate the salting of meat for export. He improved port infrastructure, fought contraband and introduced new policies of pacific co-existence and commerce with the natives. He also granted bereavement benefits for widows and orphans of Navy personnel; the 1785 edict created the first pension system in what today is Argentina.

Virrey Loreto Street, in the Belgrano ward of Buenos Aires is named in his honor.

Government offices
Preceded by Juan José de Vértiz y Salcedo	Viceroy of the Río de la Plata; 1784–1789	Succeeded by Nicolás Antonio de Arredondo
