= Betsey (1791 ship) =

History

Great Britain
- Name: Betsey
- Owner: R.Leigh & Co. (1798)
- Launched: 1791, Bermuda
- Captured: 3 June 1798

General characteristics
- Tons burthen: 142 (bm)
- Complement: 1793: 100; 1798: 25; 1798: 25
- Armament: 1793: 16 × 6-pounder guns; 1798: 12 × 6-pounder guns; 1798: 12 × 6-pounder guns

Betsey was launched in Bermuda in 1791. She never appeared in Lloyd's Register. On 11 April 1793 Captain William Doyle acquired a letter of marque. The size of her crew indicates that the intent was to sail her as a privateer. Lloyd's List for 1793 and 1794 makes no mention of a privateer Betsey.

Because Betsey is a common name and she did not appear in Lloyd's Register it had not yet been possible to discover what she did between 1793 and 1798.

Captain Daniel Hayward acquired a letter of marque on 13 March 1798. Two weeks later, on 27 March 1798, Captain James Barrow acquired a letter of marque. Barrow, or Hayward, sailed from Liverpool on 22 April 1798, bound for the Windward Coast. Betsey was a slave ship, engaged in the triangular trade in enslaved people. However, the French captured Betsey before she had embarked any slaves.

Lloyd's List reported that on 3 June, the French frigate Convention had captured Betsey, Hayward, master, off the coast of Africa. Betsey had been on her way from Liverpool to Africa. (Note: There is no record of a French frigate with the name Convention. The 74-gun Sceptre bore the name Convention between 1792 and 1800.) (Note: Hayward died on 6 March 1800 while on his second voyage on the slave ship Active.)
