= Elizabeth (1798 Liverpool ship) =

British slave ship (1798–1805)

History

Great Britain
- Name: Elizabeth
- Owner: John Bolton (merchant)
- Launched: 1798, Liverpool
- Captured: 1805

General characteristics
- Tons burthen: 310, or 327 (bm)
- Complement: 1798: 25; 1798: 35; 1800: 25; 1801: 25; 1804: 30; 1805: 35
- Armament: 1798: 18 × 9-pounder guns; 1798: 18 × 9-pounder guns; 1798: 18 × 9-pounder guns + 2 × 18-pounder carronades; 1800: 20 × 6&9-pounder guns; 1801: 20 × 6&9-pounder guns; 1804: 20 × 9&12-pounder cannons; 1805: 18 × 9-pounder guns

Elizabeth was launched at Liverpool in 1798. She made five complete voyages as a slave ship in the triangular trade in enslaved people. Spanish privateers captured her in 1805 while she was on her sixth voyage after she had embarked enslaved people and took her into Montevideo.

== Career ==
Elizabeth first appeared in Lloyd's Register (LR), in 1798.

Year	Master	Owner	Trade	Source
1798	H.Bond; C.Kinseale	J.Bolton	Liverpool–St Vincent; Liverpool–Africa	LR

Captain Henry Bond acquired a letter of marque on 19 March 1798.

1st voyage transporting enslaved people (1798–1799): Captain Charles Kneal acquired a letter of marque on 9 October 1798. Captain Kneale sailed on 12 November. In 1798, 160 vessels sailed from English ports, bound on voyages to acquire and transport enslaved people; 149 of these vessels sailed from Liverpool.

Kneale acquired captives at Bonny and arrived at Martinique on 26 July 1799 with 455 captives. Elizabeth left Martinique on 31 August and arrived back at Liverpool on 12 October. She had left on her voyage with 53 crew members and she had suffered nine crew deaths on her voyage.

2nd voyage transporting enslaved people (1800–1801): Captain John Mill acquired a letter of marque on 1 March 1800. In 1800, 133 vessels sailed from English ports, bound on voyages to acquire and transport enslaved people; 120 of these vessels sailed from Liverpool.

Mill acquired captives at Iles de Los and sailed from there on 20 September. Elizabeth arrived at Suriname on 7 November with 313 captives. She sailed from Suriname on 15 February 1801 and arrived at Liverpool on 20 April. She had left the United Kingdom with 53 crew members and had suffered 34 crew deaths on her voyage.

3rd voyage transporting enslaved people (1801–1802): Captain James Giles acquired a letter of marque on 26 May 1801. He sailed on 4 June 1801. In 1801, 147 vessels sailed from English ports, bound on voyages to acquire and transport enslaved people; 122 of these vessels sailed from Liverpool.

Giles acquired captives first on the Gold Coast, and then at Bonny. Elizabeth arrived at Demerara on 25 December. She arrived back at Liverpool on 7 June 1802. She had left the United Kingdom with 49 crew members and had suffered four crew deaths on her voyage.

4th voyage transporting enslaved people (1802–1803): Because Giles sailed during the Peace of Amiens, he did not sail with a letter of marque. He sailed on 6 August 1802. In 1802, 155 vessels sailed from English ports, bound on voyages to acquire and transport enslaved people; 122 of these vessels sailed from Liverpool.

Giles acquired captives at Cape Coast Castle. Elizabeth sailed from Africa on 6 February 1803 and arrived at Demerara in March. She sailed from Demerara on 20 April and arrived back at Liverpool on 31 May.

5th voyage transporting enslaved people (1804): When Captain Giles sailed again, war with France had resumed. He acquired a letter of marque on 10 January 1804. He sailed from Liverpool on 26 January. In 1804, 147 vessels sailed from English ports, bound on voyages to acquire and transport enslaved people; 126 of these vessels sailed from Liverpool.

Giles acquired captives at Bonny. Elizabeth left Africa on 24 May and arrived at Havana on 22 July with 334 captives. She sailed from Havana on 18 September and arrived back at Liverpool on 2 November. She had left Liverpool with 45 crew members and had suffered eight crew deaths on her voyage. (Note: Giles went on to command Prince William.)

6th voyage transporting enslaved people (1805–loss): Captain Samuel Hensley acquired a letter of marque on 9 January 1805. He sailed from Liverpool on 29 January.

On 2 February Elizabeth repelled an attack by a French privateer at 48°2′N 12°15′W in a single ship action. The privateer had "Swift of Norfolk" painted on her stern and was armed with twenty 24-pounder carronades on her main deck and lighter guns on her quarterdeck. Elizabeth had one man killed and six wounded, and suffered extensive damage.

Elizabeth acquired captives at the Congo River and sailed from there on 14 August.

== Fate ==
In December 1805 Lloyd's List reported that Elizabeth, Hensley, master, and Nelly, Selden, master, had been captured at Angola.

Elizabeth and Nelly were among the seven vessels off the Congo River that had fallen prey to a privateer. (Note: Other vessels included Active, Clarendon, Rebecca, and William.) The privateer was described as being of 22 guns and 350 men. Nelly's captor sent her to the River Plate. A second report named the captors as L'Orient, of 14 guns, and Dromedario, of 22 guns. The captured vessels arrived in the River Plate before 12 November. Elizabeth arrived at Montevideo on 17 October with 128 enslaved people.

Spanish records report that in June 1805, Viceroy Sobremonte, of Argentina, issued two letters of marque, one for Dolores (24 guns), Currand, master, and Berro y Errasquin, owner, and one for Dromedario (20 guns), Hippolito Mordel, master, and Canuerso y Masini, owner. The two sailed for the African coast, looking to capture enslaving ships. In three months of cruising Dolores captured three ships and one brig, carrying a total 600 enslaved people. Dromedario captured five ships, carrying a total of 500 enslaved people.

In 1805, 30 British slave ships were lost. Thirteen were lost on the coast of Africa. During the period 1793 to 1807, war, rather than maritime hazards or slave resistance, was the greatest cause of vessel losses among British slave vessels.
