= Juan de la Cruz Cano y Olmedilla =

Spanish cartographer

South America map by Juan de la Cruz, 1775

Juan de la Cruz Cano y Olmedilla was a Spanish cartographer. For many years, Cano was the cartographer of the king Carlos III of Spain. He made maps of Spain and of the Spanish possessions in Latin America. He is especially known for a 1775 map of South America.

== Biography ==
Juan de la Cruz Cano y Olmedilla was born in Madrid on 14 May 1734. In 1752, the Marquess of Ensenada sent him – along with Tomás López – to Paris to study engraving under Jean-Baptiste Bourguignon d'Anville. He remained in France until 1760; during his time there, he and Tomás López published a map of the Gulf of Mexico in 1755. In 1760, he became a member of the Royal Academy of Fine Arts of San Fernando, attaining the status of académico de mérito (meritorious academician) in 1764. He was also an honorary member of the Real Sociedad Bascongada de Amigos del País.

In 1765, the Duke of Grimaldi – then Chief Minister of Spain – commissioned him to create a map of South America at a scale of 1:5,000,000. To this end, he consulted maps held by the Secretariat of State, the Council of the Indies, and other public archives. In 1775, he completed a wall map at a scale of 1:4,000,000 – an engraving measuring 176 x 216 cm, produced using eight copper plates. It is considered the most comprehensive map of South America created prior to the advent of modern cartographic methods.
