= Real Audiencia of Buenos Aires =

Former courts of the Spanish crown

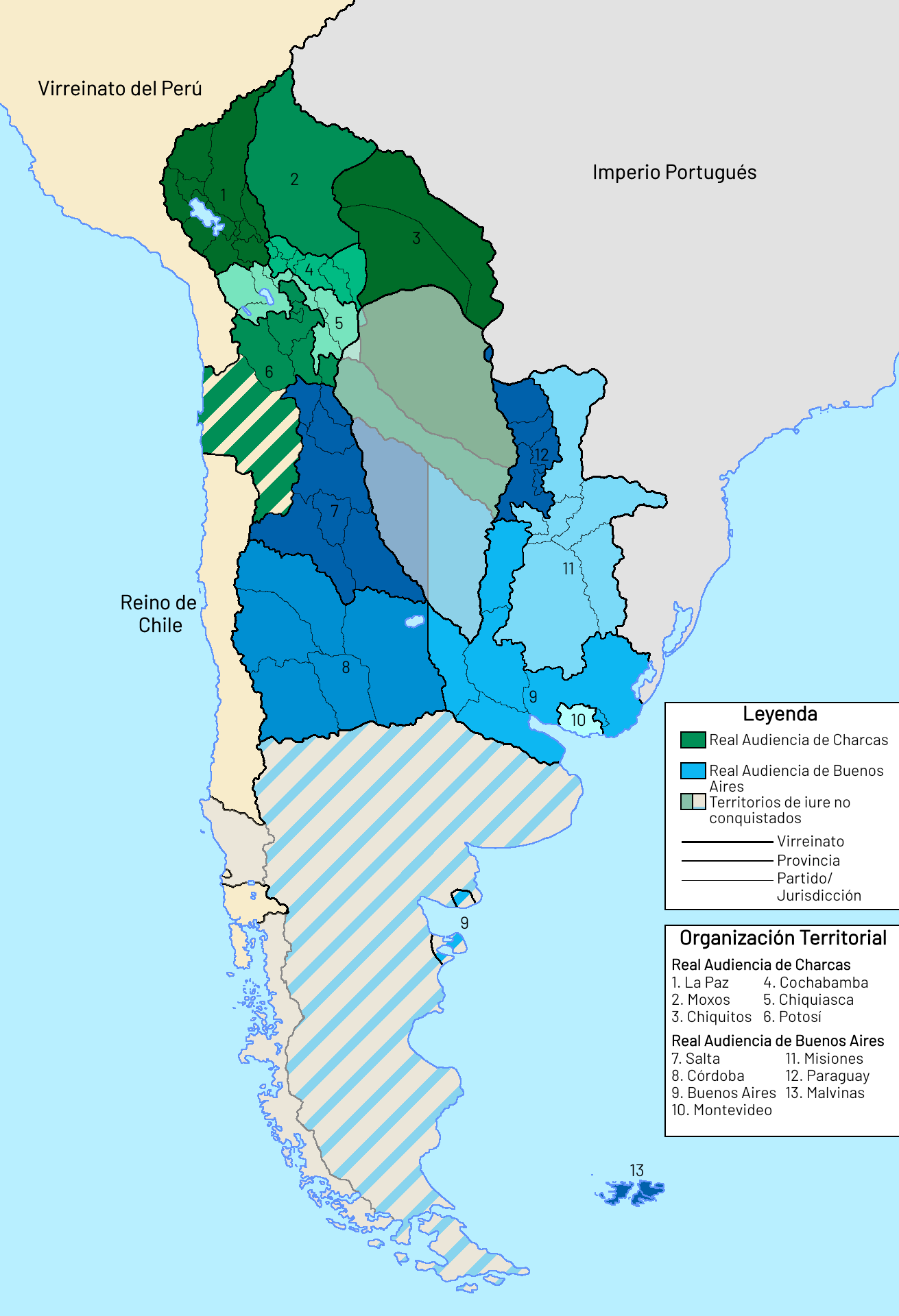
In shades of blue, the Royal Court of Buenos Aires in 1783.

The Real Audiencia de Buenos Aires, were two audiencias, or highest courts, of the Spanish crown, which operated in Buenos Aires. The jurisdiction of the first covered the territory of the Governorate of the Río de la Plata and operated from 1661 to 1671. The second began to function in 1783 and had jurisdiction over the parts of the Viceroyalty of the Río de la Plata not covered by the Audiencia de Charcas, that is to say the intendancies of Buenos Aires, Córdoba del Tucumán, Salta del Tucumán and Paraguay. In 1810, after the May Revolution, it was suspended, and in 1813 the Assembly of the Year XIII permanently abolished it. The Audiencias operated in the city's cabildo building.

== History ==
=== Audiencia of Buenos Aires during the Governorate ===
Created by Philip IV by decree (real cédula) in 1661, it covered the governorates of Río de la Plata, Paraguay (established in 1617) and Tucumán. This Audiencia was dissolved in 1671.

The Consolidated Laws of the Indies of 1680, Law XIII (Audiencia y Chancilleria Real de la Ciudad de la Trinidad, Puerto de Buenos Ayres) Title XV (De las Audiencias y Chancillerias Reales de las Indias) of Book II, compiles the limits and officials of this Audiencia.

=== Audiencia of Buenos Aires under the Viceroyalty ===
Created during the reign of Charles III of Spain (1759–1788) and under the rule of viceroy Juan José de Vértiz y Salcedo, in 1783, as part of the Viceroyalty of the Río de la Plata, from 1 August 1776.

Its jurisdiction included the aforesaid intendencias and the subordinate Governorates of Misiones and Montevideo.

The Regents (Presidents) were :

- Manuel Antonio Arredondo y Pelegrín (1783-1787)
- Benito de la Mata Linares (1787-1803)
- Lucas Muñoz y Cubero (1804-1810).
