= Juan José de Vértiz y Salcedo =

Spanish colonial politician

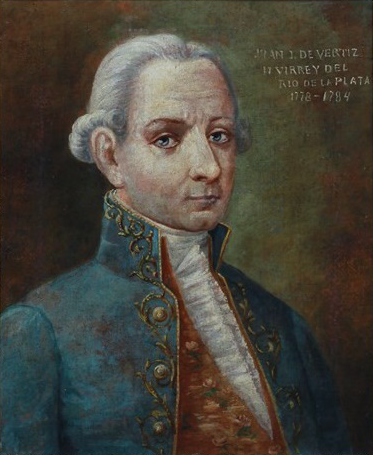

Viceroy of the Viceroyalty of the Río de la Plata
- In office 26 Jun 1778 – 7 Mar 1784
- Monarch: Charles III of Spain
- Preceded by: Pedro de Cevallos
- Succeeded by: Nicolás del Campo

Personal details
- Born: 1719 Mérida, Yucatán, Viceroyalty of New Spain (now Mexico)
- Died: 1799 (aged 79–80) Madrid, Spain
- Occupation: Military

Military service
- Allegiance: Viceroyalty of the Río de la Plata

Juan José de Vértiz y Salcedo (1719–1799) was a Spanish colonial politician born in New Spain (now Mexico), and Viceroy of the Río de la Plata.

== Biography ==
He was born in 1719 in Mérida, Yucatán (now Mexico). Son of a prominent peninsular politician, he studied in Spain and had a military education, serving in several Spanish campaigns, such as in Italy and France. He held the post of Governor of Buenos Aires, under the administration of the Viceroyalty of Peru and Viceroyalty of Río de la Plata, having as his main priority to expel the Portuguese from the Banda Oriental, present-day Uruguay, without success. Nevertheless, his government was highly praised.

He assumed the post of Viceroy in 1778, having had a wide set of accomplishments, developing a local economy, colonizing uninhabited lands (or inhabited by local natives), establishing local government (Intendencias) all over the viceroyalty and prepared the way to the foundation of the Real Audiencia de Buenos Aires. He enacted the royal rulings that helped to boost commerce, and open the customs. As an economic policy, he encouraged artisans to form guilds, following European models. During his administration, he established the first city census, which at the time showed about 37,000 inhabitants. He also created the first theatre in the city: La Ranchería.

He open the "Casa Cuna" or "Hospital de expósitos", with the purpose of giving shelter to homeless children. This institution was founded by the Jesuits. He also created the "Protomedicato" to watch the practice of medicine and prevent the practise of curanderism. This institution was ruled by Miguel Gorman, and started the teaching of medicine in Buenos Aires.

He played an important role in the repression of the uprising of Túpac Amaru II in Peru. In 1784 he asked to return to Spain, leaving the viceroyalty and giving it to his successor Nicolás del Campo. He died in Spain in 1799.

== Bibliography ==
- Abad de Santillán, Diego. Historia Argentina (in Spanish). Buenos Aires: TEA (Tipográfica Editora Argentina).

Government offices
Preceded by Pedro de Cevallos	Viceroy of the Río de la Plata; 1778–1784	Succeeded by Nicolás del Campo
