= Rafael de Sobremonte, 3rd Marquis of Sobremonte =

Spanish colonial administrator and aristocrat

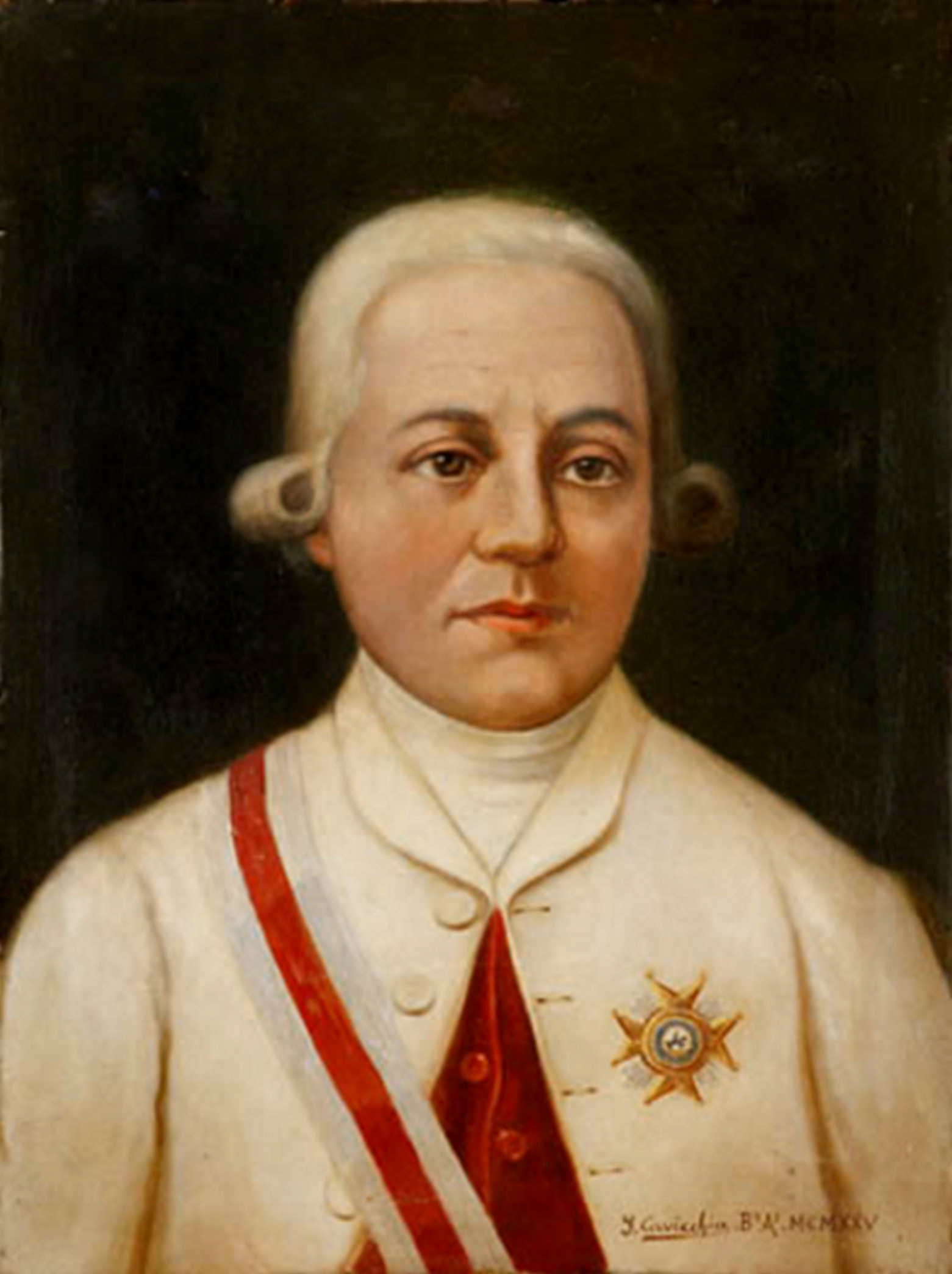
- Portrait of Rafael de Sobremonte by Ignacio Cavicchia.

9th Viceroy of the Río de la Plata
- In office 24 April 1804 – 10 February 1807
- Monarch: Charles IV of Spain – Junta of Seville
- Preceded by: Joaquín del Pino y Rozas
- Succeeded by: Santiago de Liniers

Personal details
- Born: Rafael de Sobremonte y Núñez del Castillo; 27 November 1745 Seville, Spain
- Died: 1827 (aged 82) Cádiz, Spain
- Party: Royalist
- Spouse(s): Doña Juana María de Larrazábal, Doña María Teresa Millán y Marlos (1820 -?)
- Occupation: Army officer

Military service
- Allegiance: Spain
- Battles/wars: British invasions of the Río de la Plata

Don Rafael de Sobremonte y Núñez del Castillo, 3rd Marquis of Sobremonte (Seville, 1745 – Cádiz, 1827), third Marquis of Sobremonte, was an aristocrat, military man and Spanish colonial administrator, and Viceroy of the Río de la Plata. He was accused of cowardice by the people of Buenos Aires after escaping the city during the British invasions of the Río de la Plata in 1806.

He was born in Seville, 27 November 1745. His parents were the Marquis Raimundo de Sobremonte, military man and magistrate, Knight of the Order of Charles III and member of the Seville Audience, and María Ángela Núñez Angulo y Ramírez de Arellano.

At fourteen years of age, he became a cadet in the Regimiento de las Reales Guardias Españolas. He served in different locations, such as Cartagena de Indias, Ceuta and Puerto Rico. In 1779, he was named Secretary to the Viceroy of the Río de la Plata, Juan José de Vértiz, with the rank of lieutenant colonel. He continued in that post with the successor, Nicolás del Campo.

== Family ==
Sobremonte married an Argentine lady; Doña Juana María de Larrazábal (first wife), having eleven children with her:

- Rafael de Sobremonte y Larrazábal, baptized in Buenos Aires, 22 October 1783.
- Marcos José de Sobremonte, baptized in Córdoba, 28 August 1785.
- Ramón María Agustín de Sobremonte, baptized in Córdoba, 9 October 1786.
- José María de Sobremonte, baptized in Córdoba, 4 January 1790.
- Manuel de Sobremonte, baptized in Córdoba, 11 August 1792.
- María de las Mercedes de Sobre Monte, baptized in Córdoba, 31 December 1793.
- Josefa Juana Nepomucena María del Carmen de Sobremonte, baptized in Córdoba, 24 April 1795.
- Juana de Sobremonte, baptized in Córdoba, 19 August 1796.
- José María Ramón de Sobremonte, baptized in Buenos Aires, 19 January 1798.
- José María Agustín de Sobremonte, baptized in Buenos Aires, 20 April 1799.
- Ramón José Agustín de Sobremonte, baptized in Montevideo, 4 August 1801.
- José Agustín María de Sobremonte, baptized in Buenos Aires, 19 April 1803.

He married again at seventy-five years of age with Doña María Teresa Millán y Marlos, widow of a nephew of Baltasar Hidalgo de Cisneros, the last Viceroy of the Río de la Plata.

== Posts held by Sobremonte ==
Rafael de Sobremonte held various posts in the Viceroyalty of the Río de la Plata:

- Viceroyalty Secretary, as a Lieutenant Coronel, during the Viceroyalty of Juan José de Vértiz y Salcedo (1779–1783)
- Governor of Córdoba del Tucumán (1783–1797)
- Sub-Inspector General of veteran troops and militias (1797–1804)
- President of the Audiencia de Río de la Plata (1804)
- Viceroy, Governor and Captain General of the Viceroyalty of the Río de la Plata (1804–1807)

== Governor of Córdoba ==
From 1784, and for almost fifteen years, he was Governor of Córdoba, distinguishing himself as an excellent administrator. He cleaned and repaired the city streets, ordered the construction of the first water system, carrying running water to Córdoba from the Primero River, and also the construction of defenses against river flooding. He opened a free public school, and ordered the constructions of rural schools. Created the Civil Law career at the University of San Carlos, improved the administration of the neighborhoods, started the first street lighting system and founded a women's hospital. Improved the justice system which was lacking in attention due to the distance to Buenos Aires.

During his administration he improved working conditions in the mines, and gave help to the mining industry in other provinces.

He built small forts and towns to try to defend against Indian raids: Río Cuarto, La Carlota, San Fernando, Santa Catalina, San Bernardo, San Rafael, Villa del Rosario, etc.

In 1797 he was named inspector general of the army of the Viceroyalty. In that capacity he labored to improve it to be able to resist an invasion from Brazil or England, specifically fortifying Montevideo and Colonia del Sacramento.

== Viceroyalty and the war with Britain ==
In April 1804, at the death of Viceroy Joaquín del Pino, he was named as his replacement as Viceroy of the Río de la Plata.

At that time, Great Britain and Spain were at war, creating the risk of an attack on Buenos Aires. He requested help from the Spanish Courts, but the Prime Minister Manuel Godoy answered that he should defend as best as he could, with no help forthcoming.

Believing there was a high probability of a British attack in Montevideo, he fortified that city and sent his best troops. It was the logical decision due to geography, and it would have been very difficult to dislodge them, had they captured that fortified port city.

The military of the viceroyalty had suffered many casualties lately, particularly during the native uprisings of Tupac Amaru. All the help he obtained were a few cannons and a shipment of muskets and the order to form a militia for the defense. The Viceroy understood that arming the creole civilian population, many of them influenced by revolutionary ideas, fomented by the American and French revolutions, was a dangerous strategy for the interests of the Crown. History would prove him right as only six years later the Argentine movement for independence was started.

He had few officers, mostly inexperienced and inefficient, and his navy was very weak. His army only had 2,500 men, most of them recruits, with little or no experience with arms.

As part of his defensive measures, he made a highly experienced officer of the Spanish Navy, Santiago de Liniers, the commander of the port of Ensenada de Barragán, about 70 km (43 mi) south of Buenos Aires, with orders to protect the coast. Liniers had sent him several warnings that the British had been seen exploring the coast of the River Plate.

== First British Invasion ==
On 24 June 1806, while attending a theater play with his family, the viceroy received news that British ships have been sighted along the coast. A report from Liniers indicated it consisted of despicable corsairs, without the bravery and the will to attack. Sobremonte left the play early going to Buenos Aires Fort, where he wrote an order to organize the defense. The next morning, the enemy's ships were sighted again on the Buenos Aires coast and cannon was shot from the fort with no effect.

He was not sure if it would be an attack, he sent brigadier Arce to repel any possible landing around the coastal city of Quilmes. Arce, commanding about 500 troops, let them land without attacking, sure they could not cross the marshes that separated the beaches from the mainland. The invaders did cross and Arce's troops retreated, allowing the British to march towards the city on June 26.

About 1,500 troops, commanded by William Carr Beresford landed from the ships commanded by Home Riggs Popham, the invasion plan's author.

Sobremonte gave a speech, directing able men to join the militias. Organization was lacking and not everybody was supplied with arms. Many muskets were supplied without proper shot or flints; swords and sabres were not well maintained. His own officers accused him of the chaos and confusion, but did little to remedy the situation.

The Viceroy attempted to form a defense by the Riachuelo, the city's southern border, ordering the burning of the Gálvez bridge (located on the site of today's Pueyrredón Bridge). He moved his troops to the west, believing the British would cross upriver, where he could attack them. The British captured the river-crossing boats, crossing to the north side. The defense failed there on their first attempt, and the viceroy gave incoherent orders which added to the chaos and confusion.

== Run away ==
Sobremonte left the city and decided to move to Córdoba, some 700 km (435 mi) away. Since the time of Vértiz there was a regulation that stated that if Buenos Aires was attacked by a foreign invader and the capital could not be held, there must be a move to the interior of the country and organize the defense in Córdoba, in order to defend the rest of the Viceroyalty, and have a fighting chance to reconquer the capital with some chances of success. Above all, neither the viceroy, nor his family should fall to the invaders, in order to avoid being forced to sign a capitulation.

Sobremonte, accused of cowardice by many at the time, followed the directive by moving to Córdoba.

Buenos Aires did not represent a significant portion of the economy of the viceroyalty at the time, and Sobremonte decided to consolidate his military position in Córdoba, reorganizing his forces, and trying to effect a reconquer of the capital over a military solid foundation, before reinforcements could be sent from Britain. He also understood that arming the populace for a defense implied giving effective power to the Creoles.

With about 2,000 men, and carrying the royal treasure, the viceroy left for Luján. He left the treasure there, which he could not carry due to the bad state of the roads in winter, then continued in the road to Córdoba. The local Buenos Aires militias abandoned him, for the most part because they did not want to leave their homes and families.

Once the city of Buenos Aires was captured by the British, the local merchants offered him the public coffers in exchange for the boats, ships he had captured, and the private moneys Sobremonte had taken. They wrote the viceroy, asking him for the handing of the treasure he had taken, and guided the British to the cabildo at Luján. The invaders captured the treasure, sending it to London, where it was paraded in triumph on its way to the bank vaults (not knowing that a month earlier, the porteños had reconquered the city).

== Reconquest and ouster ==
On 14 July, Sobremonte declared Córdoba temporary capital of the viceroyalty. He urged people to disobey any order coming from Buenos Aires during the occupation. He gathered the available troops and a few weeks later he marched with 3,000 troops back to Buenos Aires.

In the meantime, Liniers had brought the troops sent to Montevideo the previous year by the viceroy, joining them to the Buenos Aires volunteers being trained by Juan Martín de Pueyrredón and Martín de Álzaga. This army started retaking the city without waiting for the viceroy, accomplishing the task by 12 August.

Immediately after the reconquest, Álzaga called for an open cabildo of the people of Buenos Aires to refuse the viceroy command of the city. Liniers was named army commander, and civilian authority was given to the Audiencia Real. The measures were revolutionary, as it deposed the King's representative.

Sobremonte went to Montevideo with the remainder of his troops before it was invaded as the British fleet had never left the River Plate. Montevideo's citizens, influenced by Buenos Aires's feelings, refused to fight the invaders under Sobremonte. He left the city in order to fight the British at their landing place, but his troops deserted.

When Montevideo fell to the British, the open cabildo in Buenos Aires deposed him as viceroy, replacing him with Liniers. The citizen army fought this second invasion under Liniers and Álzaga, forcing the British surrender.

== Bibliography ==
- (in Spanish) Scenna, Miguel Ángel, Las brevas maduras. Memorial de la Patria, Tomo I, Ed. La Bastilla, Bs. As., 1984.
- (in Spanish) Garzón, Rafael, Sobremonte, Córdoba y las invasiones inglesas, Ed. Corregidor Austral, Córdoba, 2000.
- (in Spanish) Bischoff, Efraín, Historia de Córdoba, Ed. Plus Ultra, Bs. As., 1989.
- (in Spanish) Ruiz Moreno, Isidoro J., Campañas militares argentinas, Tomos I y II, Ed. Emecé, Bs. As., 2004–2006.
- (in Spanish) Lozier Almazán, Bernardo, Martín de Álzaga, Ed. Ciudad Argentina, Bs. As., 1998.
- (in Spanish) Crónica Histórica Argentina, Tomo I, Ed. CODEX, Bs. As., 1968.

Government offices
Preceded by Joaquín del Pino	Viceroy of the Río de la Plata; 1804–1807	Succeeded by Santiago de Liniers y Bremond
