= Plaza Primero de Mayo =

Square in Buenos Aires, Argentina

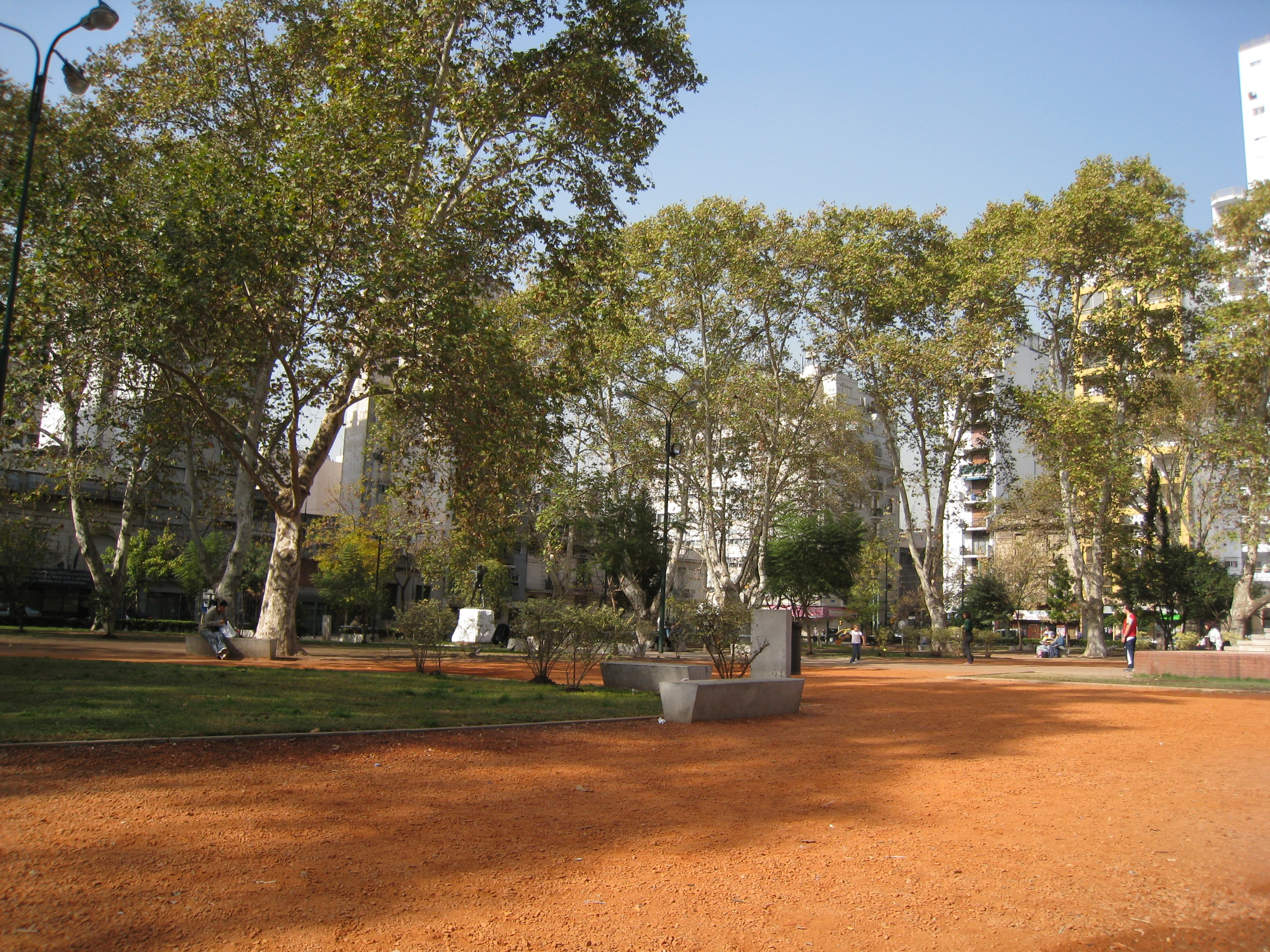
- current view of Plaza Primero de Mayo
- Interactive map of the Plaza Primero de Mayo area

General information
- Status: square
- Location: avenues Hipólito Yrigoyen, Pasco, Valentín Alsina, Balvanera, Buenos Aires, Argentina
- Coordinates: 34°36′41″S 58°23′54″W
- Inaugurated: 1925
- Renovated: 2006

Plaza Primero de Mayo is a square of Buenos Aires, Argentina, located in the neighborhood of Balvanera.

== History ==
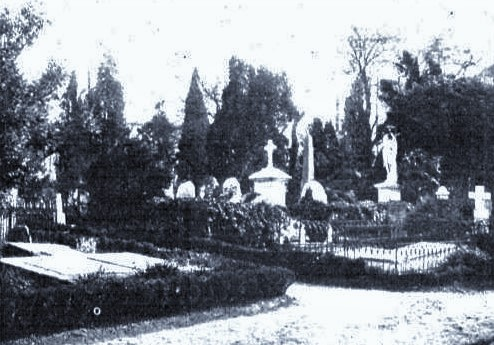
The British cemetery, c.1900

The Plaza Primero de Mayo was inaugurated in 1925, on land belonging to an old English Protestant cemetery, that operated on the site between 1833 and 1891. This cemetery was known by the name of La Victoria, located on the street of that name, now Hipólito Yrigoyen.

In 2006, during the works of remodeling of the Plaza were found rest of the cemetery, including graves with bones and gravestones. Among the illustrious people who were buried were John Thorne and Elisa Chitti de Brown, the wife of William Brown, honored with a bronze plaque placed in the square.
