= Parish Nuestra Señora de Balvanera =

Church building in Buenos Aires, Argentina

Parroquia Nuestra Señora de Balvanera
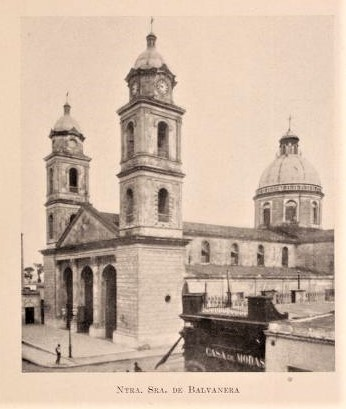
- View of the parish around 1930

Religion
- Affiliation: Roman Catholic Church
- Festival: Saint Expeditus
- Patron: Our Lady of Valvanera

Location
- Location: Bartolomé Mitre 2411, Balvanera, Buenos Aires
- Country: Argentina
- Interactive map of Parroquia Nuestra Señora de Balvanera

Architecture
- Architects: José Santos Sartorio; Antonio Picarel
- Style: Renaissance
- Established: 1833
- Completed: 1842

Parish Nuestra Señora de Balvanera is a Catholic church located in the district of Balvanera in the autonomous city of Buenos Aires, Argentina.

== History ==
The parish of Balvanera was established in 1833 during the government of Juan Manuel de Rosas. The first priest was Mariano Medrano Cabrera and he performed the first baptism, of Pedro José Crespo, on May 16, 1833. The first registered marriage was on July 2 of that same year, between Justo Avalos, born in San Nicolás de los Arroyos, and Feliciana Leyva, from the town of San Isidro. Antonino Canaveri and Lucrecia Calderón acted as witnesses.

Around 1839, Rosas entrusted the architect José Santos Sartorio with the construction of a new church, which was completed in 1842. Antonio Picarel was in charge of increasing the height of the building's dome.

The current facade of the Parroquia Nuestra Señora de Balvanera was completed in 1930.

== Gallery ==
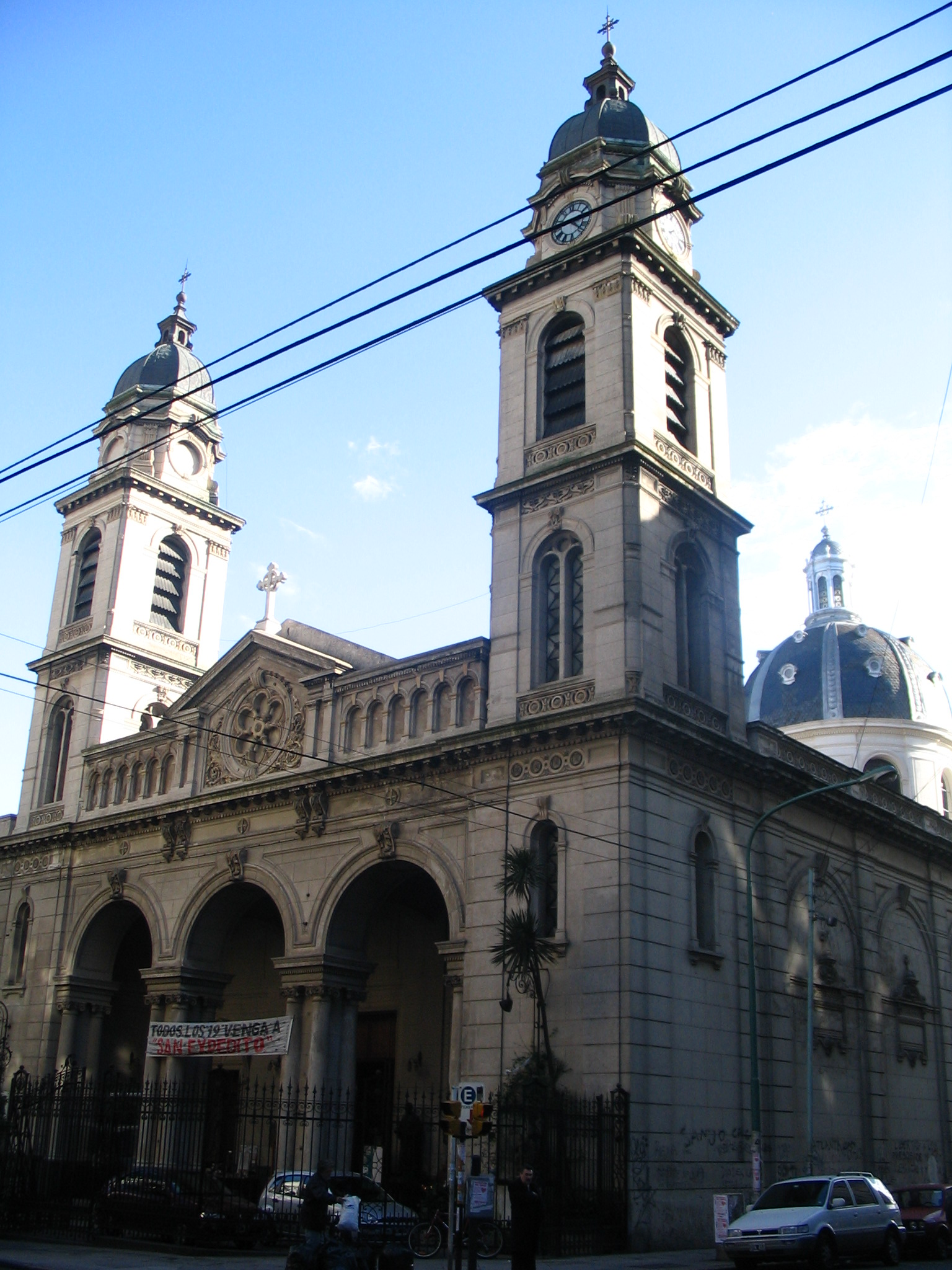
Balvanera Church

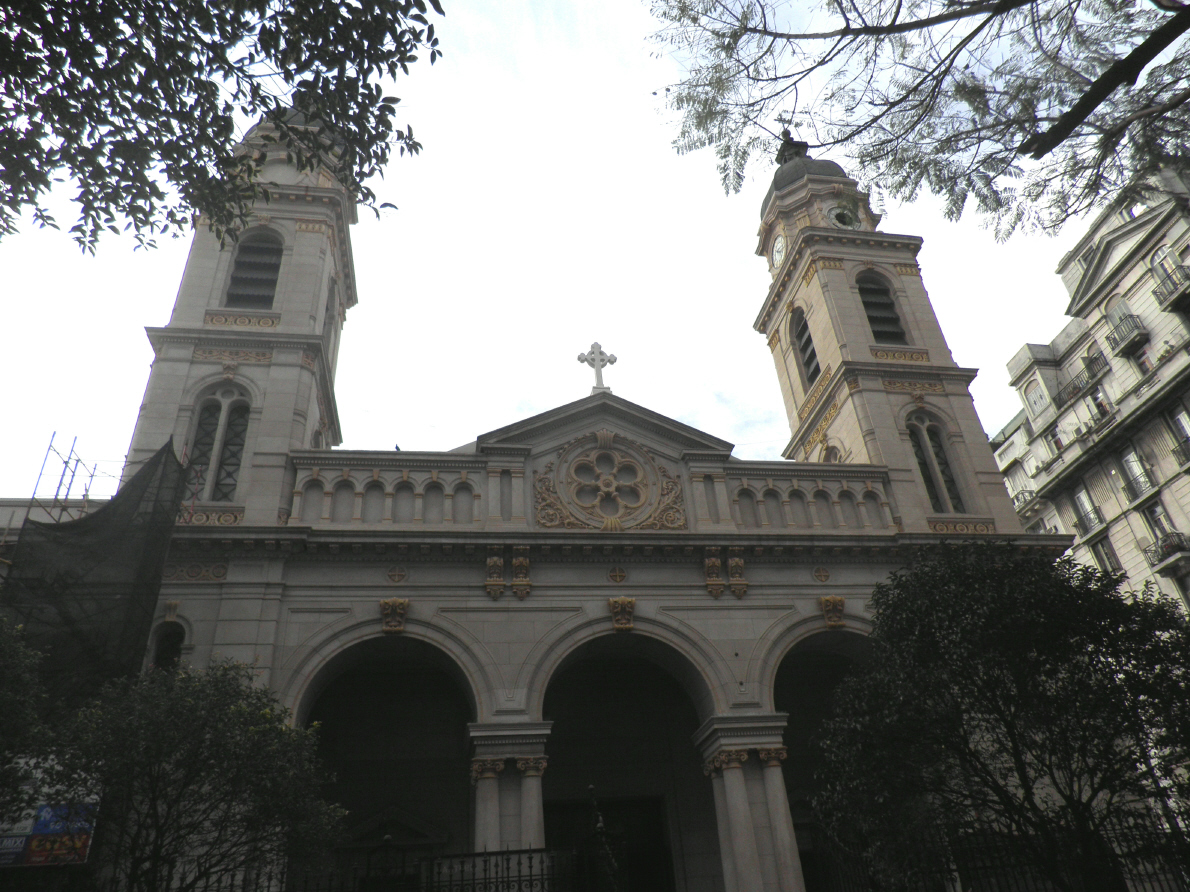
Parroquia Nuestra Señora de Balvanera

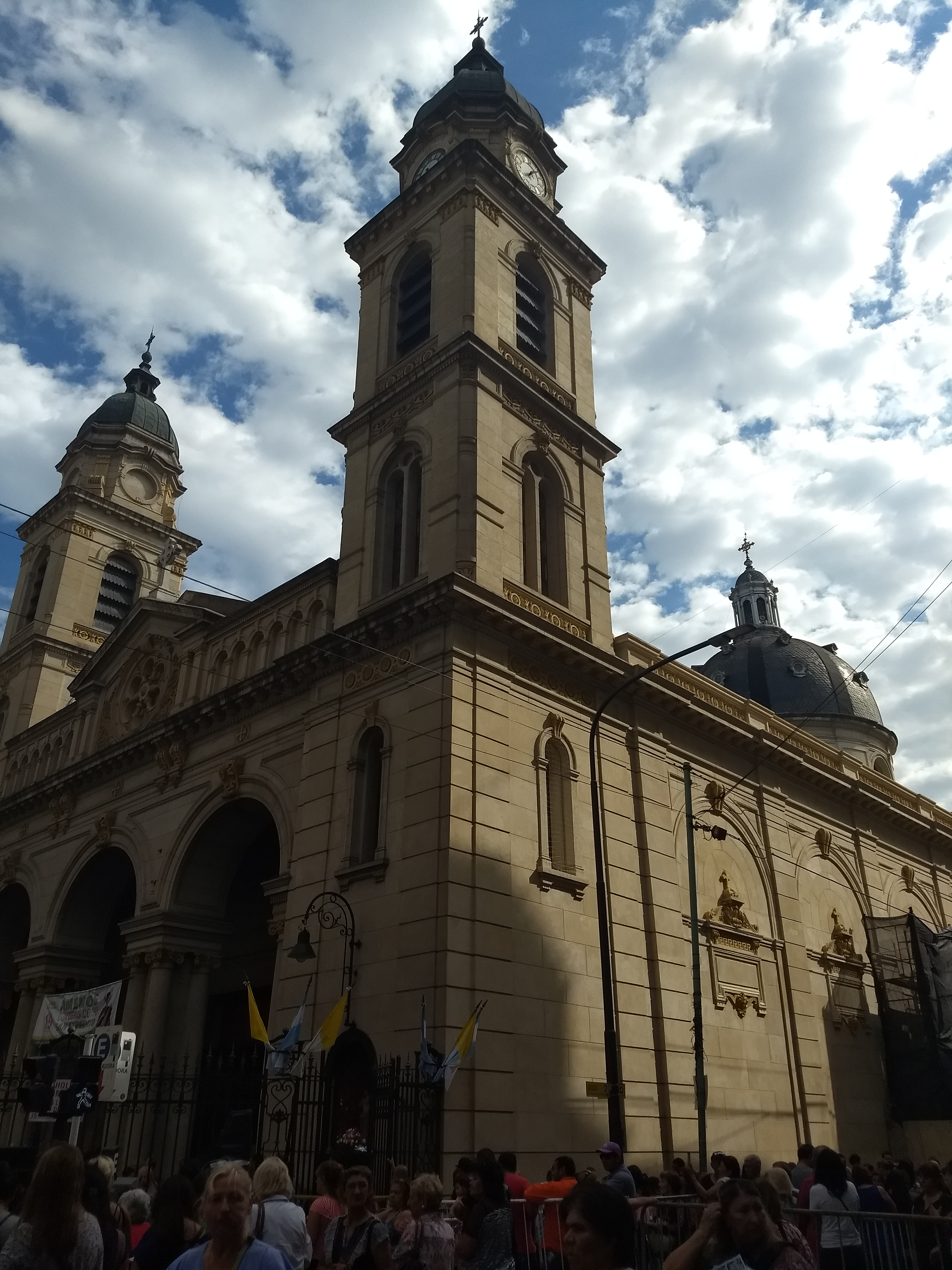
Feast of San Expedito

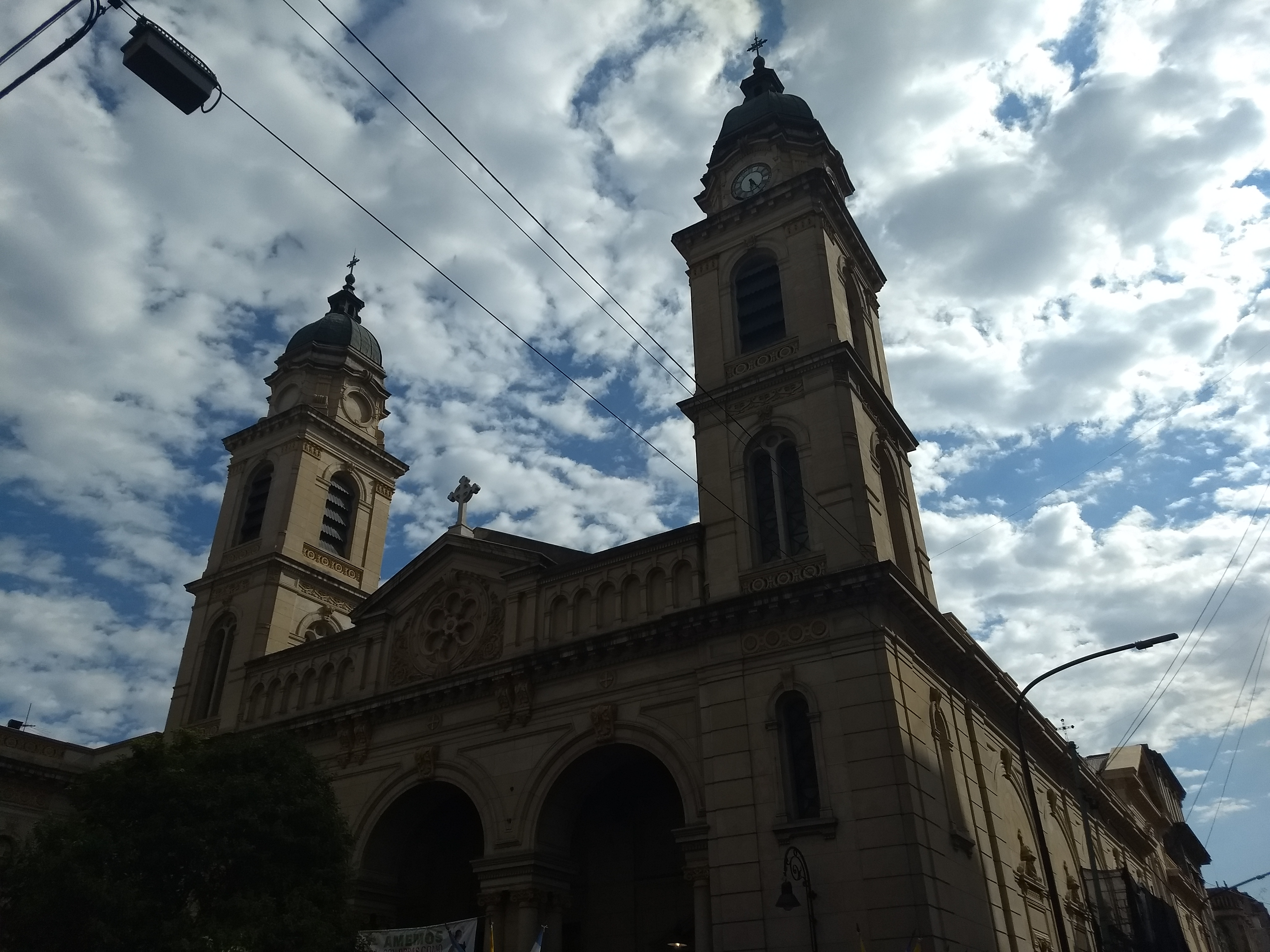
The Parish

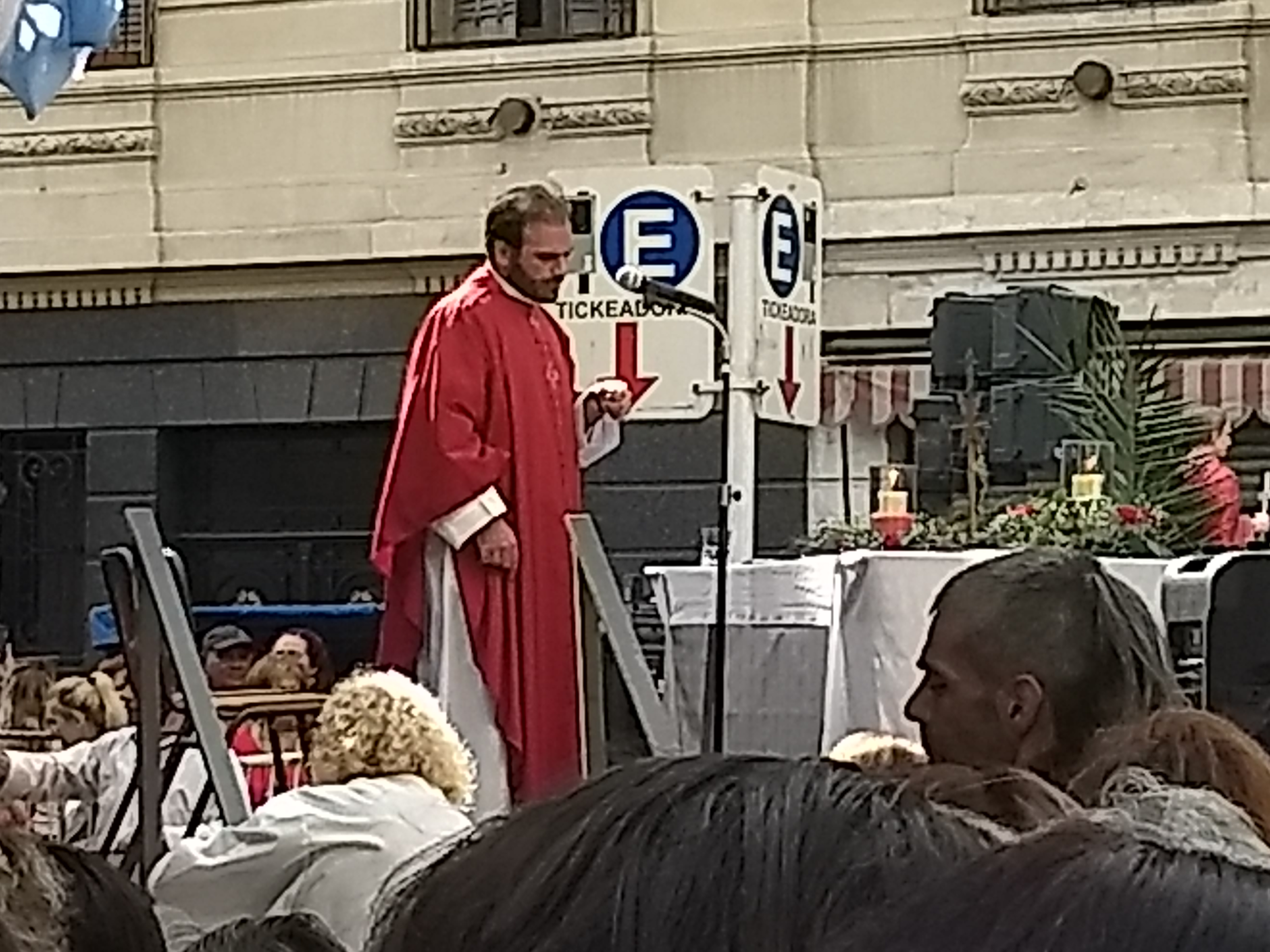
Feast of San Expedito
