= Confitería del Molino =

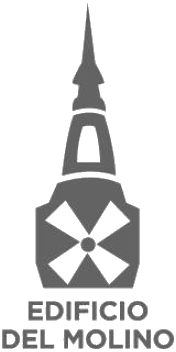

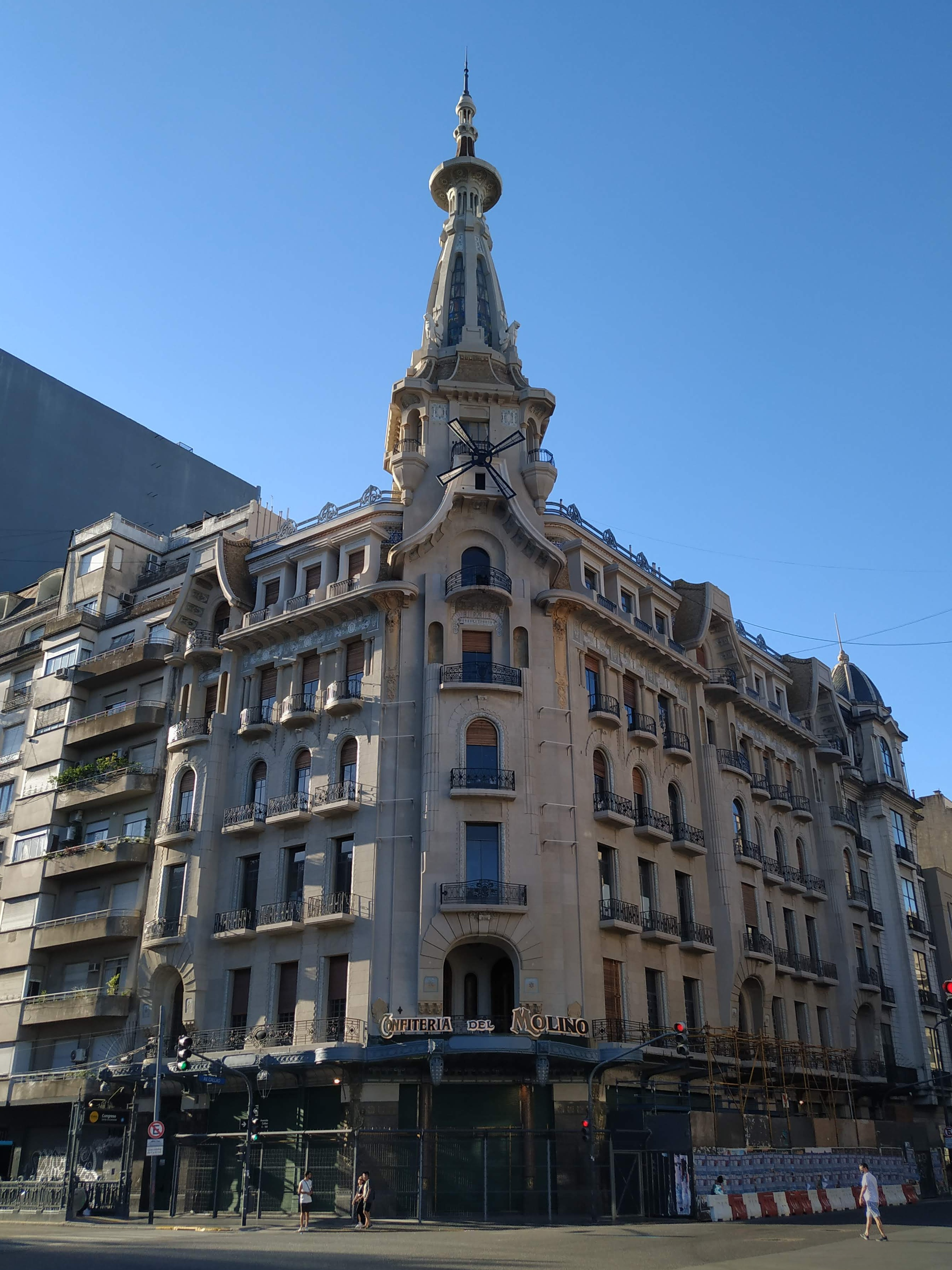
- El Molino after its restoration in 2022
- Interactive map of the Confitería del Molino area
- Alternative names: El Molino

General information
- Architectural style: Art Nouveau
- Location: Av. Rivadavia 1815, Buenos Aires, Argentina
- Coordinates: 34°36′32″S 58°23′32″W
- Construction started: 1912
- Inaugurated: 1916; 110 years ago
- Owner: Argentine National Congress

Technical details
- Floor count: 6
- Floor area: 5,450 m^{2} (58,700 sq ft)

Design and construction
- Architect: Francesco Gianotti
- Main contractor: GEOPÉ

Website
- delmolino.gob.ar

National Historic Monument of Argentina
- Designated: 1997

The Confitería del Molino (Spanish: The Mill) is an historical Art Nouveau style confitería (coffeehouse) in Buenos Aires, Argentina, located in front of the Palace of the National Congress and the Congressional Plaza, on the intersection of Callao and Rivadavia avenues in the barrio of Balvanera.

It first opened on 9 July 1916 and closed in 1997, the year when it was declared a National Historic Monument by the Argentine Congress. In recent years it has become dilapidated and derelict. In 2014, a law passed by Congress expropriated the coffeehouse and mandated its restoration; restoration efforts began in 2016 and are, as of 2022, nearing completion

== History ==
Cayetano Brenna, a famous confectioner, commissioned Italian architect Francisco Gianotti in 1915 to design the building that would house a café on its ground floor. The café itself opened on July 9, 1916, and when completed in 1917 the building became one of the tallest in the city with a corner turret rising 65 metres (213 ft). Illuminated from the inside with electric lighting, the turret featured stained glass windows and decorative windmill sails. El Molino and Galería Güemes were two of Gianotti's greatest works and represent important examples of Art Nouveau style architecture in Buenos Aires.

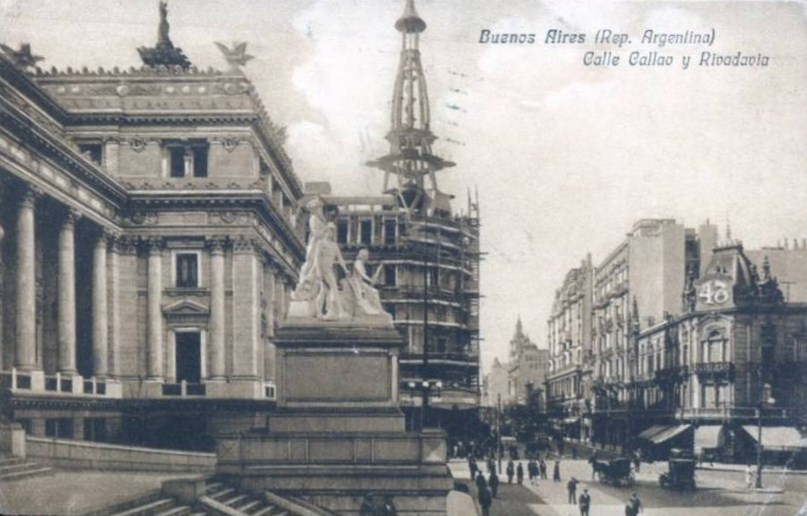
Under construction in 1915

Cayetano Brenna died in 1938 and Renato Varesse took over the business until 1950, when Antonio Armentano appeared, who in turn sold the goodwill in 1978. The new owners cause the bankruptcy of the confectionery, which happens to be acquired by Brenna's grandchildren, who introduce a series of improvements to adapt it to the new times.

Over the years El Molino became a favourite meeting place for local cultural, business, and political figures. The café was closed on 23 February 1997 and, neglected by its owners and abandoned in general, it slowly deteriorated until it was evident considerable restoration efforts were needed to salvage the building.

The Confitería del Molino was declared a National Historic Monument in 1997. Congress approved its purchase by the Argentine Government in a bill passed unanimously on November 12, 2014. Plans include the restoration of the building and reopening of the namesake café, as well as the creation of a museum of early 20th century life in Buenos Aires. Officially, the building will be an annex of the Argentine Congress serving numerous functions and administered through a bicameral commission (the Special Bicameral Administrative Commission on the "Edificio del Molino"; Law 27.009), though the coffee shop itself is to be operated by the private sector.

== Illustrious visitors ==
- Alfredo Palacios
- Tito Schipa
- Beniamino Gigli
- Lily Pons
- Leopoldo Lugones
- Amado Nervo
- José Ingenieros
- Oliverio Girondo
- Roberto Arlt
- Ramón Gómez de la Serna
- Lisandro de la Torre
- Eva Perón
- Niní Marshall
- Libertad Lamarque
- Madonna
- Carlos Gardel
- Adolfo Bioy Casares
- Isser Harel
- Rafi Eitan

== In popular culture ==
- In 1996, American entertainer Madonna recorded the videoclip of her cover of Love Don't Live Here Anymore in the main hall of the coffeehouse.
- The 1996 movie Autumn Sun, has scenes filmed in the place.

== Gallery ==
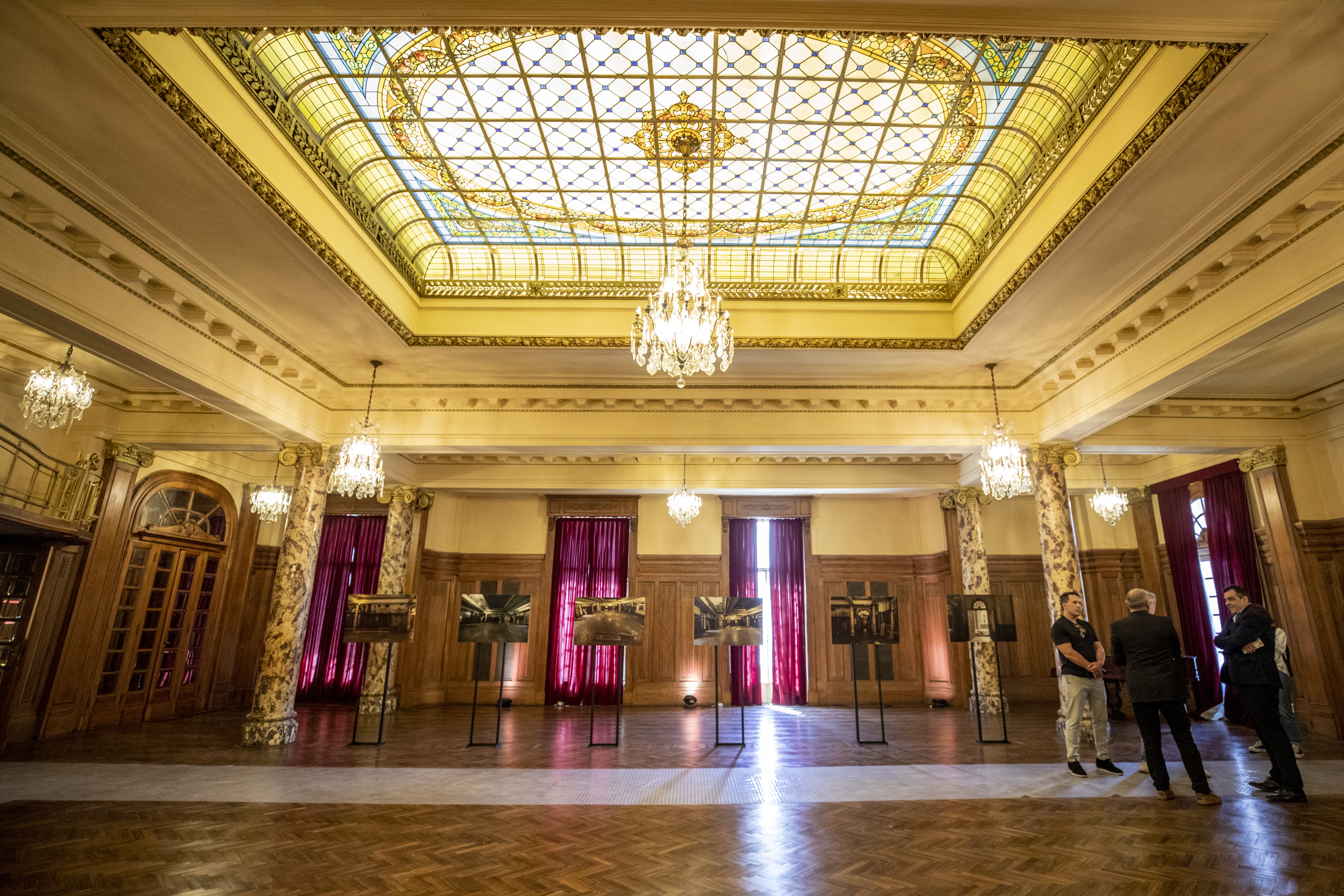
Events hall

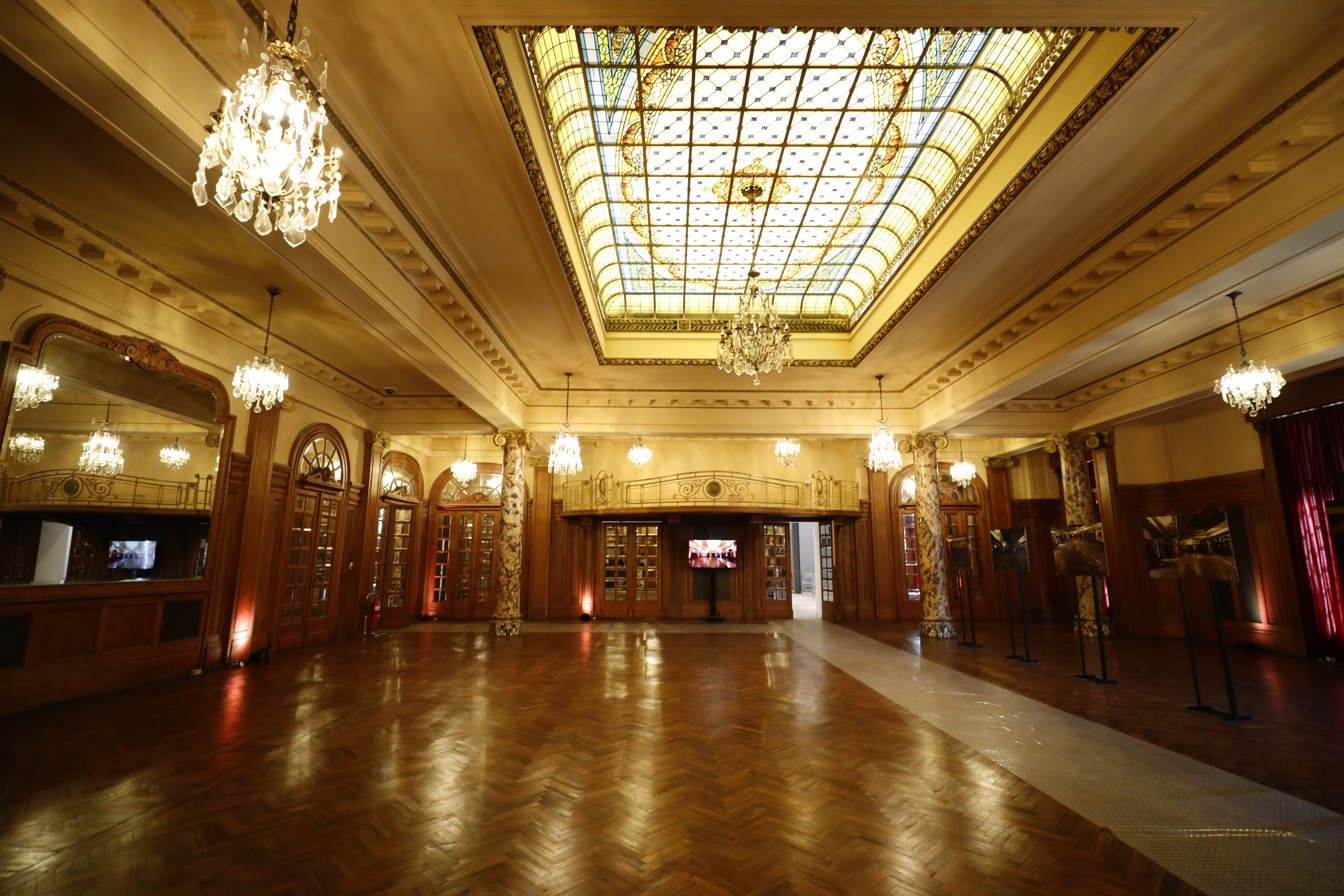
Events hall

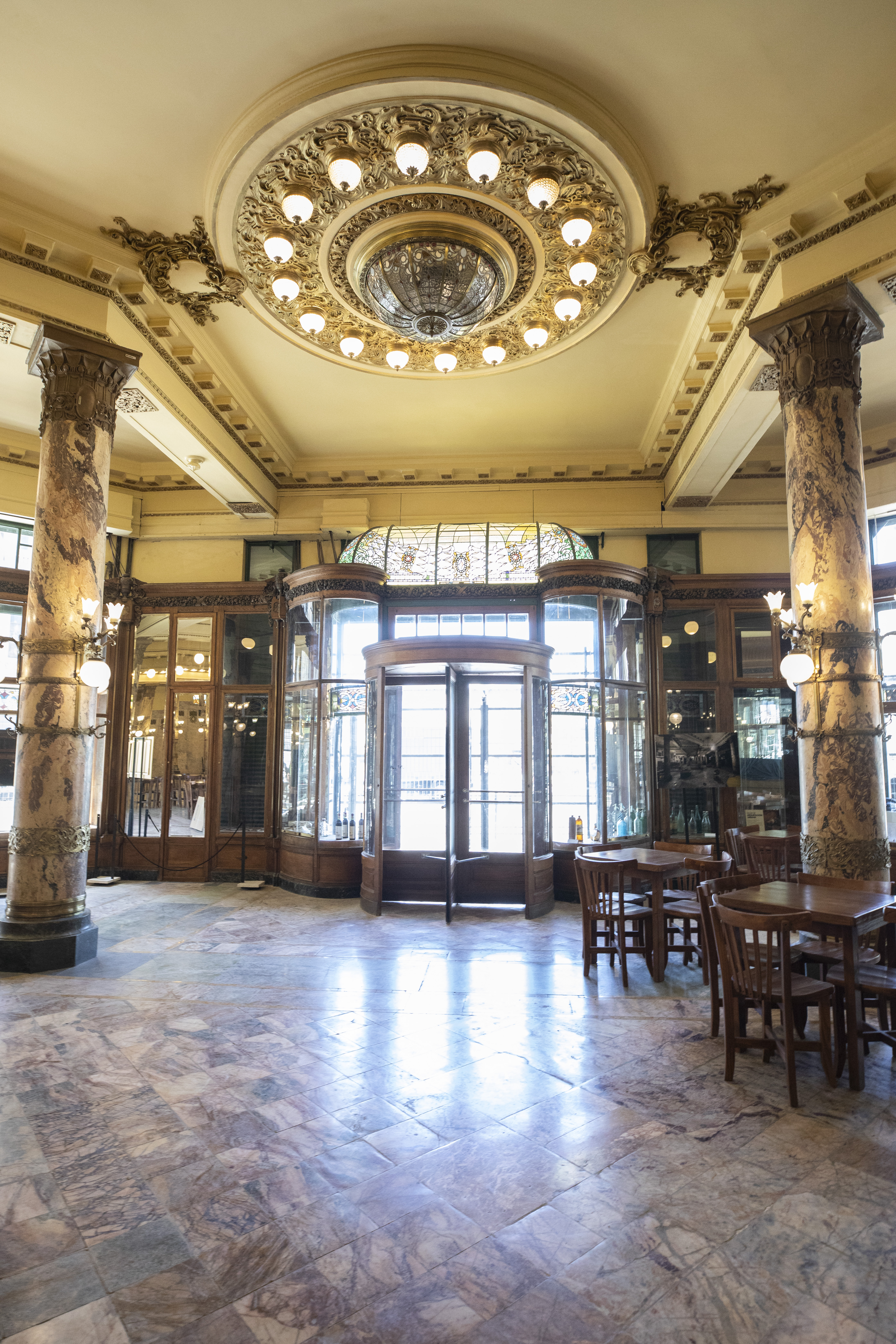
Restaurant

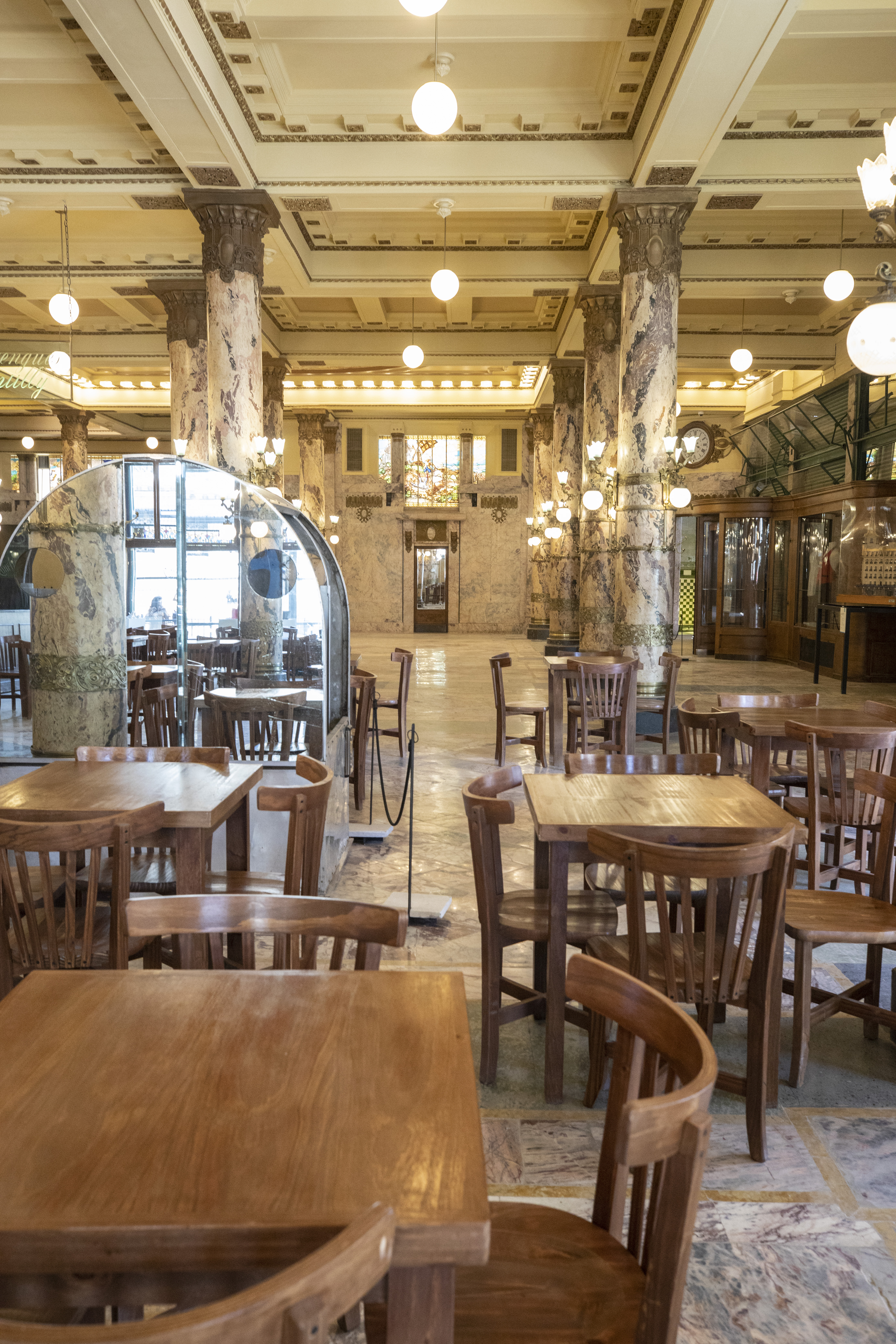
Restaurant

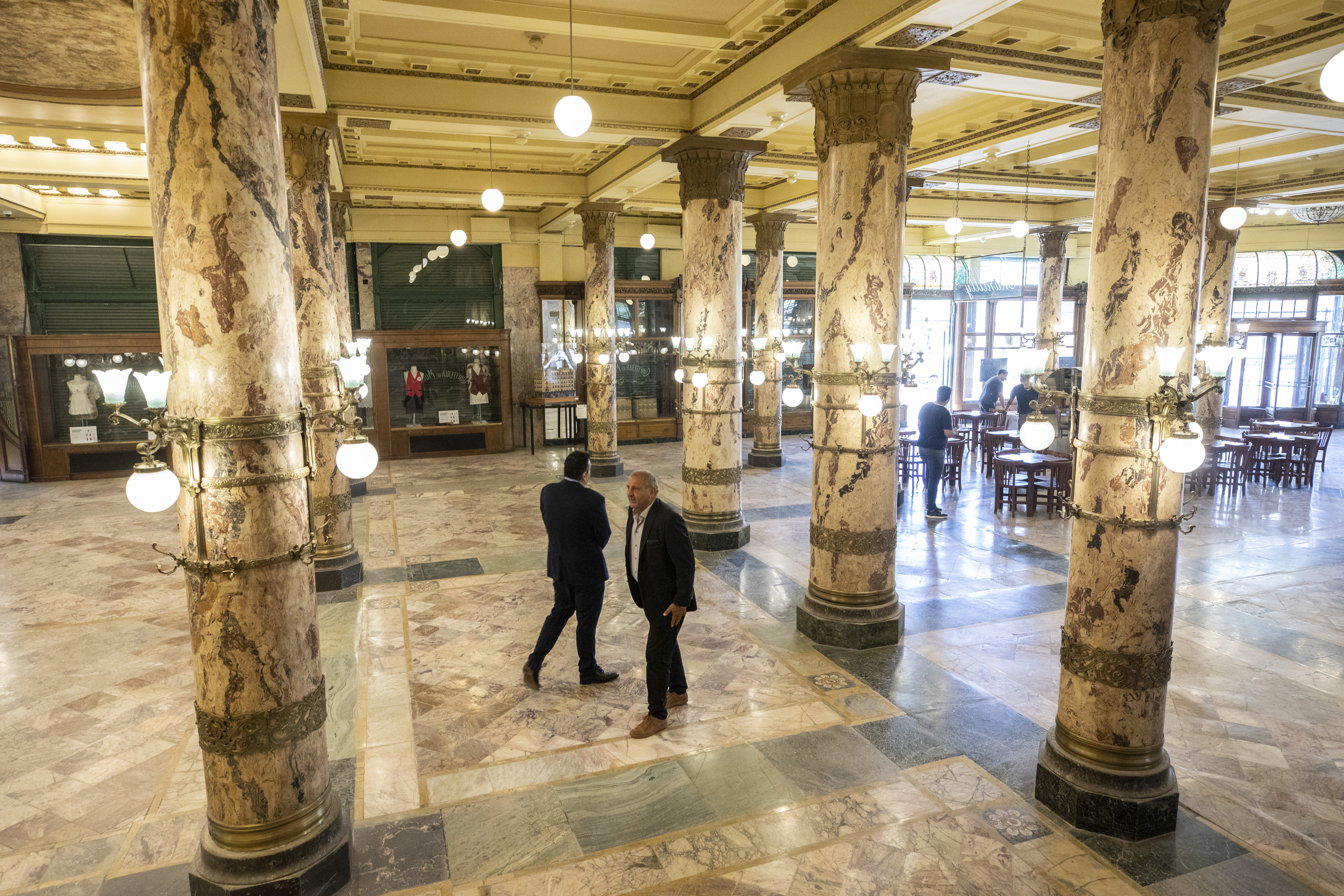
Restaurant

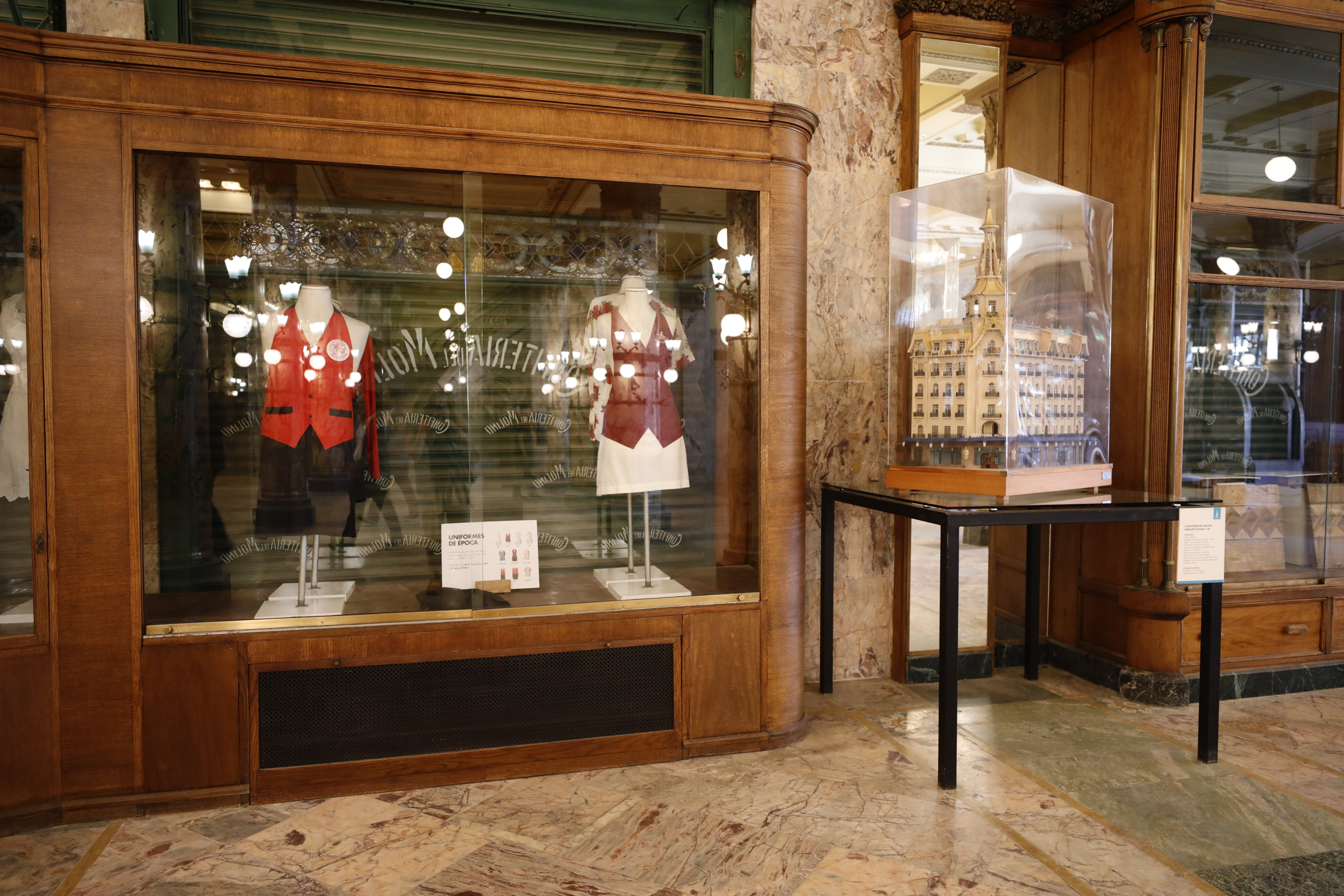
Uniforms exhibited

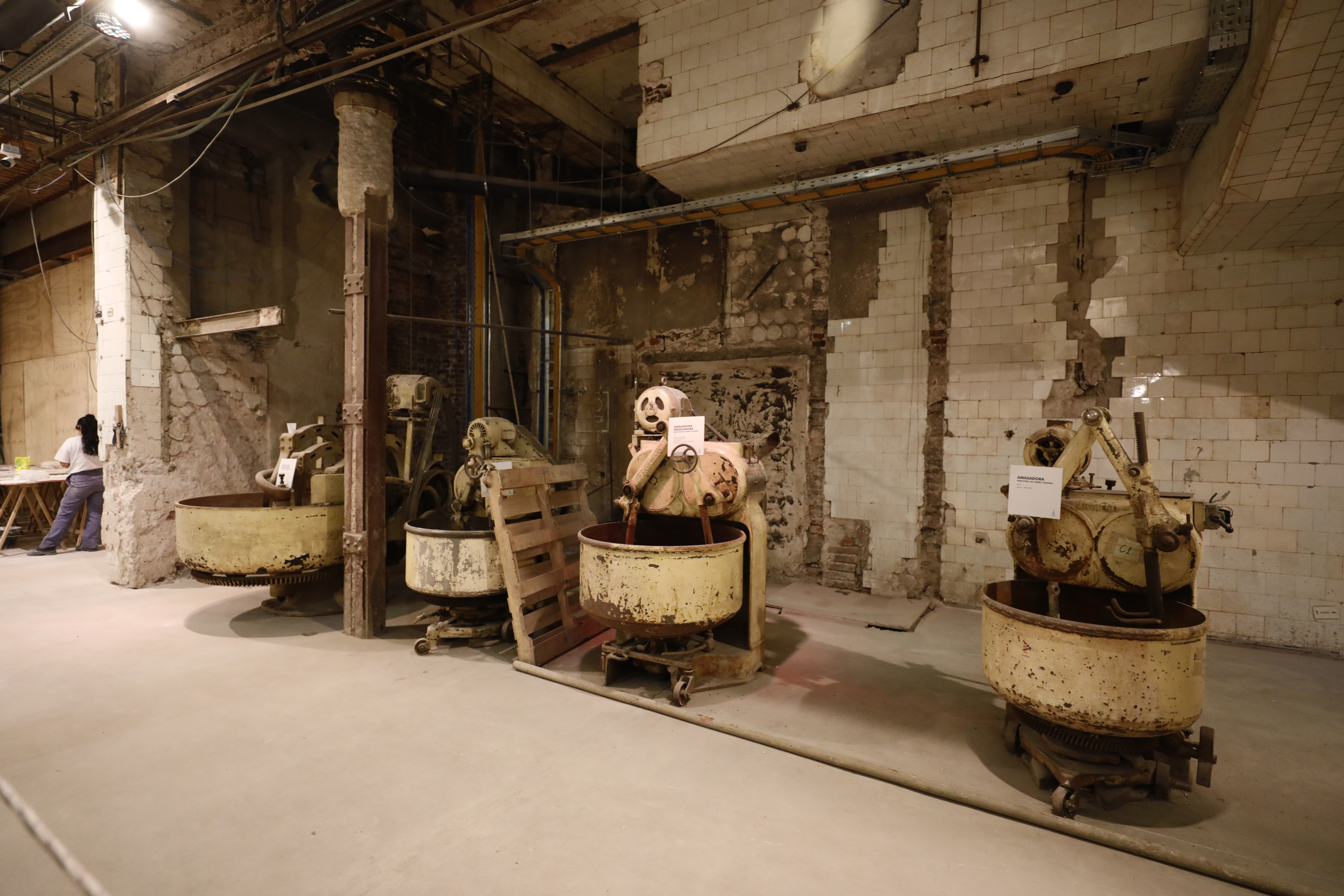
Preserved machines

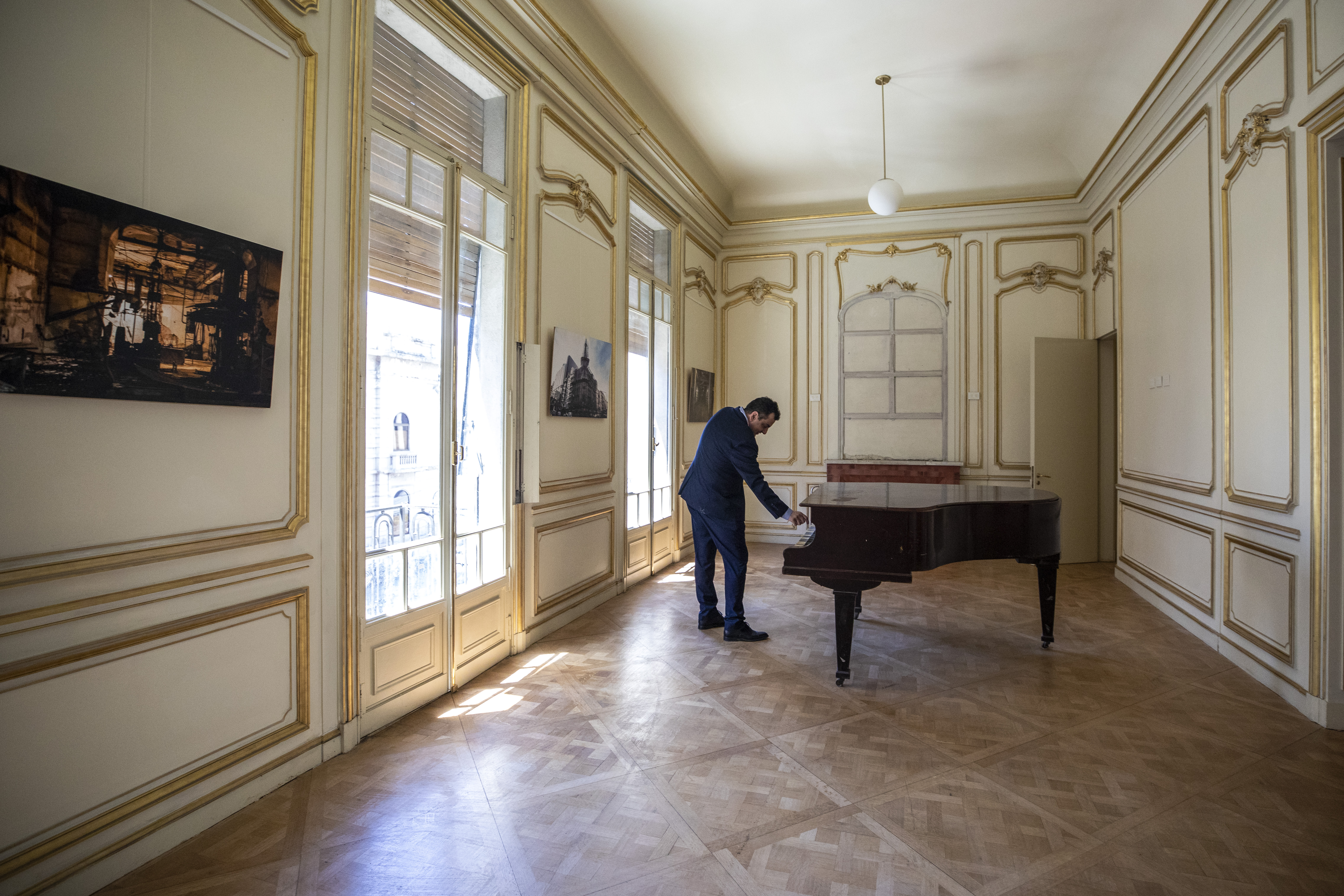
Music hall

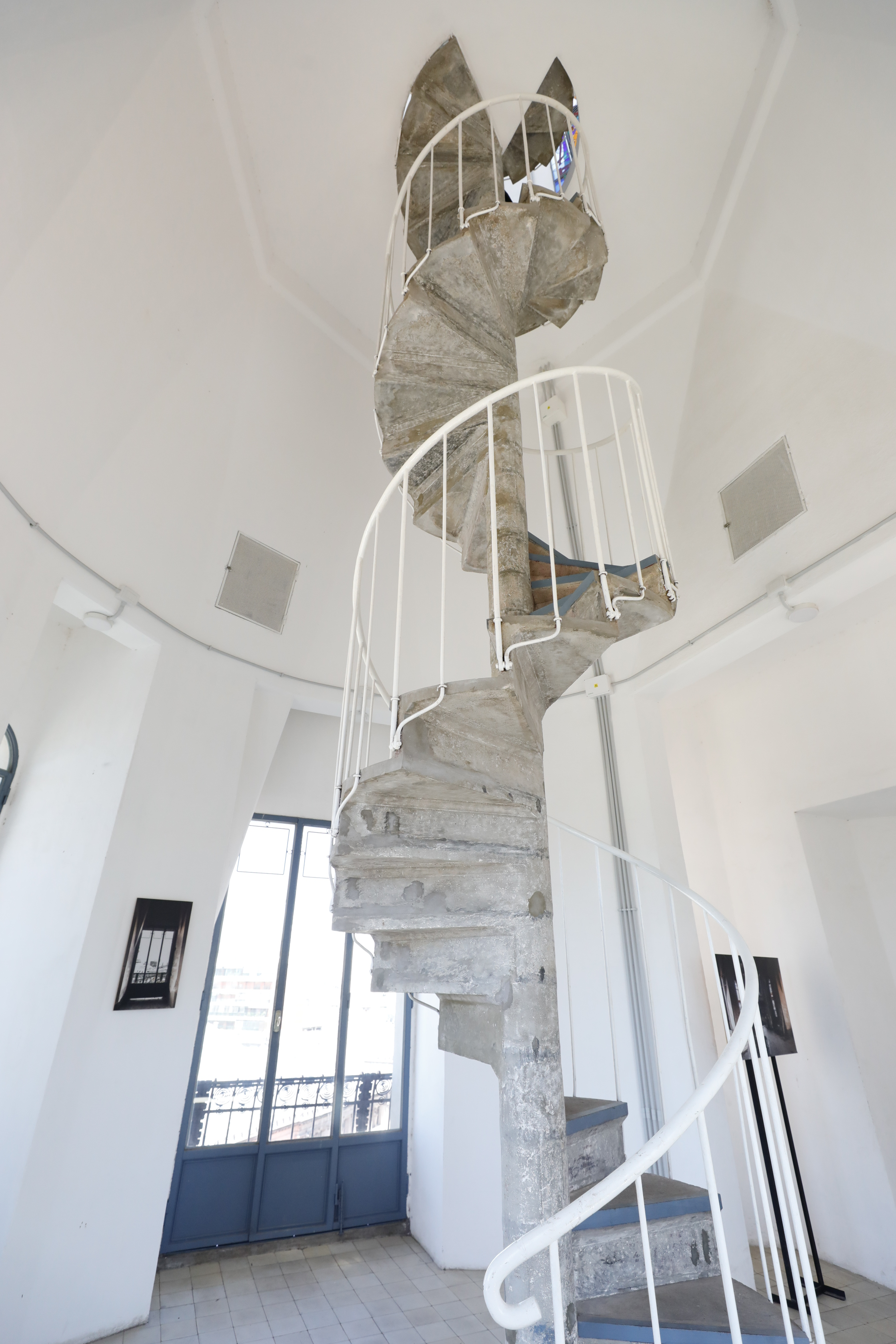
Interior steps

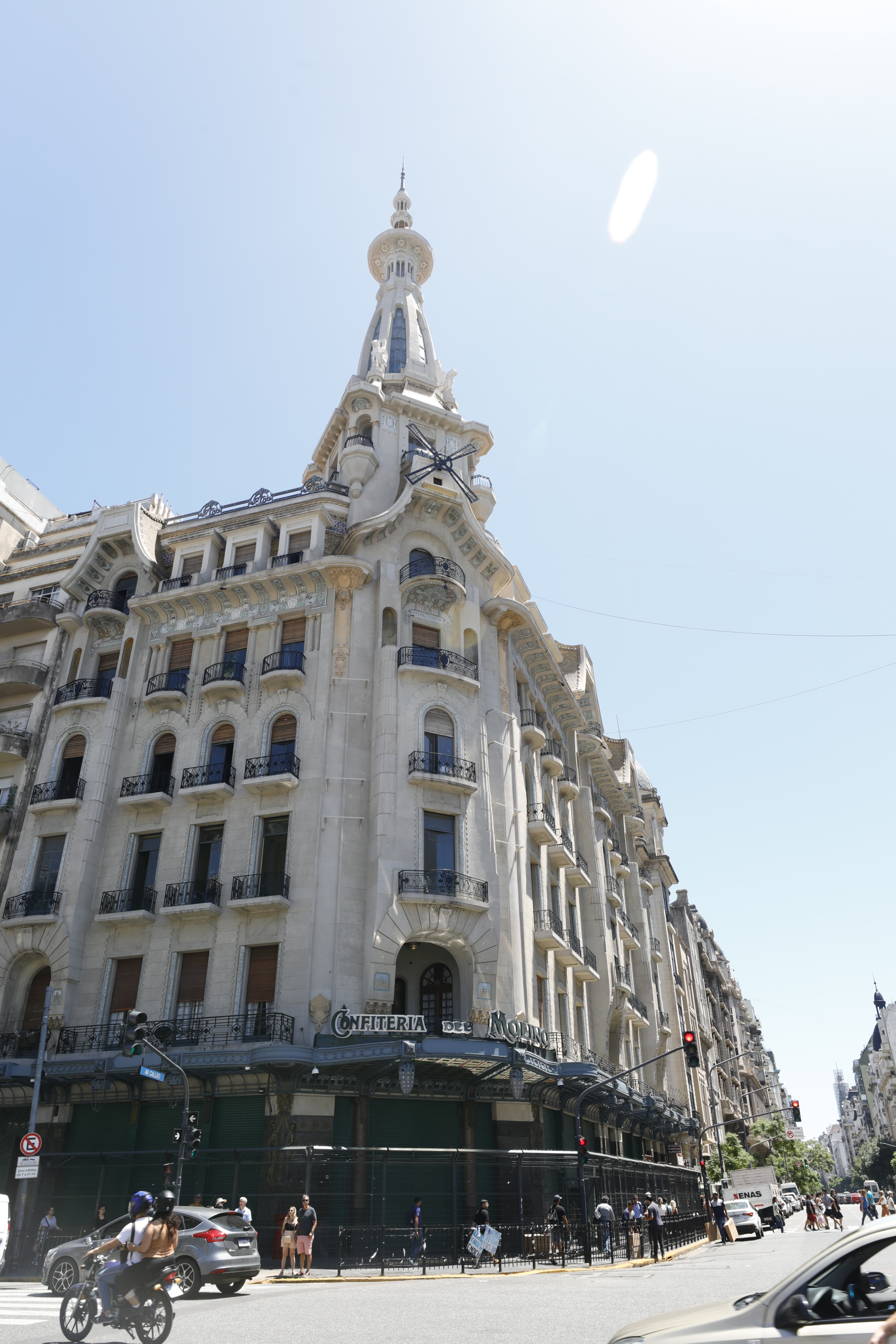
Rivadavia Avenue façade

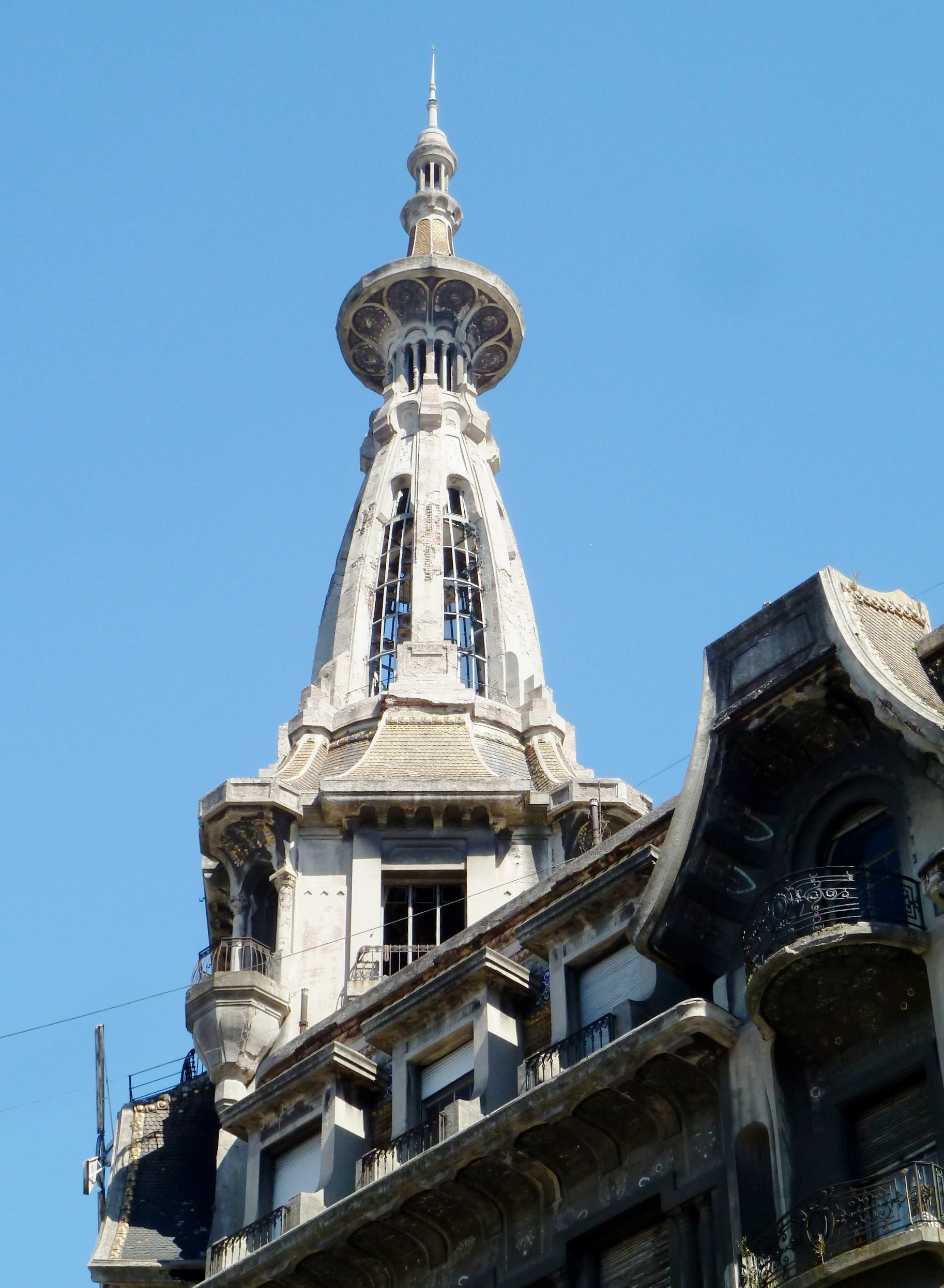
Tower

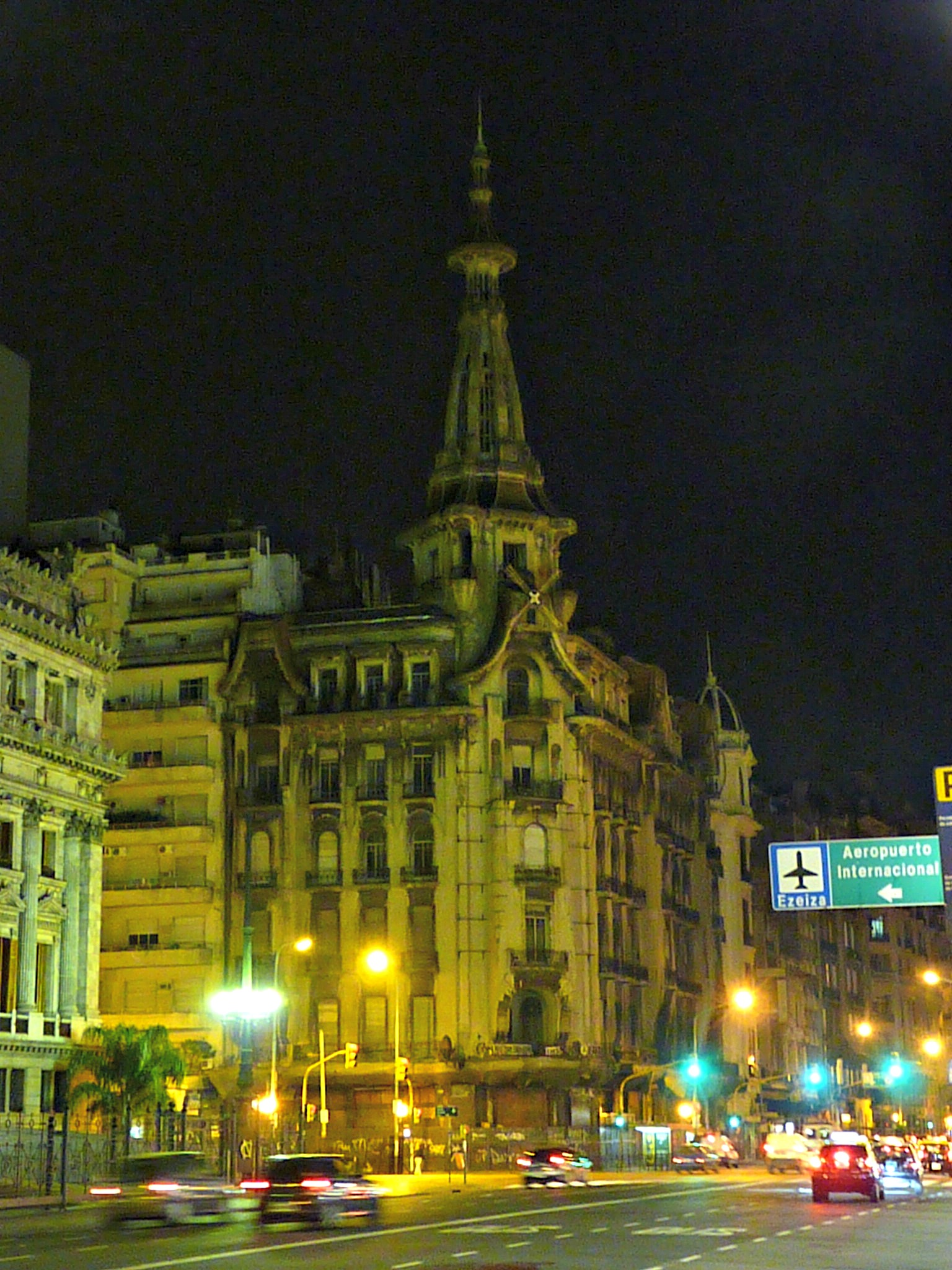
The building at night

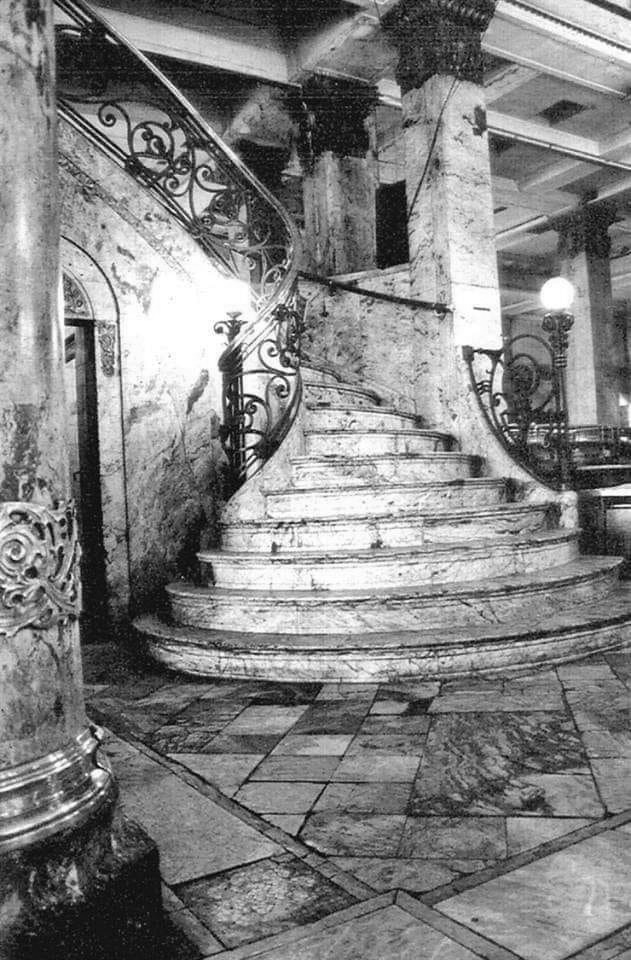
Interiors and steps (1920s)

== Bibliography ==
- Mimi Böhm, Buenos Aires, Art Nouveau, Ediciones Xavier Verstraeten, Buenos Aires, 2005.
- Monumentos Históricos Nacionales y Bienes Declarados de la República Argentina, Comisión Nacional de Museos y de Monumentos y Lugares Históricos de la República Argentina, Edición 2008.
