= Plaza Miserere =

Square in Buenos Aires, Argentina

Coordinates: 34°36′35″S 58°24′26.8″W

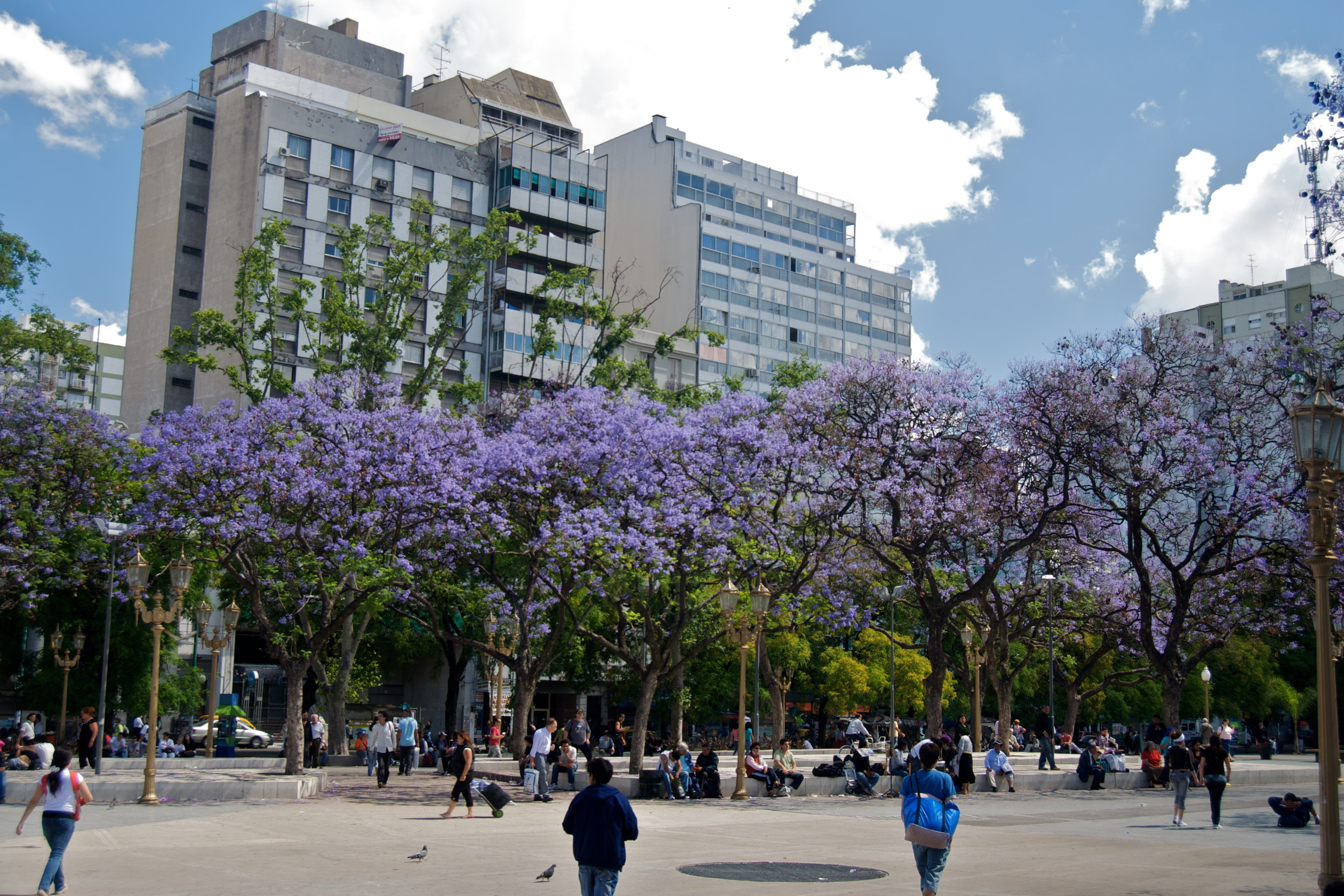
Plaza Miserere

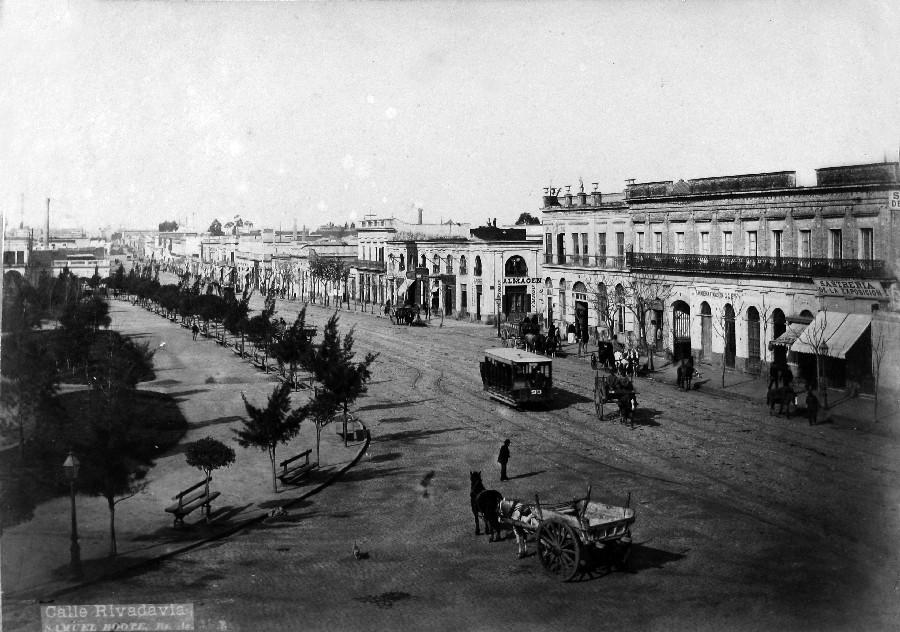
View of Plaza Miserere around 1890

Plaza Miserere is one of the main plazas (squares) of Buenos Aires, Argentina. It is located alongside the Once de Septiembre Station of the Ferrocarril Domingo Faustino Sarmiento (Sarmiento railroad) in the heart of the Balvanera neighborhood.

== History ==
The square lies on the former site of a mansion known as the Quinta de Miserere. Around 1814, it was known as Mataderos de Miserere (Slaughterhouses of Miserere), Hueco de los corrales (Hole of the corrals) in 1817, and Mercado del Oeste (Western Market) by 1850. It was also known as Mercado (or Plaza) 11 de septiembre (11 September Market or plaza); the name Plaza Miserere dates from 1947.

The plaza was the site of skirmishes during the British invasions of 1806. It was the site of the defeat of the troops under Santiago de Liniers during the second invasion of 1807.

The market functioned until 1882, when Mayor Torcuato de Alvear began the demarcation of the plaza. In 1882 it was used as the site for the South American Continental Exhibition. The neighboring Once Terminal was inaugurated in 1898. The square underwent an important remodel in 1913, when a Line A station for the Buenos Aires Metro was built underneath. This station was officially named after the square above it, but like the square itself became more popularly known as Plaza Once.

The square's current design is from 1923. The mausoleum of Bernardino Rivadavia, the first Constitutional President of Argentina, was created by sculptor Rogelio Yrurtia and added in 1932, where his ashes remain despite his wish that they not stay in Argentina.

== Pictures ==
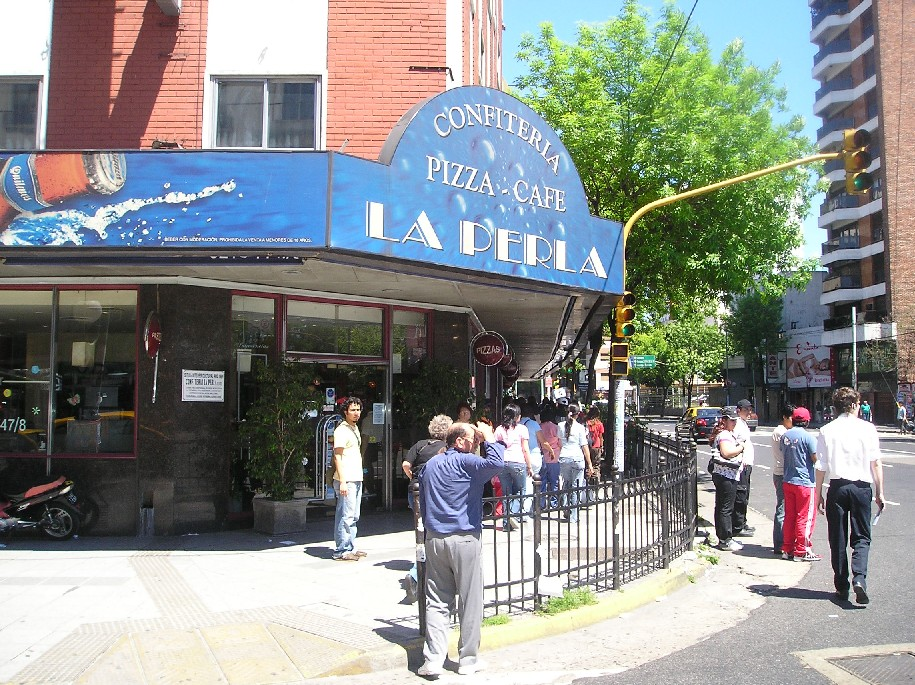
Café La Perla del Once, facing Plaza Miserere

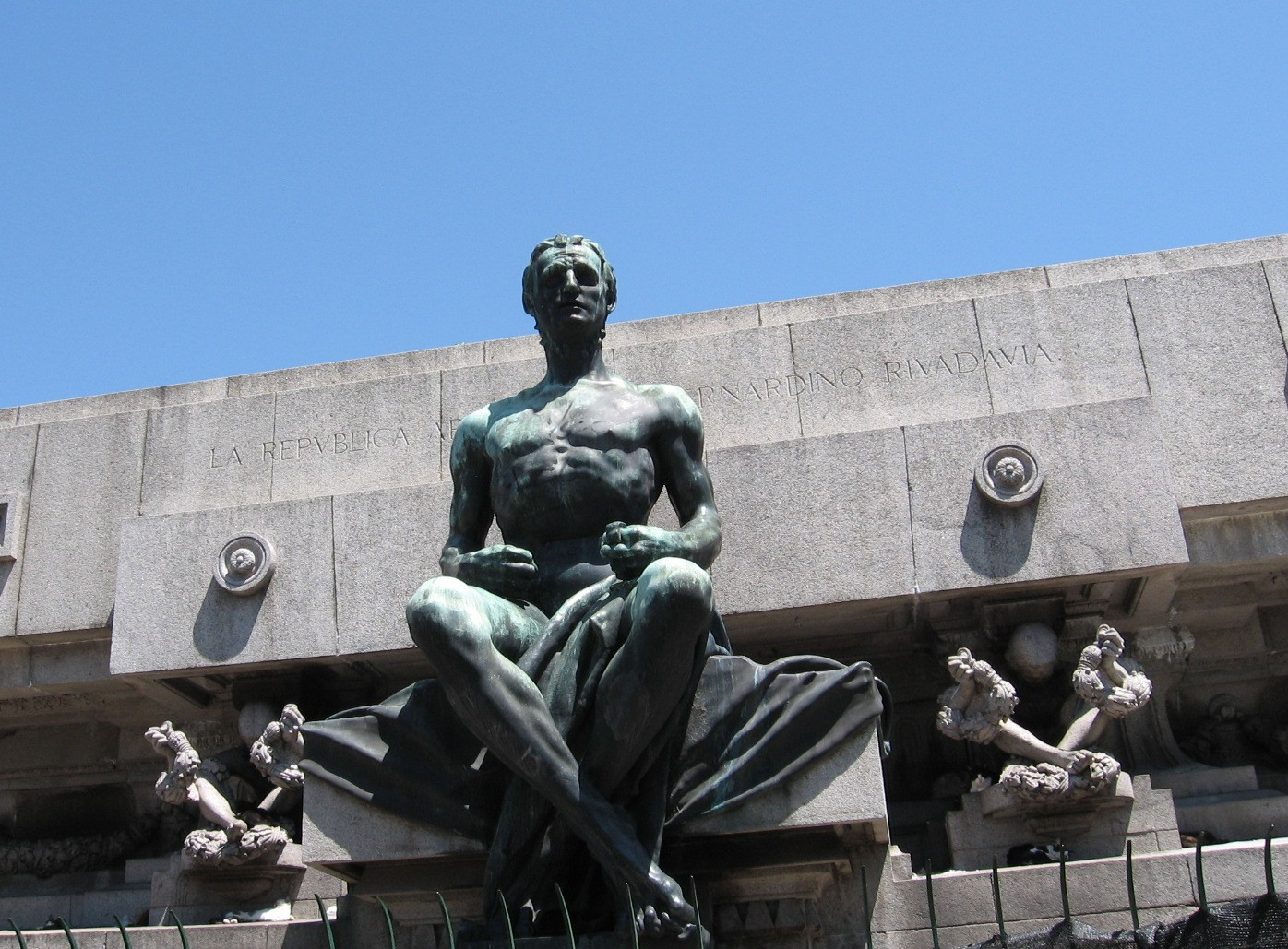
Bernardino Rivadavia Mausoleum

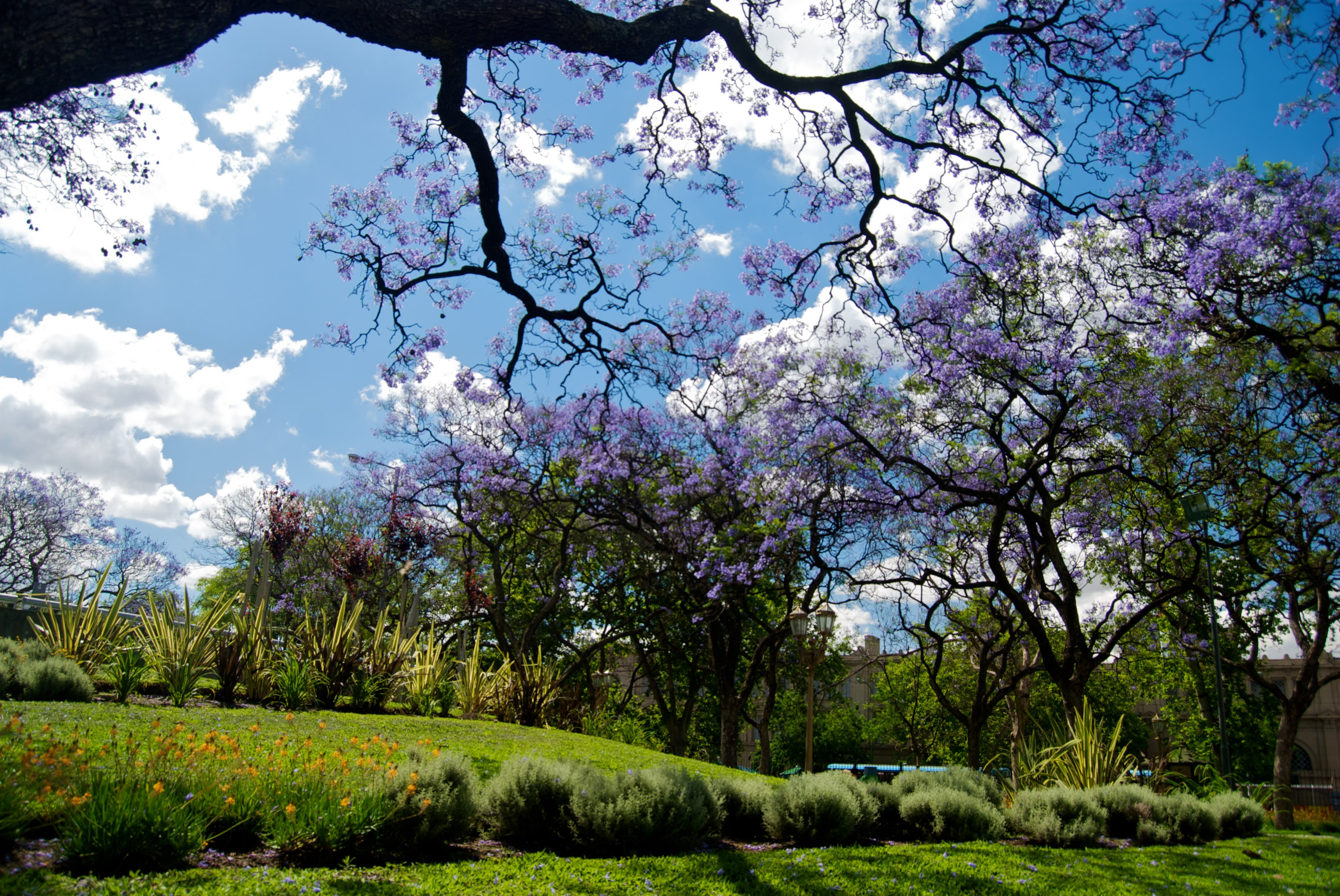
Gardens
