= Balvanera =

- Neighborhood
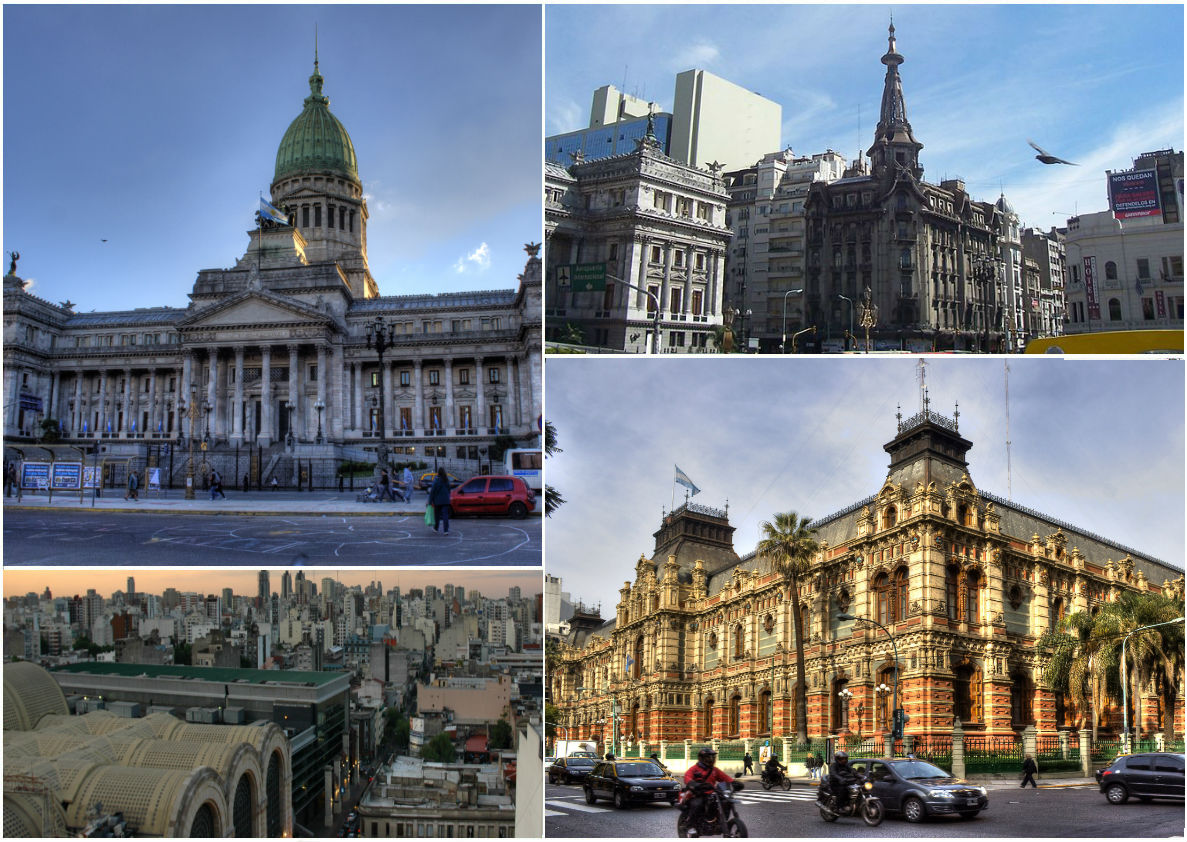
- Clockwise from top: the Argentine National Congress Palace, Confitería del Molino, the Abasto Shopping and Palacio de Aguas Corrientes.

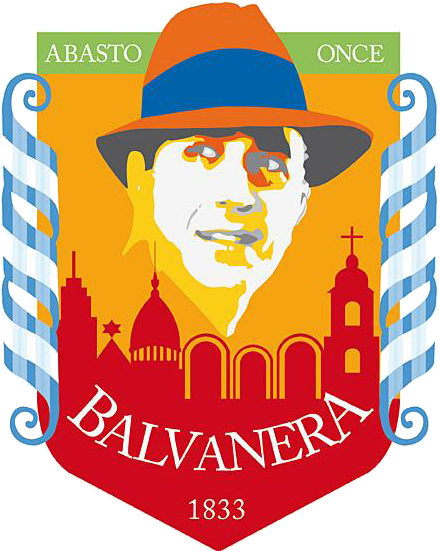
- Emblem
- Interactive map of Balvanera
- Country: Argentina
- Autonomous City: Buenos Aires
- Comuna: C3
- Important sites: Plaza Miserere; National Congress; UBA's Economics Faculty

Area
  - Total: 4.4 km^{2} (1.7 sq mi)

Population (2001)
  - Total: 152,198
  - Density: 35,000/km^{2} (90,000/sq mi)
- Time zone: UTC-3 (ART)
- The neighbourhood is often referred to as Once

Balvanera is a neighborhood, or in Spanish: a "barrio", of Buenos Aires, Argentina.

== Origin of name and alternative names ==
The official name, Balvanera, is the name of the parroquia (parish) centered around the church of Nuestra Señora de Balvanera, erected in 1831.

The area around Corrientes avenue is known as Once after Plaza Once de Septiembre, the alternative name of Plaza Miserere (the square in which president Bernardino Rivadavia's mausoleum is located).

The south-eastern part of Balvanera is often called Congreso, as it contains the Congress building and the neighboring Plaza del Congreso (Congressional Plaza).

The north-western part of Balvanera is referred to as Abasto after the landmark Abasto market (now a shopping mall; see below).

== History and communities ==
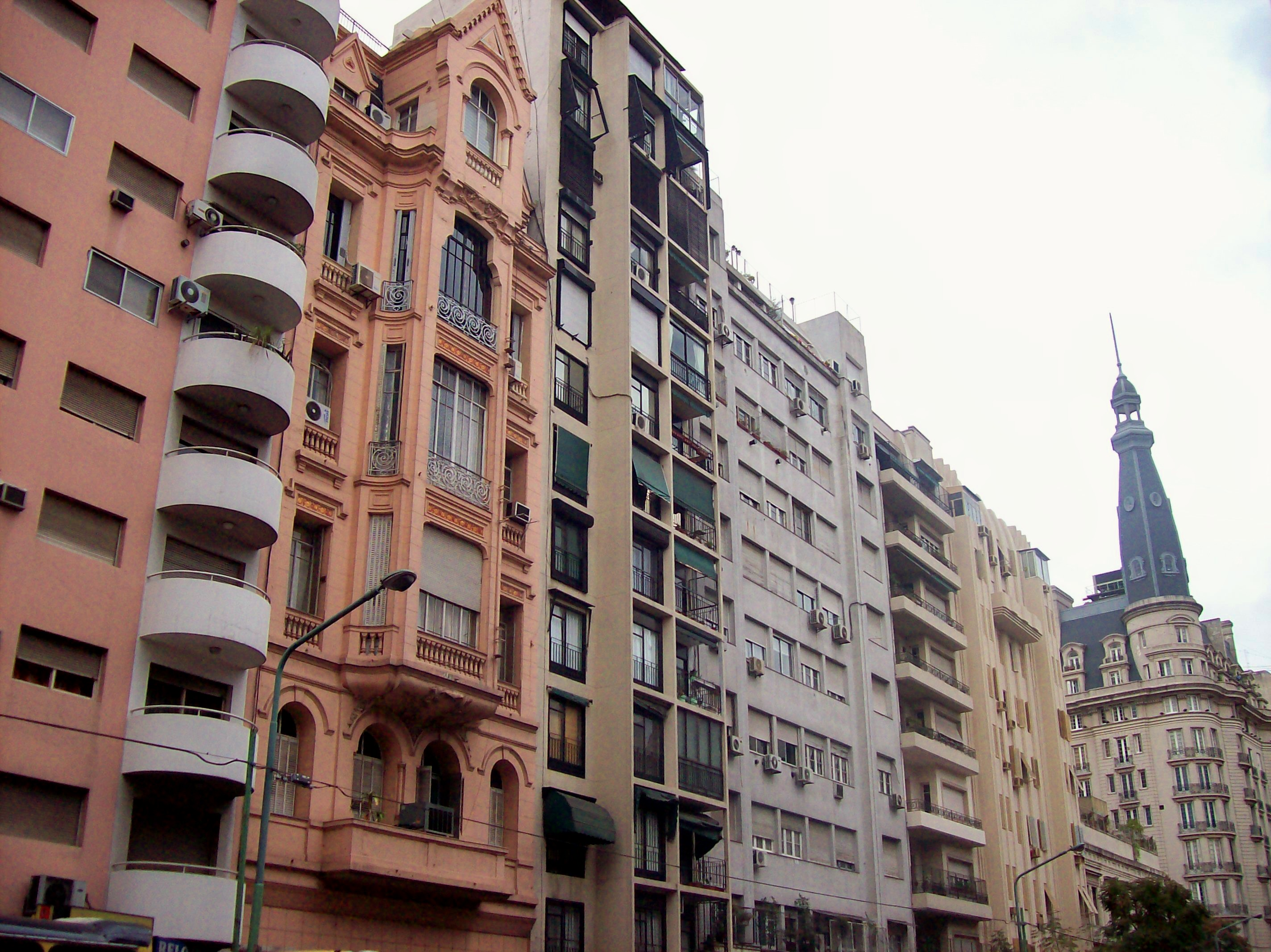
Eclectic architecture along Callao Avenue.

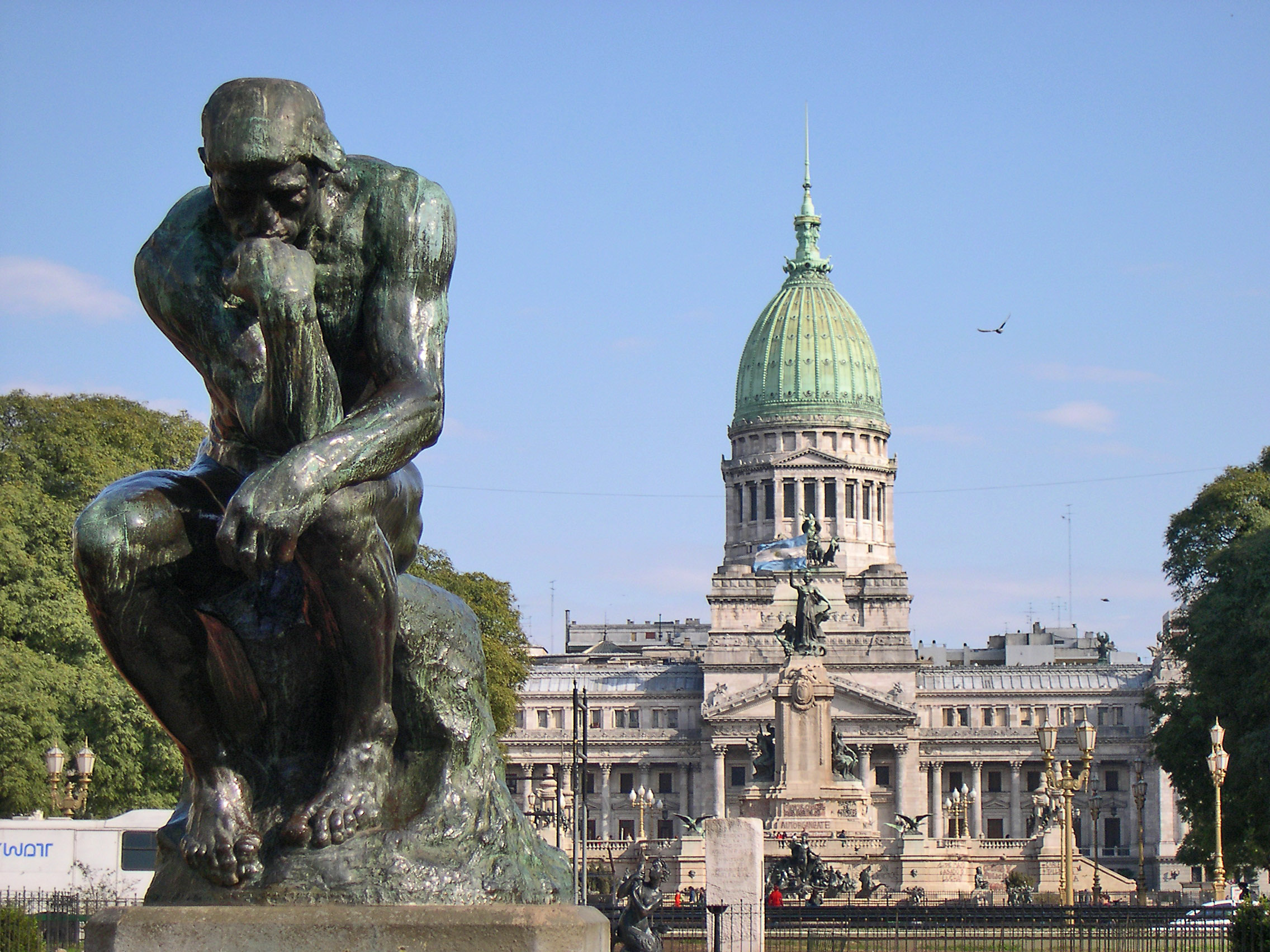
The Argentine Congress and Auguste Rodin's Thinker, one of the few surviving originals the sculptor made.

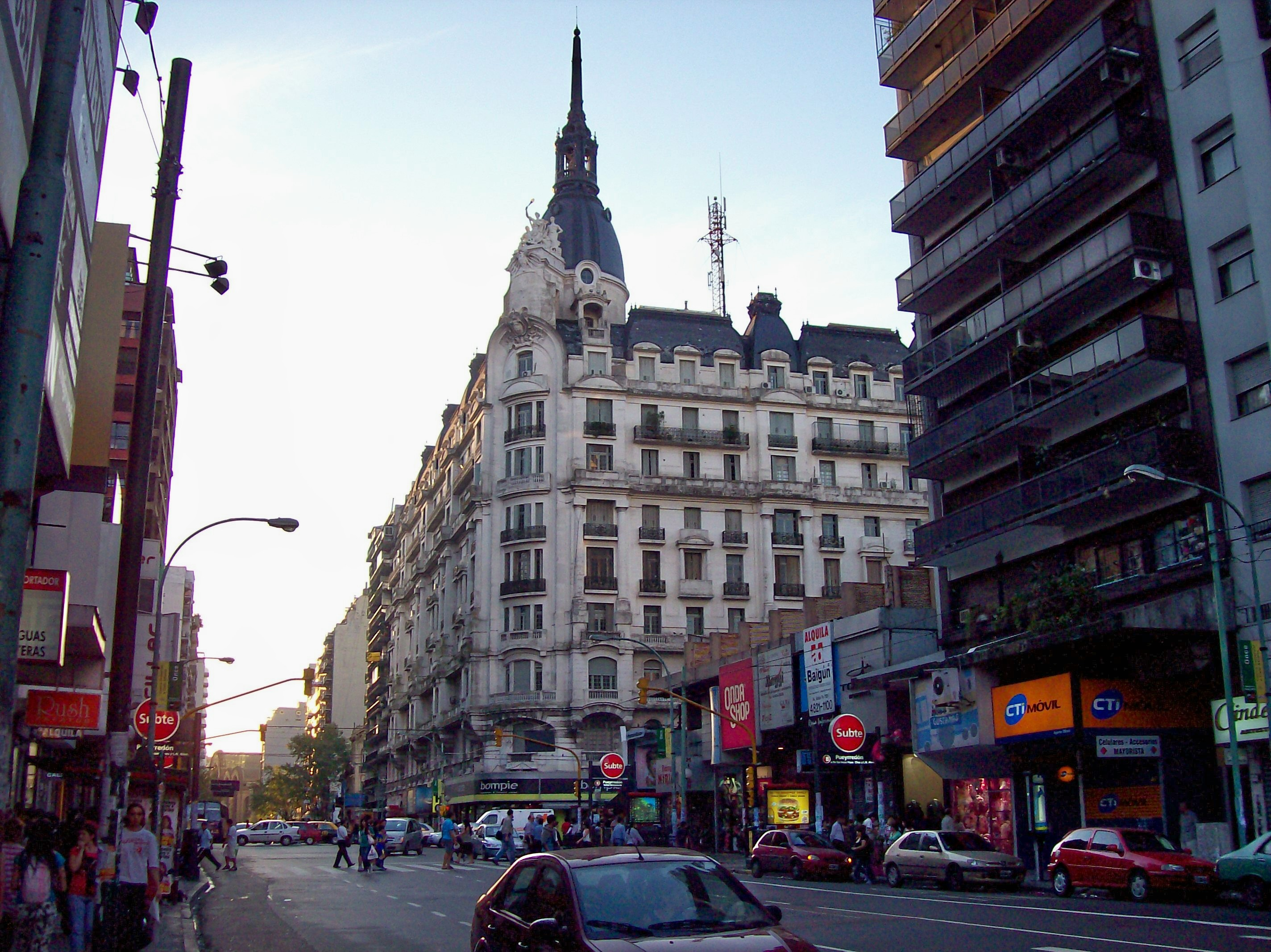
French Academy architecture lost among its modern surroundings, Corrientes and Pueyrredón Avenues.

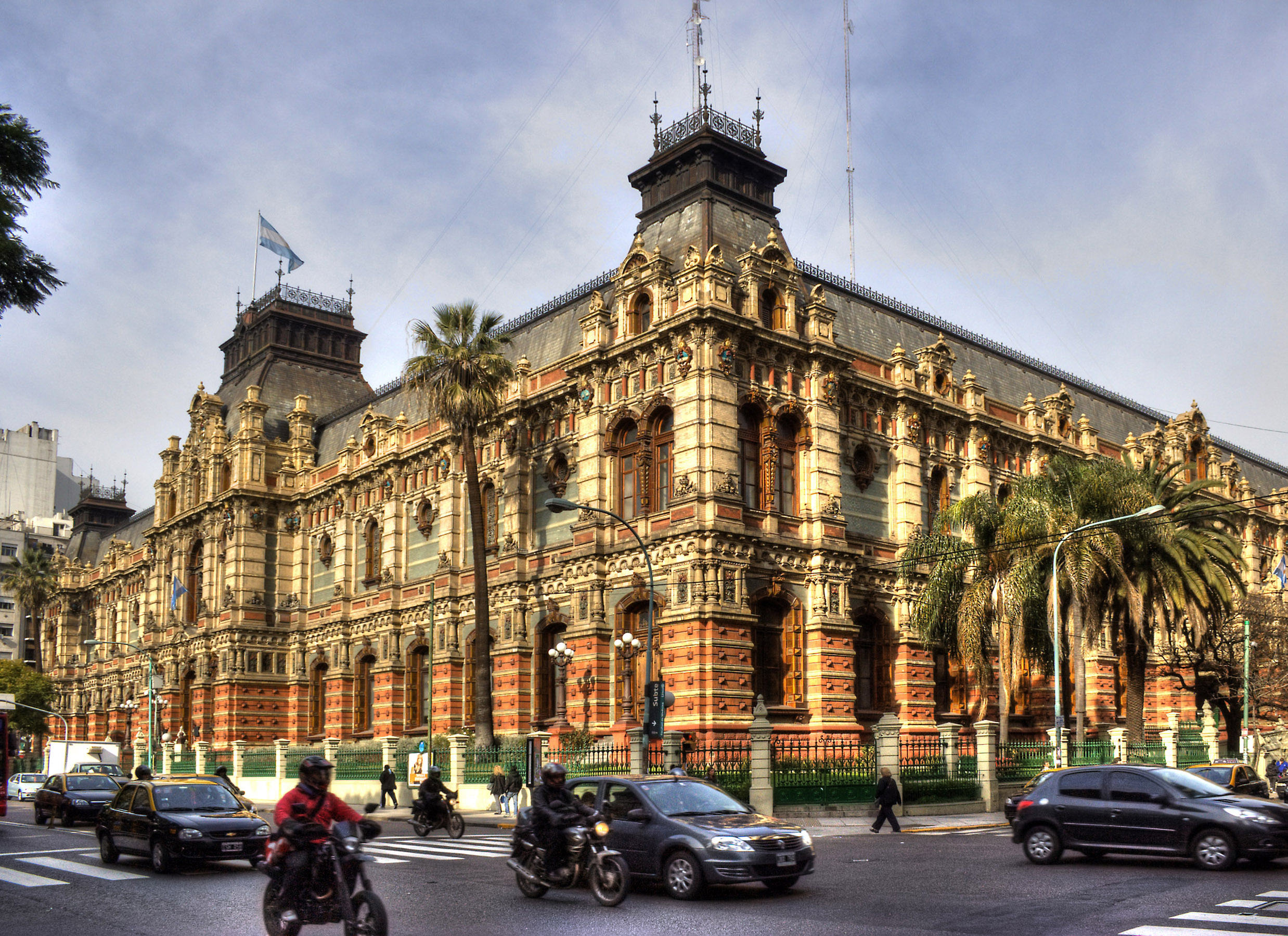
Palacio de Aguas Corrientes, Córdoba Avenue.

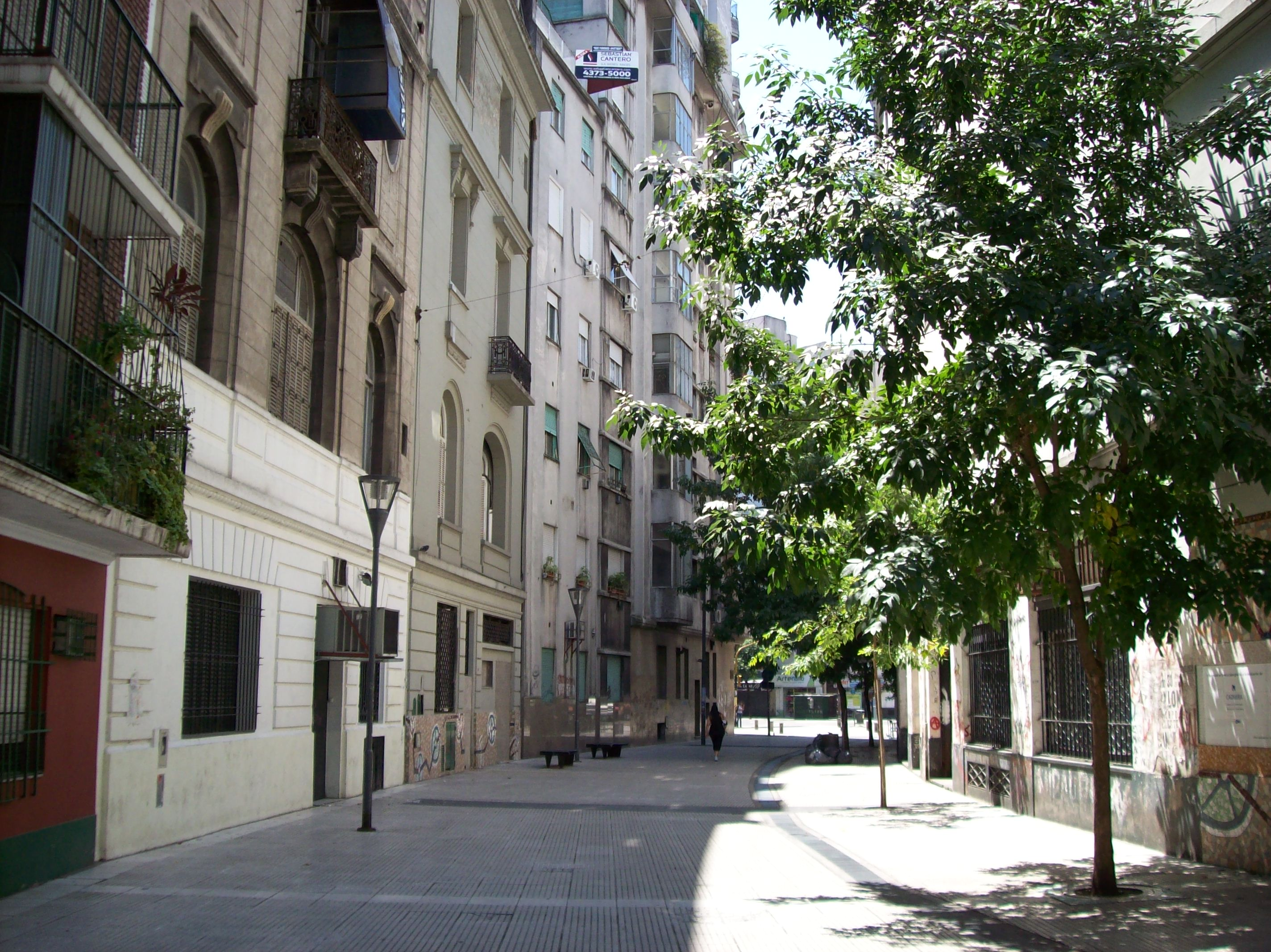
Bohemian Santos Discépolo Way.

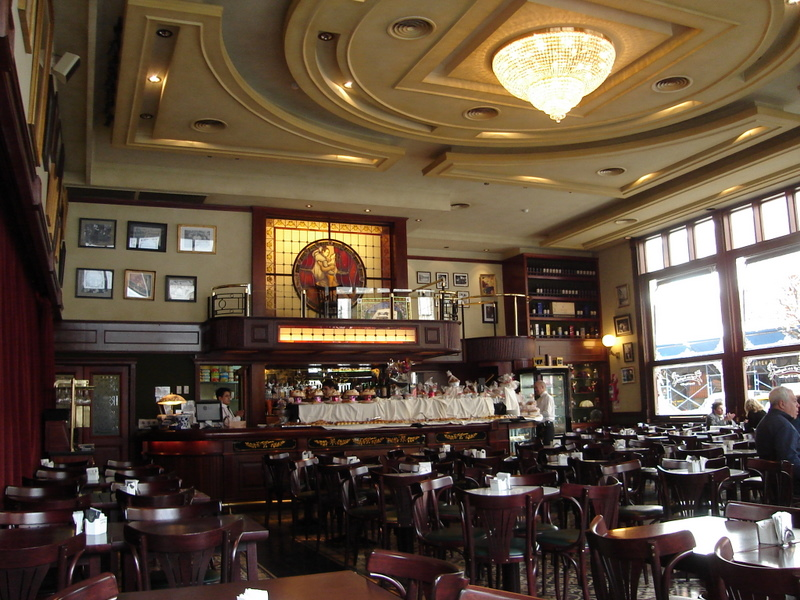
Café de los Angelitos, long a meeting point for musical and literary talent.

Towards the middle of the 18th century the lands of the current Balvanera belonged to Antonio González Varela, a Spaniard known by the nickname of Miserere. In 1799, the priest Damián Pérez received a plot of land were the Parish Nuestra Señora de Balvanera was built years later.

During the British invasions of the River Plate, Balvanera was a battleground between the Spanish troops under Santiago de Liniers and the English, commanded by William Beresford. The Battle of Miserere, occurred during the second invasion, took place in the current Miserere square on July 2, 1807.

In 1833 the Cemetery of the Dissidents was installed in Balvanera, a resting place for Protestants of English, German and US-American origin. The Protestant cemetery closed in 1892, the bodies that were buried there were transferred to the British Cemetery of Chacarita. This cemetery, also known as the "Cementerio de la Victoria", was located in the current Plaza Primero de Mayo, and among its illustrious residents was Elizabeth Chitty Curling de Brown (wife of William Brown), whose tomb was never found.

Until the 1860s, Balvanera was considered an outskirt of Buenos Aires proper. In 1836, a census set its population at 3,635. Most inhabitants lived in quintas (small estates), and the zone was known as las quintas. The Camino Real (now Rivadavia) was the main road from the city to the west.

In the late 19th century, Balvanera had a strong political tradition, identifying first with Adolfo Alsina and then with UCR leaders Leandro Alem and Hipólito Yrigoyen.

By 1900, Balvanera was associated mostly with violently contested elections—and with the brothels in the Junín y Lavalle area where, according to Borges, the tango dance acquired its notorious erotic overtones. Natural growth and railroad development eventually assimilated the neighbourhood into the city.

During the 1910s and 1920s, the area around Corrientes avenue became the center of Buenos Aires's Jewish community and the hub of the garment trade, which in turn attracted segments of the Arab and Armenian communities.

A number of Jewish institutions are located in Balvanera, including the Gran Templo Paso and the AMIA community center (bombed on July 18, 1994, in the bloodiest terror attack ever on Argentine soil).

The southern part of Balvanera is home to some traditional institutions of the Galician community, and features a lively furniture trade along Belgrano avenue.

In the late 1970s, Balvanera became a favored location for electronics import shops which co-exist with the more traditional fabrics and garment shops. Newly arrived Korean and Chinese immigrants have become a strong presence in several fields of commerce (see Asian-Argentines).

== Geography ==
Balvanera is located to the west of downtown Buenos Aires (el centro, which comprises San Nicolás and Montserrat). The northern neighborhood of Recoleta (part of the area known as Barrio Norte) is located north of Balvanera, crossing Córdoba avenue.

Most dwellers of Balvanera live in apartment buildings erected on small lots. Population density is very high, and the amount of green space is deemed insufficient. The meager green space of Plaza Miserere is usually taken up by illegal peddlers, people queuing for their bus, and preachers of all stripes.

As in most of Buenos Aires, the streets are laid out in a checkboard pattern. Most streets and avenues are one-way.

The main streets of Balvanera are arguably Rivadavia, which crosses the entire city from East to West (North-South streets change their name when crossing Rivadavia), and Corrientes, which is the main thoroughfare of commerce and entertainment in Buenos Aires. The kilómetro cero reference, from which all Argentine routes count the distance to Buenos Aires, is marked by a monolith in Plaza Congreso.

== Highlights ==
=== Notable places ===
The mausoleum of President Rivadavia in Plaza Miserere (Once) used to be covered in graffiti; after a fence was erected around it, its state of repair has improved markedly.

The University complex on the northern edge of Balvanera is home to many faculties of the University of Buenos Aires, including Medicine, Odontology, Economics, Pharmacy, and Social Science, as well as the Clínicas University Hospital. Many private universities have facilities in Balvanera.

The Ramos Mejía general hospital and the Santa Lucía ophthalmology hospital are located in southern Balvanera. Many private health-care institutions are located in Balvanera, mostly around the Faculty of Medicine complex.

Among the architectural features in Balvanera are the neo-classical Congress building and the statue group in neighboring Plaza Congreso. The El Molino coffeehouse is located across the street in a building that has seen several rounds of restoration since its heyday.

The café Los Angelitos in the corner of Rivadavia and Rincón was a meeting point for poets and musicians. It features a relief of angels in its façade , which is one of the landmarks of the barrio. After extensive restorations, it was reopened in 2007 , with plans to offer live tango and become a tourist landmark much like the Tortoni and Ideal cafés.

=== Culture ===
There are many theater and concert halls in Balvanera. The Liceo theater and the Ricardo Rojas cultural center are two of the best-known venues.

For most of the 20th century, it had a Yiddish theater scene. The IFT theater still stands on Boulogne Sur-Mer street, where mural paintings celebrate its history.

Author Macedonio Fernández resided in Balvanera for most of his adult life, and held court, together with Borges, in café La Perla across Miserere Plaza ("Plaza Once"). In the 1960s, the same café was one of the birthplaces of Argentine rock, to the point that the early hit "La balsa" starts with a reference to the washroom of La Perla (in author Tanguito's version).

Many actors (such as Dringue Farías) lived in Balvanera within walking distance of the theater district. In the 1980s, Cafe Einstein was a hub of alternative art, featuring acts such as Sumo.

Much of the Argentine cumbia scene of the 1990s revolved around dance halls near the Once train station.

North of Once station, many former warehouses have been recycled into lofts, offices, or entertainment venues. One of these, the República Cromagnon concert hall (formerly a mini-stadium and dance hall), caught fire on 30 December 2004. 194 people were killed and over 600 were injured. The street outside the venue was closed on and off for several years to serve as a memorial, severely disturbing car and bus traffic.

=== Commerce ===
Currently, more than 25,000 shops are registered in Balvanera, where zoning regulations favor commerce. Many apartment buildings host one or more shops at ground level. The plot of the 2004 movie El abrazo partido revolves around one of Balvanera's many shopping galerías (galleries).

The block of Pueyrredón avenue across Plaza Once features a busy bazaar-like commercial area known as La Recova.

The Abasto shopping mall was the city's wholesale produce market until the late 1980s; its history is closely associated with the life and career of tango singer Carlos Gardel. The area around the market used to contain produce warehouses and low-rent housing for the laborers; with its conversion to a high-end mall, the area experienced a gentrification process from the mid-1990s that was slowed by the 2001 economic crisis; but has resumed at a record pace, since.

== Transportation ==
Being close to the downtown district, Balvanera has access to diverse transportation options.

=== Metro ===
Balvanera has access to five out of the six Subte lines. The downtown area is a short subway trip from anywhere in Balvanera. All intercity train stations are accessible from Balvanera by Subte.

=== Bus ===
Many bus lines go through Balvanera, including the Colectivo 60 line, venerated by locals as el internacional, because its route passes many city landmarks. Other important lines include Colectivo 19, which has been the subject of a composition by Lito Vitale.

Around Plaza Once, numerous long-distance bus depots provide service to major locations in Argentina and neighboring countries. Since its opening in 1980, most long-distance and international bus lines have their terminals at the Retiro bus station, accessible via subte or bus lines such as Colectivo 6.

=== Train ===
The Once de Septiembre train station provides commuter service to the western neighbourhoods and suburbs.

=== Road ===
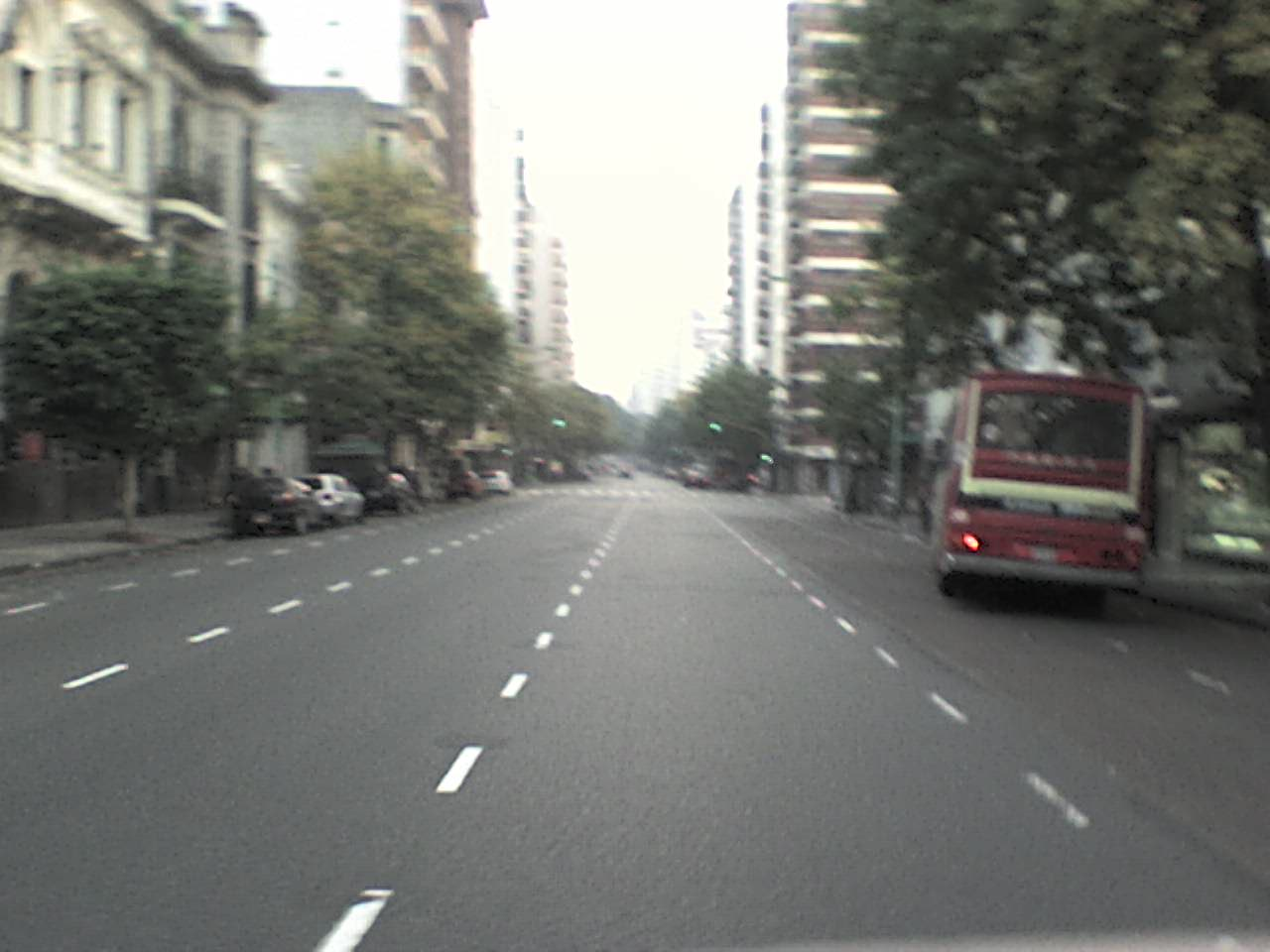
Entre Ríos Avenue, the neighborhood's eastern limit.

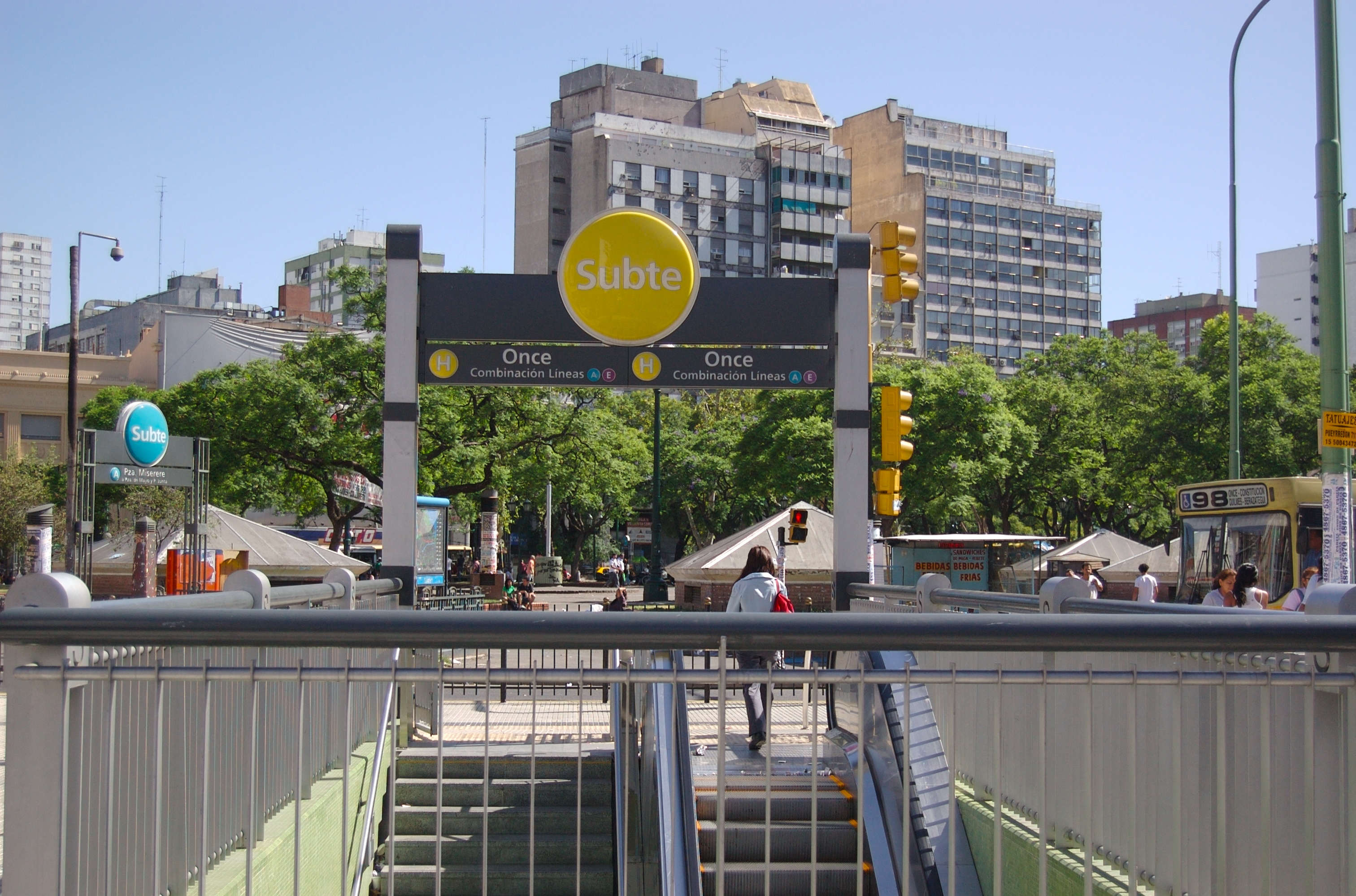
Entrance to the Buenos Aires Underground Line H at Plaza Miserere.

- Westbound: The main avenues are Independencia, Rivadavia and Córdoba.
- Eastbound: The main avenues are Belgrano and Corrientes. Both run all the way to the former shoreline and the Puerto Madero area.
- Northbound: The main avenue is Entre Ríos; north of Rivadavia, its name changes to Callao.
- Southbound: The main avenue is Pueyrredón; south of Rivadavia, its name changes to Jujuy.

During peak hours, most of Balvanera's streets are congested, some of them heavily. Most streets carry bus traffic; the main avenues have special lanes for buses and taxis. Entre Ríos and Jujuy avenues have on-ramps and off-ramps to Autopista 25 de Mayo es:Autopista 25 de Mayo, an elevated toll road that provides rapid access to the western suburbs and to Ezeiza airport.
