= Joaquín Canaveris =

Argentine attorney, politician and military man (1789–1833)

Alcalde del Cuartel No. 4 Monserrat, Buenos Aires
- In office 1816–1817
- Preceded by: León Canícoba
- Succeeded by: Xavier Paz

Alcalde del Cuartel No. 3 of San Nicolás, Buenos Aires
- In office 1821–1822
- Preceded by: Roque del Sar
- Succeeded by: ?

Personal details
- Born: Joaquín José León Canaveris y Esparza; April 9, 1789 Buenos Aires, Argentina
- Died: c. 1833 Buenos Aires, Argentina
- Spouse: María Ana Bayá y Canaveris
- Children: Joaquín Canaveris; Rosa Canaveris; Faustina Canaveris; Norberto Canaveris; Adolfo Canaveris
- Relatives: Baldomero Lamela (relative-in-law); Bartolomé Saravi (relative-in-law); José Francisco de Ugarteche (relative-in-law)
- Occupation: legal politician merchant army
- Profession: attorney
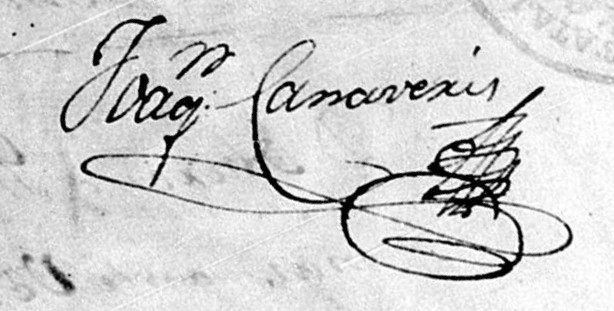
- Signature

Military service
- Allegiance: (Spanish Empire) Spain – until 1810 (Argentina) United Provinces of the River Plate
- Branch/service: Argentine Army
- Years of service: 1806-1810
- Rank: Second Lieutenant
- Commands: Tercio de Vizcaínos
- Battles/wars: British invasions of the Río de la Plata

Joaquín Canaveris (1789 – c. 1833) was an Argentine attorney, merchant, politician and military man, who served as consignee in The Consulate of Buenos Aires. He had an active participation in the defense of Buenos Aires during the English invasions, serving as an Assistant in the battalion of Tercio de Vizcaínos.

He belonged to an old family related to the patriotic movements that gave rise to the Argentine Republic. He is registered in the Gazeta de Buenos Ayres on Saturday, April 6, 1816, participating in the donations tending to the financing of the liberation expeditions that took place during the Argentine War of Independence.

== Biography ==
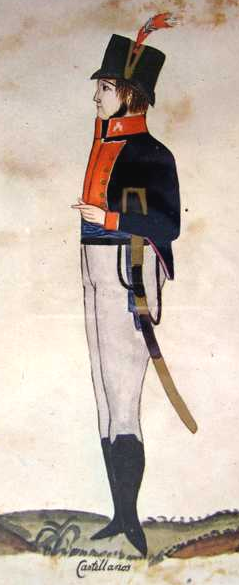
Uniform belonging to the Third of Vizcaínos

Joaquín Canaveris was born in Buenos Aires, son of Juan Canaveris, born in Northern Italy, and Bernarda Catalina de Esparza, belonging to an old patrician family the city. He possibly studied in the Escuela Nacional de Náutica or Colegio Real de San Carlos, and law at the University of Córdoba. He was married on March 21, 1819 in the Parish Nuestra Señora de Montserrat to his relative María Ana Bayá, daughter of Juan Bayá Más Rossel, born in Girona, and María Agustina Canaveris Esparza.

His beginnings in military and political life were during the English invasions of 1806 and 1807. He served as Adjutant in the 7th Company of Asturians, and taking part in the Combate de Miserere, under the Command of Captain Miguel Cuyar. He served in the same company as his brother-in-law Fernando López Linera, a trader dedicated to exporting leather. His cousin or relative Martín Esparza, friar of Santo Domingo, was killed, during the assault of British troops to the convent.

The Tercio de Vizcaínos, was created during the first Invasion. It was formed by five companies from Biscay and Navarre, two from Asturias, and one from Castilla la Vieja. During the second invasion the third of Viscaínos participated in the Combat of Miserere.

His social ascent was after taking place the Declaration of Independence. In 1816 he was appointed to integrate a regiment of urban militias created by order of the Supreme Director of the United Provinces of the Río de la Plata. He also served as Alcalde in the neighborhood of Monserrat and San Nicolás, populated largely by traders of British and American origin. During his term, he sent to jail to Joseph Thwaites, a famous English merchant, who had been accused of debts.

During the colonial and post colonial period, the alcaldes, fulfilled police functions, being the ones in charge of the surveillance of the city. These officers were escorted by a civic group of militia formed by some neighbors, being armed with carbines, pistols and bowie knives.

He had a long career as an employee of the consulate of the Río de la Plata. He started working in that government agency since 1816 to replace Juan Antonio Zemborain. He had served with the Councilors Pastor Lezica, Francisco del Sar Arroyo and León Ortiz de Rozas.

In 1823 he held the position of syndic in the Consulate of Commerce of Buenos Aires, an institution dedicated to the control of commerce in the Río de la Plata, in charge of Victorio García de Zúñiga. He had also served as conciliator and attorney in Buenos Aires. In 1824, he was legal representative of José Joaquín de La Serna, in the trial against Manuel de las Carreras, represented by Miguel Mármol.

He served as legal executor in several testamentary, including his services provided to Mariano Olier, to his grandmother María Eugenia Sánchez, and his brother-in-law Juan Bayá Más Rosell. In 1814 he maintained a legal dispute against Isidro Rosell, (partner of Juan Bayá Más), who was represented by Josef Nadal and Juan Bautista Otamendi.

He also was in charge of the sale of an important property located in Palermo, belonging to the testamentary of the presbyter José Díaz. He was represented by Jaime Llavallol in a legal dispute made by his brother-in-law and nephew Juan Manuel Bayá, regarding his father's testamentary.

Joaquín Canaveris had an active participation in the economic activities in the Río de la Plata. In 1817 the ship Carmen arrived from Montevideo with a shipment that included pipes and barrels of wine, and several boxes of tea to Joaquin Canaveris. On November 14 of the same year he introduced a cargo in Buenos Aires that included, tobacco, twenty barrels of butter and bags of peanuts. He also sent a shipment to the Port of Maldonado that included farm equipment, black tobacco, wheat and thread destined for Uruguayan naval vessels.

He also participated in the donations made for the reorganization of the Argentine Army, after the Battle of Sipe-Sipe in the Upper Peru. His brother Manuel Canaveris was one of the officers who financed the first expedition to Upper Peru in 1810.

Like his family he was involved in the divisions between Unitarians and Federals. He gave his support to the Federal cause since the creation of that party in 1816.

Joaquín Canaveris Esparza died around 1833 in Buenos Aires. His great granddaughter, María Elena Canavery, was married to Cornelio Casablanca, a manager of the Banco Español del Río de la Plata. Several of his descendants were married to his relatives, like Rebeca Rodríguez Canavery, who was married to Ricardo Patricio Bayá y Canaveris, a grandson of Juan Manuel Canaveris y Denis. His great granddaughter Carmen Canavery Martínez, was married to Saturnino Canaveri Segrestán, son of his nephew Francisco Canaveris Pelliza.

== Joaquín Canavery ==
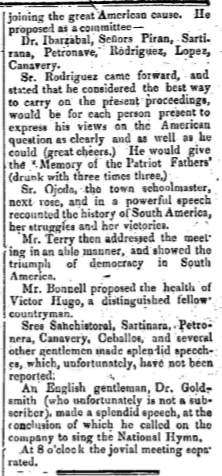
Joaquín Canavery in the edition of July 14, 1864 of The Standard and River Plate News.

His son Joaquín Canavery (1823-c. 1890), had a prominent role as a politician and soldier in the town of Carmen de Areco, where served as Captain in the Guardia Nacional de Infantería at the service of the State of Buenos Aires. He was Intendent in 1856–1857, 1862 and 1880. His appointment at the head of the Areco government had been by decree signed by Dalmacio Vélez Sársfield.

Fulfilling his services as judge of Carmen de Areco, he was commissioned to combat the illegal practice of medicine exercised by healers of Scottish or Irish origin. In 1880, he communicated to Martin de Gainza, that they had begun the works destined to the collection funds for the acquisition of arms and costumes for the Fortín de Areco.

In addition to serving in the border militias, Joaquín Canavery was the municipal treasurer of Areco. He was registered in the July 14, 1864 edition of the newspaper The Standard and River Plate News, where it is mentioned participating in the celebrations for the anniversary of the declaration of Independence of the Argentine Republic. His brother Adolfo Canavery, was also registered in that newspaper in the edition of December 31, 1862, where he is mentioned as one of the members of the Municipal Council of Areco.

His wife María Ceballos, served as teaching in Escuela de niñas del Fortín de Areco, the first educational establishment for girls of the town of Areco (inaugurated in 1857). She belonged to the family of Ramón Blanco, a politician of Galician roots who served as alcalde of Areco in 1814.

His wife was a cousin of Miguel Duffy, a prominent politician who served several terms as mayor of Carmen de Areco.
