= Pavone =

Pavone is a surname which may refer to:

== People ==
- Chris Pavone (born 1968), American novelist
- Claudio Pavone (1920–2016), Italian historian
- Dallas Von Pavone (1940-2012), American fine artist, musician, and actor
- Fabian Pavone (born 2000), Italian footballer
- Francesco Saverio Pavone (1944–2020), Italian magistrate
- Frank Pavone (born 1959), laicized American Roman Catholic priest
- Gonzalo Pavone (born 1977), Argentine retired footballer
- Kris Pavone, American professional wrestler
- Kyle Pavone (1990-2018), American singer
- Mariano Pavone (born 1982), Argentine professional footballer
- Mario Pavone (1940-2021), American jazz musician
- Michael Pavone, American film writer and director
- Pietro Pavone (born 1948), Italian botanist
- Rita Pavone (born 1945), Italian pop singer and film actress

== Fictional characters ==
- Signor Pavone Lanzetti, in the 1974 Italian film Swept Away

== See also ==
- Pavone del Mella, in the province of Brescia, Italy
- Pavone Canavese, in the province of Turin, Italy
