= Bartolomé Saravi =

Argentine army officer

Coronel Bartolomé Saraví

Ministro de Gobierno of La Rioja Province, Argentina
- In office 1847–1848
- Preceded by: Tomás Valdés
- Succeeded by: ?

Juez de Paz of Carmen de Areco
- In office 1840–1841
- Preceded by: ?
- Succeeded by: ?

Personal details
- Born: Francisco Cándido Bartolomé Saraví y Melo; 1797 Buenos Aires
- Died: 1862 (aged 64–65) Carmen de Areco, Buenos Aires Province
- Spouse: Simona Blanco (1798-1871)
- Occupation: military politician
- Profession: army

Military service
- Allegiance: Unitarian Army; Argentine Confederation; Ejército Grande; 1852
- Branch/service: Argentine Army
- Rank: Colonel
- Battles/wars: Argentine War of Independence; Argentine Civil Wars

Bartolomé Saraví (1797–1862) was an Argentine army officer who took part in the Argentine War of Independence. He served as General Minister of La Rioja Province, Argentina during the government of Vicente Mota in 1847.

== Biography ==
He was born in Buenos Aires, the son of Ramón Saraví and Margarita Melo, belonging to a distinguished Creole family. He did his elementary studies in Colegio Nacional de Monserrat, and completed his tertiary studies at the University of Córdoba. He served as a militia lieutenant in the Regimiento de Húsares de Buenos Aires, participating in some of the major skirmishes occurred towards the end of the War of Independence.

He also had an active participation in the Argentine civil wars serving in the ranks of Unitarian Army, and later to the cause of Argentine Confederation. In 1840 he was deposed from the post of Juez de paz of Carmen de Areco by order of Hilario Lagos due to disagreements with Juan Manuel de Rosas. Years later in 1847 he was appointed to the post of Minister General of La Rioja by then-Governor Vicente Maza, a politician of Federal leaning deposed from office in 1848.

In 1852 he joined the Ejército Grande participating in the Battle of Caseros against the troops of Juan Manuel de Rosas.

== Family ==
Bartolomé Saraví was married to Simona Blanco, daughter of Ramón Blanco and Basilia Biaus, belonging to a family of landowners of Carmen de Areco. He and his wife were parents of Federico Saraví, married to Luisa Walker Serrano, the sister of Abraham Walker, and Mariano Saraví, husband of Juana Hardy, daughter of Pilar Sosa and Tomás Hardy, an English immigrant.

His son Fermín Saravi, a Captain of the Argentine army, was married to Faustina Canavery, daughter of Joaquín Canavery and María Ana Bayá, belonging to a Creole family of Irish roots.

His father Ramón Saraví, was killed while defending the city against the British during the first English Invasion of Buenos Aires.
