= Battle of Montevideo (1807) =

1807 battle of the British invasions of the River Plate

- Part of the British invasions of the River Plate
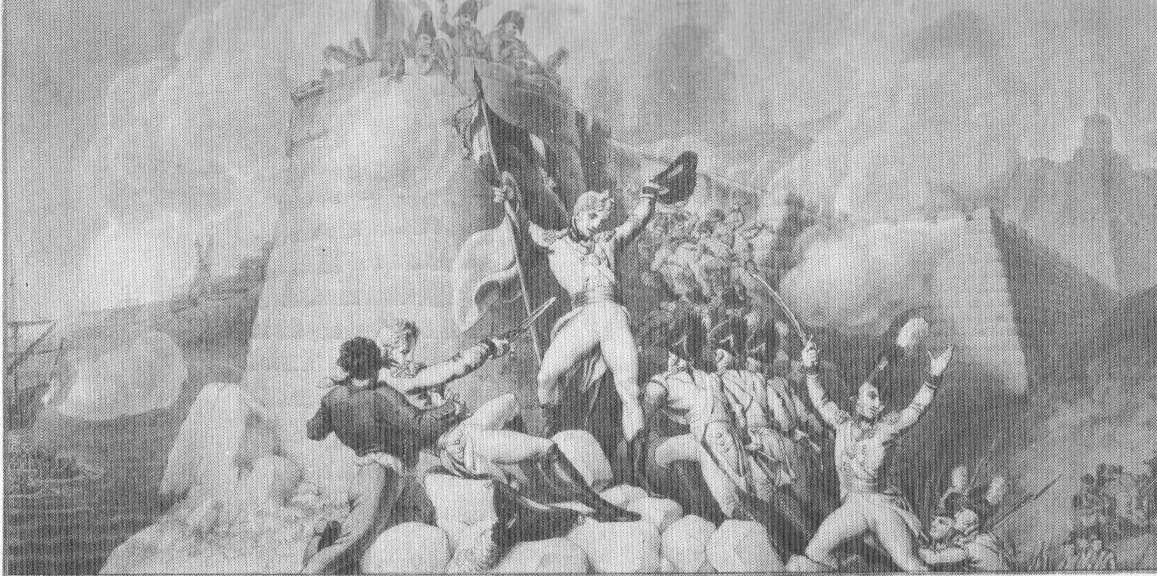
- British troops attacking a breach in Montevideo during the battle
Date	3 February 1807
Location	Montevideo, Uruguay 34.91002°S 56.20327°W
Result	British victory

Belligerents
United Kingdom	Spain

Commanders and leaders
Sir Samuel Auchmuty	Pascual Ruiz Huidobro

Strength
6,000	5,000

Casualties and losses
150 killed 450 wounded	500 killed 1,000 wounded 2,000 captured

The Battle of Montevideo took place between the British and Spanish Empires during the Napoleonic Wars, in which British forces captured the city of Montevideo. It formed part of the British invasions of the River Plate. Locally, it is known as the siege of Montevideo (Spanish: Sitio de Montevideo).

== Background ==
In the early morning of 3 February 1807, 3,000 British troops under Brigadier-general Sir Samuel Auchmuty attacked the city of Montevideo. The city's capture was preceded, on 20 January, by an action outside the town, the Battle of El Cristo del Cardal (or Battle of Cardal), in which the 60th Rifles and the 95th Foot (later the Rifle Brigade), especially distinguished itself by an outflanking movement which turned the tide of the battle in favour of the British. About 800 local combatants, mostly non-professional soldiers, became casualties, of whom about 200 were killed. Total British casualties were about 70 killed and wounded.

== Battle ==
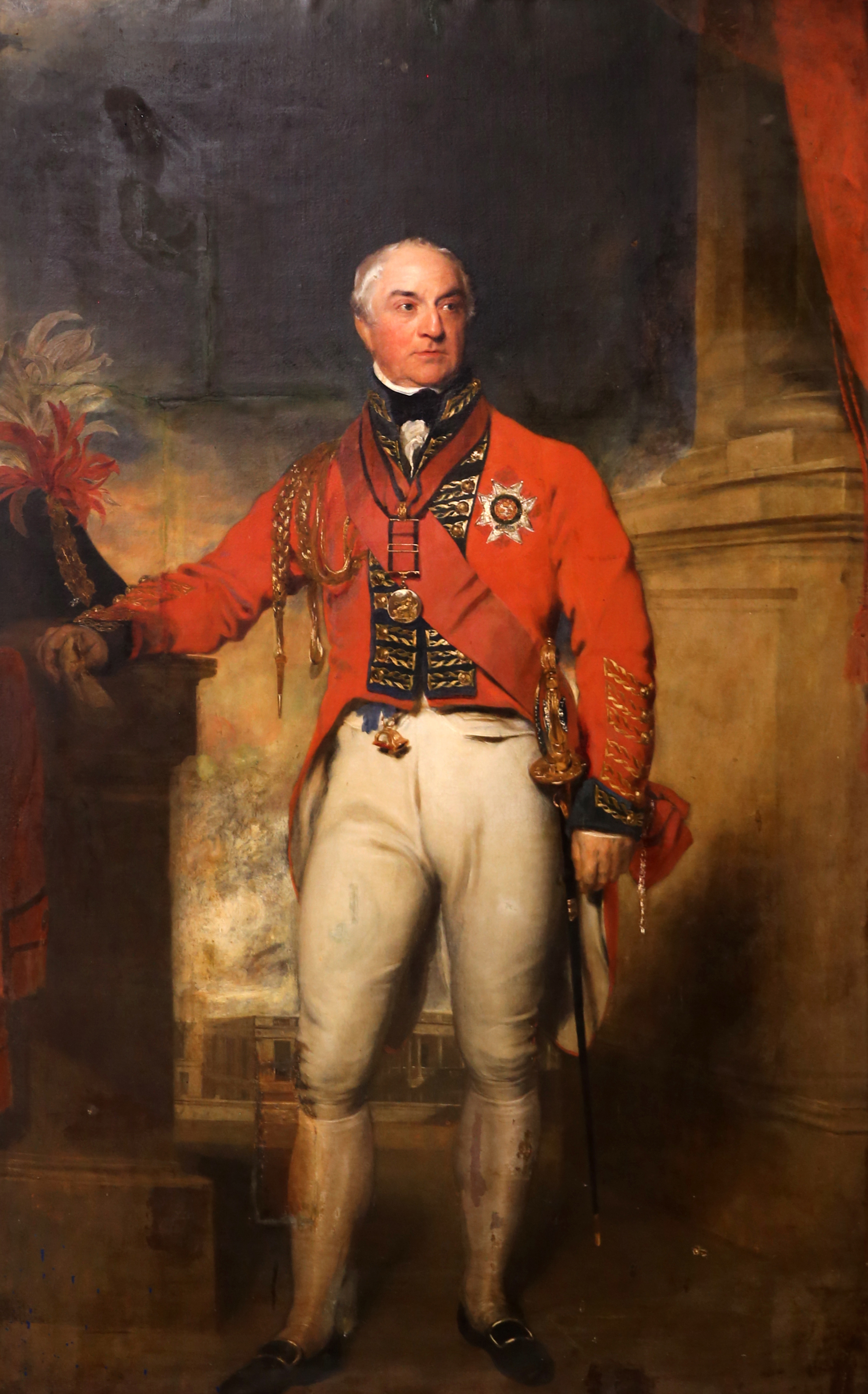
Sir Samuel Auchmuty, the British commander at the battle

Montevideo was put under siege from that date and its capture began at about 2:00 A.M., 3 February, having been preceded by several days of bombardment of the weakest part of the defensive wall at a point very close to the site of the modern Anglican cathedral. Once the breach was large enough the assault began. It was under heavy fire from two contiguous bastions held by the defenders, and was hampered by hides the defenders added to the wall to partially fill the breach. Casualties amongst the British soldiers were heavy, as the troops sought an entry point while caught in a constant cross-fire.

Finally, the breach was located by Captain Renny, 40th Regiment of Foot (later the South Lancashire Regiment), who was killed while attempting to get through it. Lieutenant Harry Smith of the 95th Regiment of Foot, on his first campaign, was the second to locate the breach. Once inside the walls, the British continued to meet heavy resistance, but they gradually spread out and forced back the defenders. At this point in the battle two leading British officers, Lieutenant-Colonel Brownrigg, 11th Foot, commanding the light infantry detachment, and Lieutenant-Colonel Vassal 38th Foot, were mortally wounded.

A forlorn hope was formed by a small detachment of the 54th Foot. This was followed by the combined, elite light infantry and grenadier companies of the regiments involved, as well as the 95th. Next in line were the 38th Foot, followed by the 40th Foot. Two cavalry detachments, from the 17th Light Dragoons and 20th Light Dragoons and 21st Light Dragoons, formed the reserve and rearguard, together with the 47th Regiment of Foot and a small detachment of recruits for the 71st Regiment of Foot (later the Highland Light Infantry). A detachment of Royal Marines was also present. Reinforcements for the defenders were en route from Buenos Aires, so that the rapid success of the operation was essential.

Meanwhile, at the other side of the peninsula, on which the Old City of Montevideo stands, the 87th Foot (later Royal Irish Fusiliers) were waiting together with a company of the 95th at the city's second main gate, the San Pedro gate. On hearing the noise of battle inside the walls, the 87th did not wait for the gate to be opened for them by their comrades according to the plan of attack; they scaled the wall and attacked the defenders from behind. During the operation, the 87th captured a flag from one of the defending formations, which is now displayed as the 'Flag of Montevideo' in the museum of the Royal Irish Fusiliers at Armagh, Northern Ireland.

The 95th then occupied the tower of the city's cathedral, and were able to use the modern Baker rifle to great effect against the city's main fortress, the Ciudadela. This, together with the general British advance through the city, led Governor Ruiz Huidobro to accept Auchmuty's offer and surrender unconditionally at about 5:00 A.M. In his dispatch, which announced the city's capture, Auchmuty paid tribute to Ruiz Huidobro, and by extension his force, who "defended the town and citadel of Monte Video with great spirit." He also made mention of the Frenchman Hipolite Mordeille, who had been prominent throughout the defence. Mordeille's corps had been entrusted with the defence of the breach, being "best calculated for that arduous service, in which they were very nearly annihilated", in the British commander's opinion. Mordeille himself was killed.

== Aftermath ==
Although there was some looting, which was rapidly suppressed by British officers, by 8:00 A.M. it was reported by a local resident that civilians were going about their normal business in the streets and mixing with British troops. The occupation of the city by the British army lasted until September 1807, when troops were withdrawn in compliance with the agreement signed following the surrender of British forces in Buenos Aires in July 1807 after the defeat of their second attempt to take the Viceroyalty of the Río de la Plata from Spain.

Auchmuty and the forces under him, as well as the supporting Royal Navy forces, received votes of thanks from the British Parliament on 16 April 1807. In addition, the 38th, 40th, 87th and 95th Regiments of Foot, were awarded the battle honour 'Monte Video', which their successor regiments inherited.

== Bibliography ==
- José BATLLE y CARREÓ. 'Memorias' in (Revista Histórica tomo VII No 19 pp146–164, Montevideo, 1914).
- George BRUCE. Harbottle's Dictionary of Battles. (Van Nostrand Reinhold, 1981) (ISBN 0-442-22336-6).
- Ernestina COSTA. English Invasion of the River Plate (Guillermo Kraft Ltda., Buenos Aires, 1937).
- Ian FLETCHER. The Waters of Oblivion: The British Invasion of the Rio de la Plata (Spellmont Ltd. Tonbridge Wells, 1991). (ISBN 0-946771-69-3)
- Juan Carlos LUZURIAGA. Una Gesta Heroica: Las Invasiones Inglesas y la defensa del Plata (Torre de Vigia Ediciones, Montevideo, 2004). (ISBN 9974-7789-2-1)
- Antonio N. PEREIRA. La Invasion inglesa del Rio de la Plata (Renaud Reynaud, Montevideo, 1877).
- Carlos ROBERTS. Las invasiones inglesas. (Emece Ediciones, Buenos Aires, 2000).
- John TUCKER, Maj. A Narrative of the Operation of Small British Force under the Command of Brigadier-General Sir Samuel Auchmuty, employed in the Reduction of Monte Video on the River Plate, A.D. 1807. By a Field Officer on the Staff. (John Joseph Stockdale, London, 1807).
