= José Francisco Ugarteche =

Paraguayan jurist and politician

Doctor José Francisco Ugarteche y Herrera
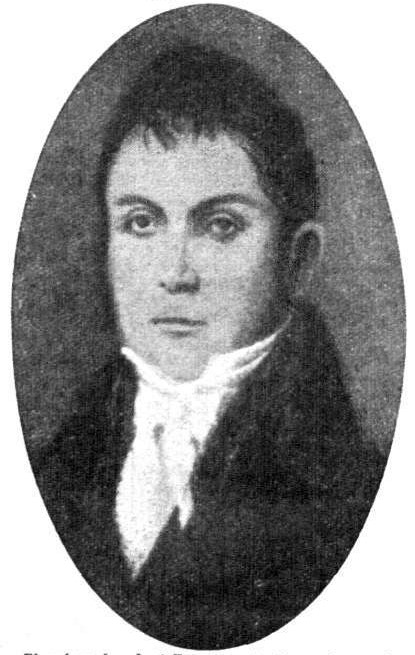

Abogado of the Real Audiencia of Buenos Aires
- In office 1800–1804
- Preceded by: ?
- Succeeded by: ?

Diputado of the Assembly of the Year XIII by La Rioja Province
- In office 1813–1813

Minister of Foreign Affairs of the Argentine Confederation
- In office 1832–1833

Personal details
- Born: 1768 Villarrica, Paraguay
- Died: July 3, 1834 (aged 65–66) Buenos Aires, Argentina
- Resting place: La Recoleta cemetery
- Party: Federalist
- Spouse(s): Juana Marta González; María Josefa de Echenagucía
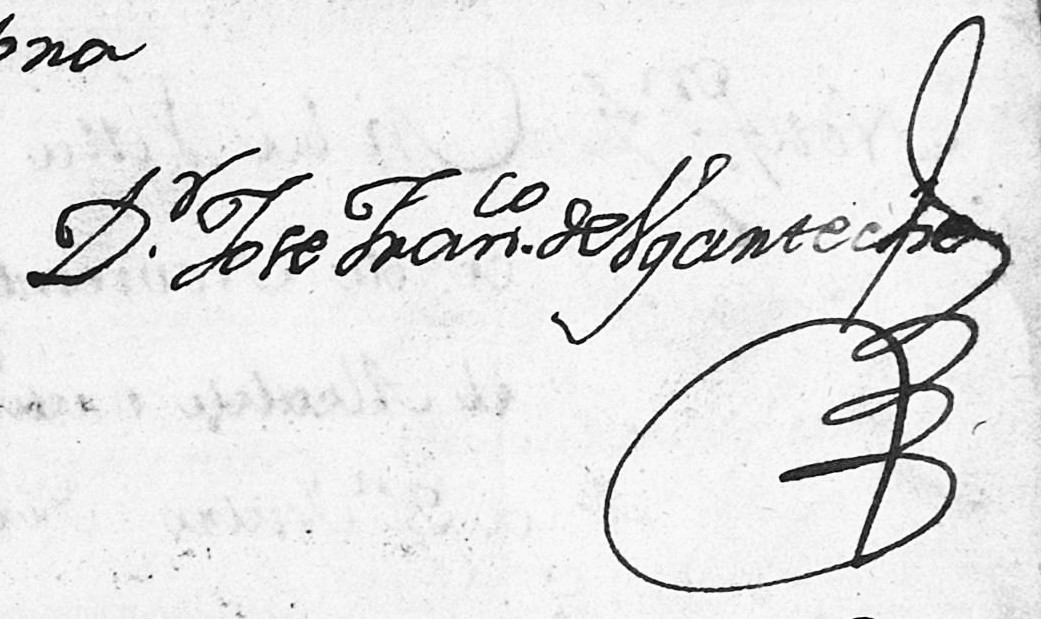
- Signature

José Francisco Ugarteche (1768-1834) was a Paraguayan jurist and politician, who had outstanding performance during the colonial and post colonial period of Argentina.

== Biography ==
He was born in Villarrica, Guairá District, Paraguay, the son of José Ramón de Ugarteche and María Josefa Herrera, belonging to a Patrician Paraguayan family of Spanish Basque descent. Established in Buenos Aires from a young age he was married in the city of Luján with Juana Marta González Casco de Mendoza, a distinguished Creole lady descendant of Víctor Casco de Mendoza. He was also married to María Josefa de Echenagucía, a Creole of Basque ancestors.

José Francisco Ugarteche did his studies in the University of Saint Francis Xavier, where he earned his law degree. During the colonial period he served as regidor of Luján, and attorney of the Real Audiencia of Buenos Aires. After the May Revolution occurred he occupied strategic political positions, being a member of Assembly of the Year XIII.

He belonged to the Federal Party, serving as provincial deputy of Santiago del Estero and Buenos Aires in 1827 and 1830. He supported the governments of Manuel Dorrego and Juan Manuel de Rosas. He was private secretary of José Rondeau, during his term as governor of the province of Buenos Aires, and also served as Minister of Foreign Affairs during the government of Juan Ramón Balcarce.

He maintained an excellent relationship with José Gaspar Rodríguez de Francia, dictator of Paraguay, and he also maintained a good relationship with Manuel Dorrego, with whom he founded the newspaper El Argentino.

His son, Pedro Amaranto Ugarteche, was the husband of María Santibáñez Sarmiento, a cousin of Domingo Faustino Sarmiento. His grandson Nicolás Ugarteche, was married to Isolina Canavery, daughter of Joaquín Canavery and María Ana Bayá, belonging to distinguished family of Carmen de Areco.

The town of Ugarteche, located in the Province of Mendoza bears his name in his honor.
