= Galicia Central Tower =

Skyscraper in Buenos Aires

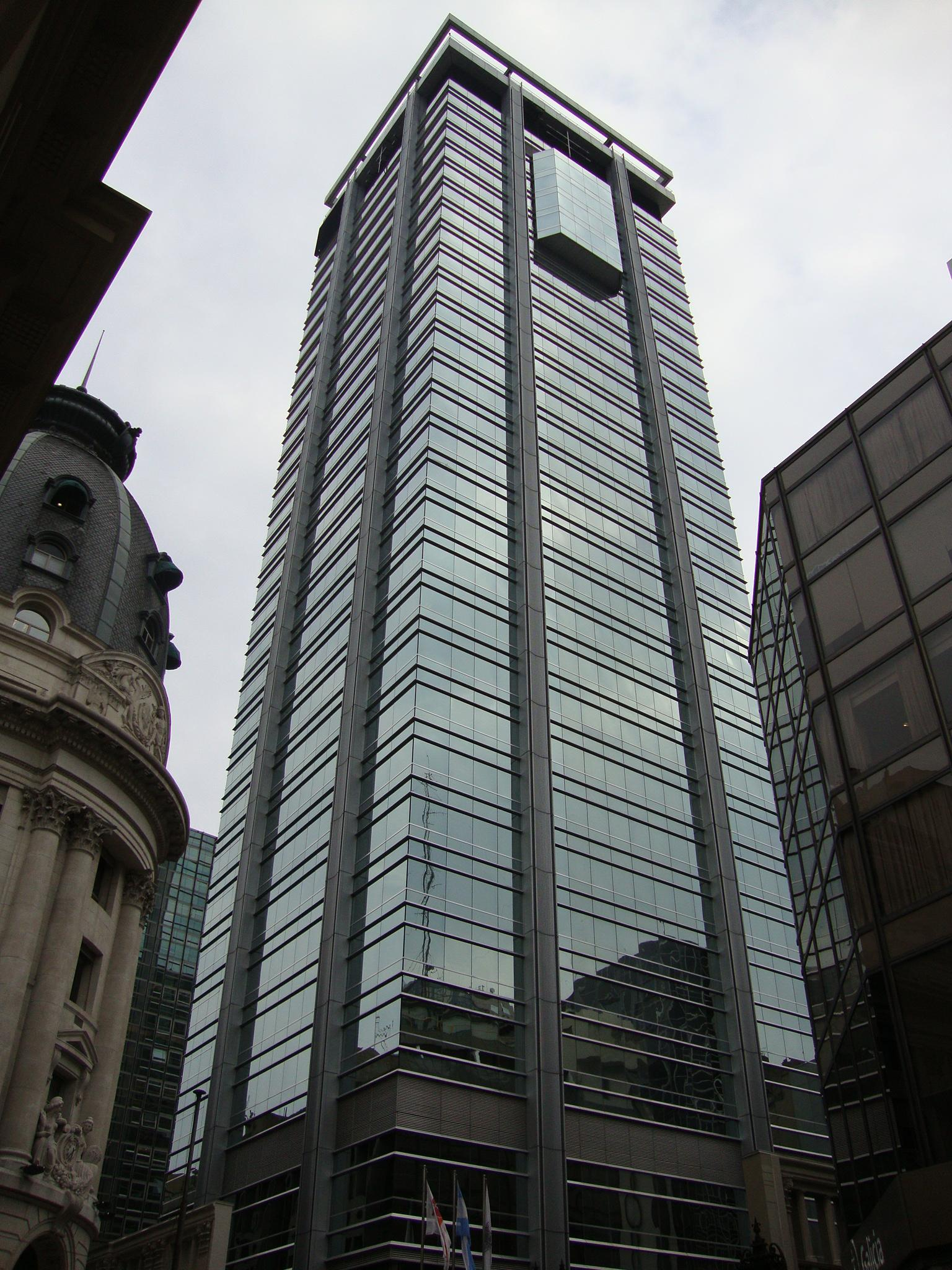

General information
- Status: Completed
- Type: Office
- Location: Buenos Aires, Argentina, Tte. Gral. Juan Domingo Perón 430 piso 6, Buenos Aires
- Coordinates: 34.60577°S 58.37267°W
- Construction started: 2000
- Completed: 2007

Height
- Roof: 145 m (476 ft)

Technical details
- Structural system: Concrete
- Floor count: 33 (+4 underground)
- Floor area: 39,400 m^{2} (424,000 sq ft)

Design and construction
- Architect: Mario Roberto Álvarez y Asociados
- Structural engineer: Lavallaz, Yentel & Associates

The Galicia Central Tower (Spanish: Torre Galicia Central) is an office skyscraper in Buenos Aires, Argentina, currently serving as the headquarters of the Grupo Financiero Galicia financial company. Completed between 2000 and 2007 and standing at 145 m (476 ft) tall with 33 floors, it is the twelfth tallest building in Buenos Aires.

== History ==
=== Site and construction ===
Between 1906 and 1999, on the current site of the Galicia Tower, the building of the Banco Español del Río de la Plata old headquarters was occupying the plot. In late 1999, Grupo Financiero Galicia bought the site as the Government of the City of Buenos Aires (GCBA) gave the approval for the Galicia Tower's plans designed by Argentine architect Mario Roberto Álvarez alongside his Associates' studio (MRAyA). The local Secretary of Planning Enrique García Espil argued that the construction of the tower was intended to give a new boost to the Buenos Aires city area, retaining the headquarters of numerous banks that had begun to move to other neighborhoods.

In January 2000, the Banco Español del Río de la Plata old building was demolished, despite being considered to be of historical value but without legal protection from the Banco Galicia project. The process generated a strong impact in the media, where several heritage and conservation experts harshly criticized the Buenos Aires government's endorsement of the MRAyA project which was modified to preserve the side wings of the original façade. Interior elements, such as the stained glass that adorned the central skylight of the bank, were saved and preserved to be donated to the Buenos Aires Museum of Modern Art.

=== Impact of the national economic crisis ===
The construction of the Galicia Central Tower began after the first setback, but the national economic crisis generated harsh consequences for Grupo Financiero Galicia, thus the work was suspended between 2001 and early 2003. It was not until 2007 when the construction was officially completed.

During the halted construction of the tower, a team from the Center for Urban Archaeology of the University of Buenos Aires carried out archaeological excavations, finding around 9,000 artifacts dating from between the 16th and 20th centuries.

== Architecture ==
The land plot of the tower measures 3,266 m^{2} (35,200 sq ft). The construction is part of a program whose primary aim was to bring together the different bank branches located in various buildings in the area. The two original facades of the Banco Español del Río de la Plata old headquarters building were left intact. The structure stands apart from its neighboring axes, creating a unique presence that enables the city to connect with a large public entrance supported by a canopy typical of the MRAyA studio, which also acts as a foundation for the main part of the building.

The entire lot is covered by a mezzanine and three basements in the building, with the first basement dedicated to customer service and an auditorium on the mezzanine. Next, the office space for employees is planned between the 3rd and 23rd levels, while the 24th to 28th levels are designated for executive offices and management facilities. These floors feature a bow-window on the north side that is five times taller than usual, setting them apart from the rest of the building.

The building's glazing type is Double Hermetic laminated heat-strengthened glass with 12 mm structural silicone frames.

== See also ==
- List of tallest buildings in Argentina
- List of tallest buildings in Buenos Aires
- List of tallest buildings in South America

== Gallery ==
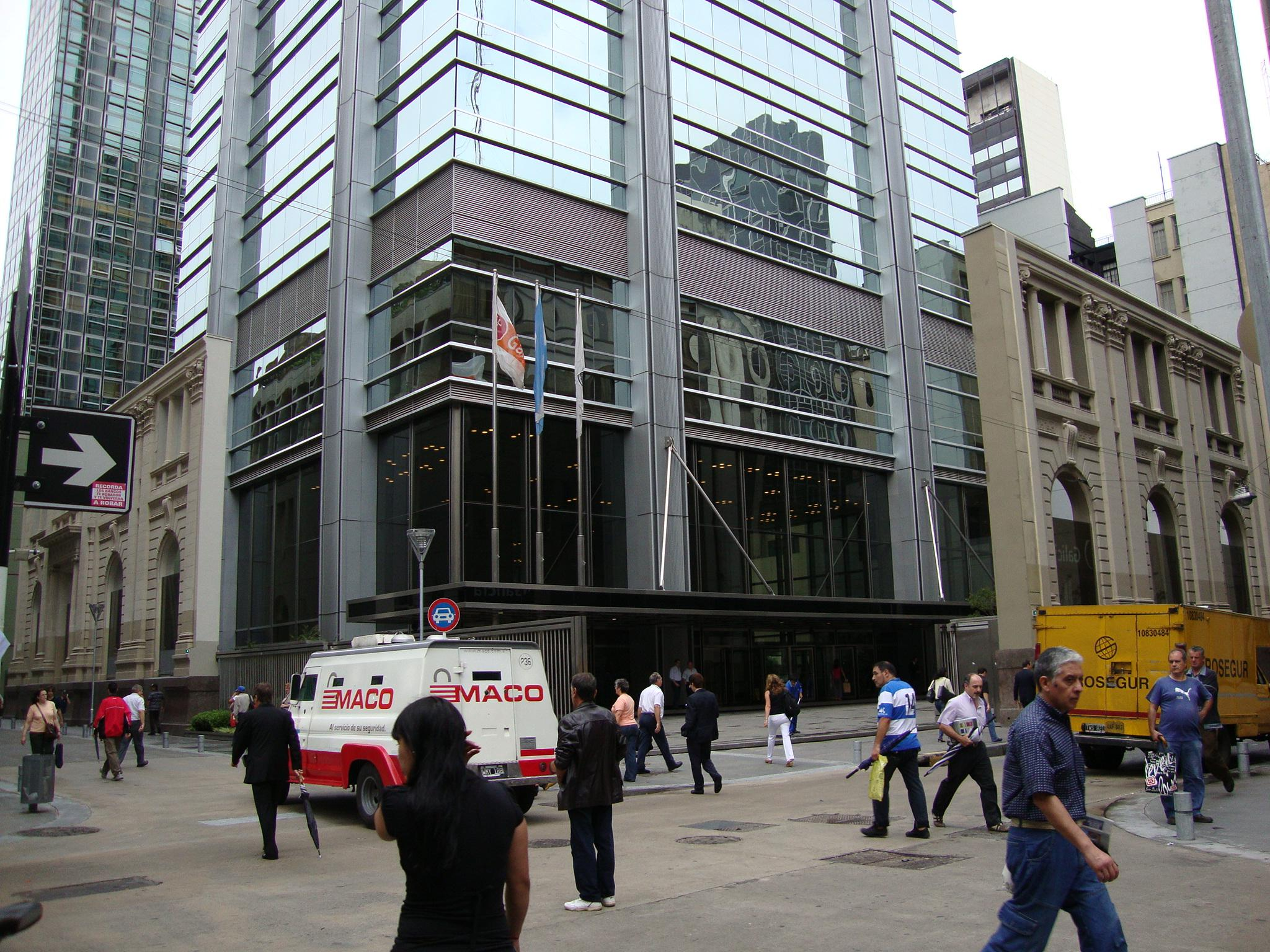
The building's ground level seen from the Nuestra Señora de la Merced Basilica

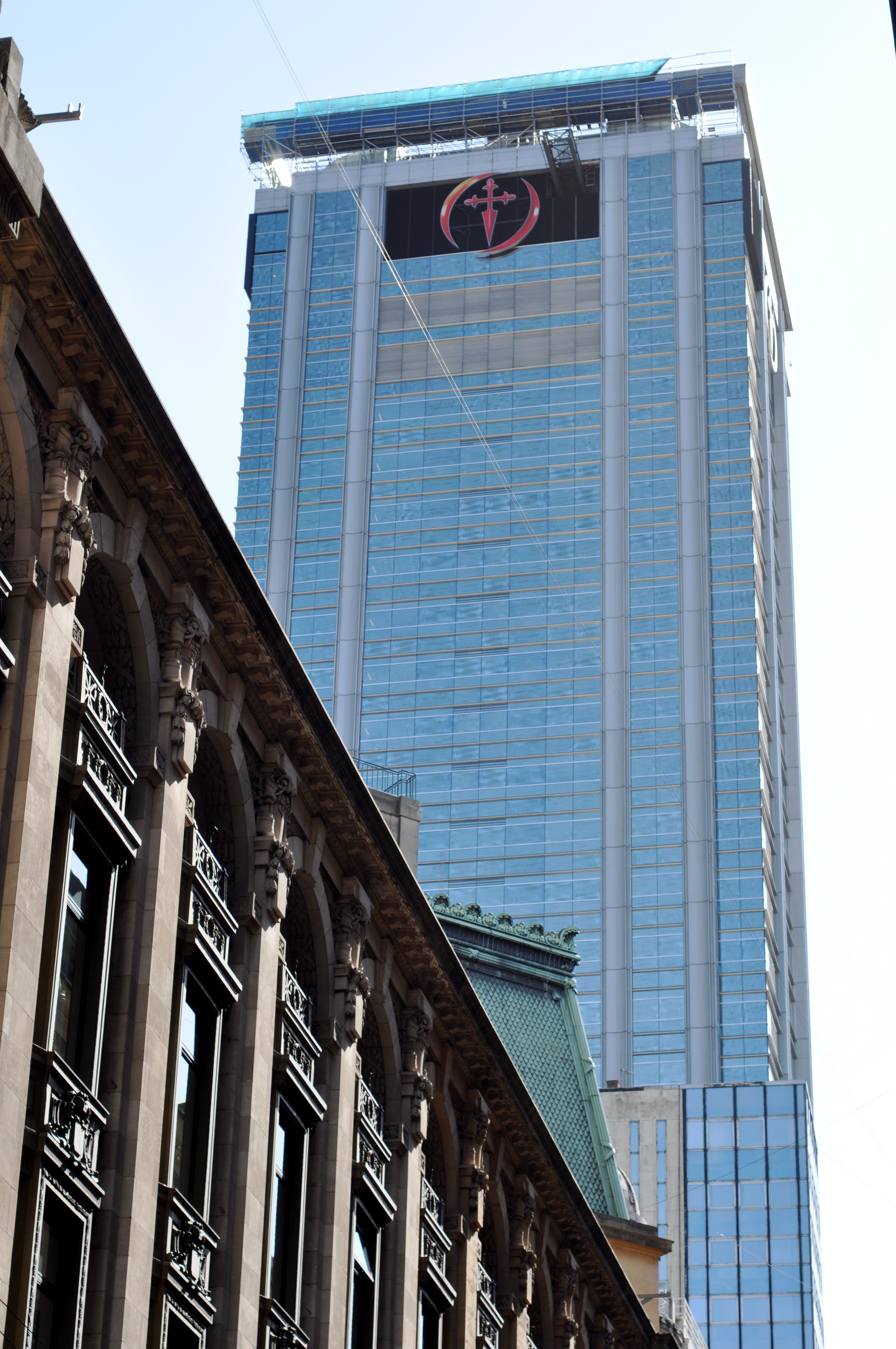
The Galicia Tower in 2009, two years after completion
