= Battle of Miserere =

1807 battle during the second British invasion of the Río de la Plata

- Part of the Napoleonic Wars
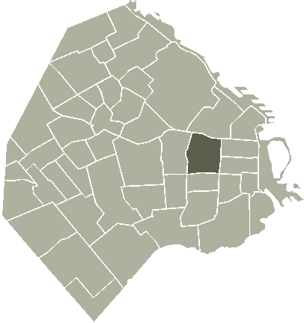
Date	2 July 1807
Location	Corrales de Miserere, Buenos Aires, Spanish Empire 34°36′34″S 58°24′25″W
Result	British victory

Belligerents
Spain	(United Kingdom of Great Britain and Ireland) United Kingdom

Commanders and leaders
Santiago de Liniers; Bernardo de Velasco; Juan Pío de Gana	John Whitelocke; Robert Craufurd; Denis Pack; John Levison Gower; John Squire

Units involved
Regimiento Fijo de Buenos Aires; Tercio de Vizcaínos; Batallón de Arribeños; Tercio de Miñones de Cataluña; Cuerpo de Blandengues.	95th Rifle Regiment; 36th Regiment of Foot

Strength
1,300 militiamen	900 soldiers
- Location within Buenos Aires Province Battle of Miserere (Argentina)

Battle of Miserere occurred during the second British invasion of the Río de la Plata between the British troops at the command of John Whitelocke, and the Spanish forces commanded by Santiago de Liniers. The confrontation took place on 2 July 1807 in the current Miserere square, Balvanera neighborhood, Buenos Aires. The British troops prevailed, but General Gower discouraged further advances, and gave orders to Colonel Crauford to stop the pursuit of the defeated, allowing them to entrench themselves in the city.
