= Miguel Duffy =

Argentine landowner, merchant, and politician

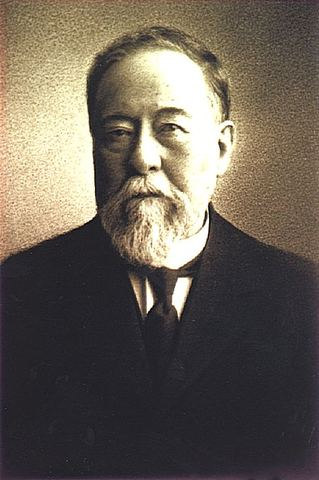

Mayor of Carmen de Areco
- In office 1874–1875
- Preceded by: Manuel Ramos
- Succeeded by: Balodomero Lamela

Mayor of Carmen de Areco
- In office 1878–1880
- Preceded by: Manuel Ramos
- Succeeded by: Melchor Ibarzábal

Mayor of Carmen de Areco
- In office 1881–1887
- Preceded by: Joaquín Canavery
- Succeeded by: Ramón A. Muñoz

Mayor of Carmen de Areco
- In office 1893–1895
- Preceded by: Mariano J. Romero
- Succeeded by: Pedro Dutey

Personal details
- Born: Miguel Antonio Duffy Taaffe; 1845 Carmen de Areco, Buenos Aires, Argentina
- Died: July 22, 1925 (aged 79–80) Buenos Aires, Argentina
- Party: National Autonomist Party; Radical Civic Union
- Spouse: Francisca de Magallanes

Miguel Duffy (1845–1925) was an Argentine landowner, merchant and politician, who served for several periods as Intendant of Carmen de Areco, in the Buenos Aires province.

== Biography ==
He was born in Carmen de Areco, the son of John Duffy, born in Longford, and Elizabeth Taaffe, born in Westmeath. He was married in the Parish Nuestra Señora del Carmen de Areco to Francisca de Magallanes, daughter of Saturnino Magallanes and María Josefa Sierra, belonging to an old family of the town of Areco. He and his wife were the parents of several children, including Eduardo Duffy, a distinguished rancher and politician who served for several terms as congressman of Córdoba.

His wife was related to María Ceballos Blanco, the wife of Joaquín Canavery, intendant of Areco in 1856–1857.

Duffy was appointed for the first time to occupy the position of mayor of the town of Areco in 1874, being replaced by Baldomero Lamela. He returned to occupy the leadership of the town between 1878 and 1879, 1881–1887 and 1893–1894.

In 1900, Miguel Duffy founded the town of Wheelwright in General López, Santa Fe Province. He was also dedicated to agriculture, he owned land in the villages of Areco and Colón.
