= Tres Sargentos =

- Town
- Location in Argentina
- Coordinates: 34°27′S 60°01′W
- Country: Argentina
- Province: Buenos Aires
- Partido: Carmen de Areco Partido
- Established: 1907
- Elevation: 35 m (115 ft)

Population ((2001 census [INDEC]))
  - Total: 324
- CPA Base: B 6727
- Area code: +54 2273

Tres Sargentos is a village in Carmen de Areco Partido, Buenos Aires Province, Argentina.

== History ==
The General Manuel Belgrano railway was laid through the area in 1906, the station was established in 1907.

== Name ==
The name of the settlement was inspired by events following the defeat of the Army of the North at the Battle of Vilcapugio, when General Manuel Belgrano sent Gregorio La Madrid three soldiers and the native Reynaga on a reconnaissance mission. They came across a number of the enemy, formed a plan of attack and took them hostage. The raid is remembered as action of Tambo Nuevo. The streets are named in honour of military personnel at the battle José María Gómez, Santiago Albarracin, Juan Bautista Salazar, Indio Reynaga, General Lamadrid and General Belgrano.

== Famous residents ==
The small settlement has produced a number of professional footballers, the brothers Mariano and Gonzalo Pavone as well as their cousin José Basanta come from Tres Sargentos.
