= John Squire (British Army officer) =

British Army officer

John Squire (1780–1812) was a British Army officer who rose to become a brevet lieutenant-colonel in the Corps of Royal Engineers during the Napoleonic Wars. Being a writer and diarist who kept journals of his travels, these and his supporting role in some of military campaigning's great moments – Egypt in 1801, South America in 1807, Sweden in 1808, the Netherlands at various stages and Spain in 1811–12 – have made Squire a moderately well-known figure among scholars who study the era.

== Early life ==
The eldest son of Dr. John Squire (1732–1816) of Ely Place, London, the founder in 1788 the Society for the Relief of Widows and Orphans of Medical Men, he was born in London. He was educated at Charterhouse School under Matthew Raine, and, after passing through the Royal Military Academy at Woolwich, he received a commission as second lieutenant in the Royal Engineers in January 1797. He was promoted to be first lieutenant on 29 August 1798.

In August 1799, Squire embarked with the Helder Expedition (the Anglo-Russian invasion of Holland) under Sir Ralph Abercromby. He took part in the engagement of 10 September, when he was wounded. He was also in the actions of Bergen and Alkmaar on 2 and 6 October. He returned with the army to England at the end of October.

== In the Mediterranean ==
In 1801, Squire went to Egypt, and served throughout the campaign there under Abercromby and under General Hutchinson. He was present at the Battle of Alexandria on 21 March, the capture of Rosetta on 8 April, the capture of Fort St. Julien after a three days' siege on 19 April, the siege of Alexandria in August, and its capitulation, after an armistice of some days, on 2 September.

On the conclusion of the Egyptian campaign, Squire obtained leave of absence, and, in company with William Martin Leake and William Richard Hamilton, made a tour through Syria and Greece. On leaving Athens for Malta in the brig Mentor, laden with some of the Elgin Marbles, Squire's party was wrecked on the island of Cythera on 17 September 1802, and narrowly escaped death. Many of the marbles and some papers were recovered.

== Service in South America and northern Europe ==
Squire was promoted to be captain lieutenant in February 1803, and second captain on 19 July 1804. He was employed in the southern military district on the defences of the coast of Sussex. On 1 July 1806 he was promoted to be first captain, and appointed commanding royal engineer in the expedition to South America. He accompanied Sir Samuel Auchmuty to the Río de la Plata, landing in January 1807. Squire conducted the siege operations at Montevideo: after a practicable breach was made, it was carried by storm on 3 February. He was also commanding Royal Engineer under Major-general John Whitelocke in the operations from 28 June to 5 July. It culminated in the attack on Buenos Aires and the surrender of Montevideo, and the expedition returned to England. Squire was a witness for the prosecution at the court-martial held in London in March 1808.

In April 1808 Squire accompanied Sir John Moore's expedition to Sweden, and in the summer went with Moore's army to Lisbon, taking part in all the operations of the campaign, which ended on 16 January 1809 in the Battle of Coruña. He embarked the same night with the army for England, arriving in February. In April he was sent by Lord Castlereagh in a frigate on a secret mission to the Baltic Sea, to report on the island of Bornholm as a defensive naval station.

On 28 July of the same year, Squire took part in the Walcheren Campaign. He sailed, as commanding Royal Engineer to Sir John Hope's division, with the army under the Earl of Chatham to the River Scheldt. On 30 July he reconnoitred the channel and shores of the East Scheldt with Captain Peake, R.N.. He took part in the siege of Vlissingen, and was present at its capture on 14 August, returning to England in December.

== Peninsular War and death ==
On 28 March 1810, Squire joined the Duke of Wellington's army in Portugal. He was employed on the lines of Torres Vedras, and on their completion was, in October, appointed regulating officer of No. 3 district, from Alhandra to the valley of Calhandriz. On the retreat of Masséna in March 1811, Squire accompanied Marshal Beresford's corps to the relief of Campo Maior on 25 March. At the end of March his bridges across the River Guadiana, and making a breach in the defences of Olivenza, contributed to the capture of the latter on 15 April. He was involved in the two sieges of Badajoz(5–12 May and 25 May – 10 June), and on both occasions Wellington mentioned him in his despatches.

On 21 June 1811, Squire was attached to Lieutenant-general Sir Rowland Hill's corps in Estremadura. He took part in the Battle of Arroyo dos Molinos, when the French general Girard suffered defeat on 28 October. His assistance was acknowledged by Hill in his despatch, and Squire was promoted on 5 December to be brevet major.

In March 1812, Squire was one of the two directors of the attack at the third siege of Badajoz under Sir Richard Fletcher, John Fox Burgoyne being the other; they took 24 hours' duty in the trenches turn about. On the capture of Badajoz by assault, on 6 April, Squire was mentioned by Wellington in his despatch, where he refers to the assistance which Squire rendered to Major James Wilson and the 48th regiment in establishing themselves in the ravelin of San Roque. Squire was promoted to be brevet lieutenant-colonel on 27 April, and was awarded the gold medal for Badajoz.

Squire continued to be attached to Hill's corps, which now attempted the destruction of the French bridge of boats at Almarez. But the siege of Badajoz had exhausted him; and, having repaired the bridge of Mérida, he was hastening to join Hill when he fell from his horse and was carried to Trujillo. There he died of fever on 19 May 1812.

One of his contemporaries, Lt. Col. John Fox Burgoyne CRE wrote in his diary on 23 May 1812 "We also learn that poor Squire died suddenly of a paralytic stroke at Truxillo; thus we have lost, in my mind, the best officer of the Corps, and a man who, I believe, never had an enemy"

== Works ==
During his stay in Egypt, with William Martin Leake and William Richard Hamilton, Squire deciphered the Greek inscription on Pompey's pillar at Alexandria. On arriving back in England, early in 1803, Squire and Leake presented to the Society of Antiquaries of London a memoir on the Pillar. It was read on 3 February by Matthew Raine of Charterhouse, who had suggested characters to replace the eighteen which were entirely obliterated (Archæologia, vol. xv.). Squire's journal is a source for his tour in Syria with Hamilton and Leake. Extracts were published in 1817.

In 1810, Squire published anonymously A Short Narrative of the late Campaign of the British Army, &c., with Preliminary Remarks on the Topography and Channels of Zeeland (2nd ed. same year). This work was critical of the conduct of the campaign. Squire also made detailed criticisms of the early Peninsular campaign, in letters to Henry Bunbury. Some of this correspondence survives.

In May 2016, a BBC Australian news article described the chance finding of one of his handwritten journals in a second-hand bookstore in Hobart, Tasmania. Previously unknown of, the journal covers the period from 12 May to 22 July 1811 and records technical aspects of the English-Portuguese army's first and second sieges of Badajoz before its fall a year later.

== Notes ==
Attribution

This article incorporates text from a publication now in the public domain: Lee, Sidney, ed. (1898). "Squire, John". Dictionary of National Biography. Vol. 53. London: Smith, Elder & Co.
