= Pascual Ruiz Huidobro =

Spanish soldier (1752–1813)

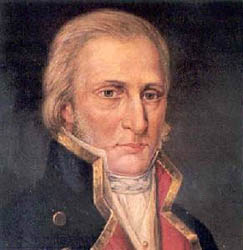
- Born: 1752; Ourense, Galicia, Spain
- Died: March 1813 (aged 60 or 61) Mendoza, Argentina
- Allegiance: Spain
- Service: Viceroyalty of the Río de la Plata

Pascual Ruiz Huidobro (Ourense, Galicia, 1752 – Mendoza, Argentina, March 1813), was a Spanish soldier in the Viceroyalty of the Río de la Plata, who fought against the British invasions of the Río de la Plata as Governor of Montevideo.

Ruiz Huidobro had a long naval service career in the Spanish Navy, in Cádiz and other locations. He arrived in the Río de la Plata with the Viceroy Ceballos expedition in 1777. After serving in different posts in Spanish America, he reached the post of Teniente General de Marina (Navy Lieutenant General). In 1803 he was named civil and military Governor of Montevideo and commander of the local navy fleet. The next year, with new Viceroy Sobremonte, he was named chief troop inspector of the viceroyalty, that is to say second in military command after the viceroy.

== The British Invasions of 1806–1807 ==
With the information that the British fleet was about to invade, the viceroy sent most of his troops to Montevideo, as it was thought to be the central focus of the invasion. Instead, the British landed near Buenos Aires and took it with little resistance.

Ruiz Huidobro organized an expedition to recapture Buenos Aires, but just as he was ready to leave, captain Liniers arrived with fresh information about the local resistance that was being formed, and he was given command of the troops. Using the Montevideo troops and the local resistance, Liniers retook the city, putting an end to the first invasion of 1806.

The next year saw the British come back in the second invasion, landing at Maldonado and then marching to Montevideo. Ruiz Huidobro made a serious strategic error by not defending the city from within the walled forts, coming out to do battle in open fields surrounding the city, where he was defeated. A few days later the city fell to the British. He was taken prisoner and sent to England.

About the same time, the cabildo in Buenos Aires decided on the ouster of viceroy Sobremonte and his replacement by the second in command, Ruiz Huidobro. But by being captured, he lost his opportunity to become viceroy.

== Return to the Río de la Plata ==
During the Spanish War of Independence, he was a deputy in Galicia's government junta.

When the Supreme Junta was formed in Seville, learned of Sobremonte's ouster, they named Ruiz Huidobro as his replacement as Viceroy of the Rio de la Plata, but when he arrived, he learned that the cabildo had named Liniers, who refused to cede command to him. As his naming to the post was not much more official that the one of Liniers, he accepted the post of Inspector of Arms of the Viceroyalty. This way he lost his second opportunity.

During the revolution of 1 January 1809, after the failure of the first attempts by Martín de Álzaga, he supported Bishop Lué's idea of replacing Liniers with the most senior officer. The candidate was Ruiz Huidobro, who was recognized as such by Liniers. The fast and sudden move by colonel Cornelio Saavedra saved the post for Liniers.

== May Revolution ==
He supported the May Revolution, and in the Cabildo Abierto of 22 May 1810, he was the second to speak, right after Bishop Lué. He voted for the deposition of the viceroy and giving political command and power to the Cabildo until the legitimate government of the King in Spain was restored (where the King was deposed by Napoleon, having placed his brother Joseph Bonaparte in Madrid). As the cabildo could not hold military command, the new candidate for the post was again Ruiz Huidobro. Following him at the Cabildo, Saavedra spoke supporting his argument but proposed instead a new form of government by a Junta, the motion that won the day. For fourth, and last, time he lost his opportunity to become viceroy.

During the new Junta's government Primera Junta he was relieved as military commander, as he was a suspect for being Spanish born. In 1812, the First Triumvirate included him in the investigations about the purported Álzaga conspiracy. He was not tried, but found it more prudent to travel to Chile, where he planned to offer his military services and experience to the dictator José Miguel Carrera. The Second Triumvirate named him ambassador to the Government in Chile. He never arrived as he died in transit in March 1813 in the city of Mendoza.
