= Gonzalo Pavone =

Argentine footballer

Personal information
- Full name: Gonzalo Norberto Pavone
- Date of birth: 14 June 1977 (age 49)
- Place of birth: Tres Sargentos, Argentina
- Height: 1.86 m (6 ft 1 in)
- Position: Striker

Senior career*
Years	Team	Apps	(Gls)
1997–1998	Estudiantes LP	7	(0)
1998–1999	Defensa y Justicia		
2000	Banfield		
2001	Arsenal Sarandí		
2002	Lodigiani		
2002–2003	Taranto		
2003	Independiente Rivadavia		
2003–2005	Extremadura	61	(22)
2005–2006	Ponferradina	36	(6)
2006–2007	Logroñés	19	(4)
2007	Alicante	10	(0)
2007–2008	Puertollano	22	(3)
2008–2009	All Boys		
2009–2010	Don Benito		
2010	Juventud Pergamino		
2010–2011	Defensores Salto		
2011–2012	Independiente Chivilcoy		
- * Club domestic league appearances and goals

Gonzalo Norberto Pavone (born 14 June 1977) is an Argentine retired footballer who played as a striker.

== Club career ==
Born in Tres Sargentos, Buenos Aires Province, Pavone made his senior debut in the 1997–98 season, appearing in seven scoreless games for Estudiantes de La Plata, after which he represented three teams in quick succession. Starting in the early 2000s and during one year, he played amateur football in Italy.

After a spell with Independiente Rivadavia in the Primera B Nacional, Pavone moved abroad again, joining CF Extremadura from Spain. He would remain in the country for the vast majority of the following seven years (safe for one season back in his homeland with All Boys), never competing in higher than Segunda División B.

Following the 2009–10 campaign in Tercera División, the 33-year-old Pavone was released by CD Don Benito where he had arrived on 31 January 2009. He returned to his country subsequently, playing exclusively at amateur level.

== Personal life ==
Pavone's younger brother, Mariano, was also a footballer and a striker. He too represented Estudiantes – with much more individual success – also playing abroad with Real Betis.
