= Carmen de Areco Partido =

Carmen de Areco Partido de Carmen de Areco
- Department
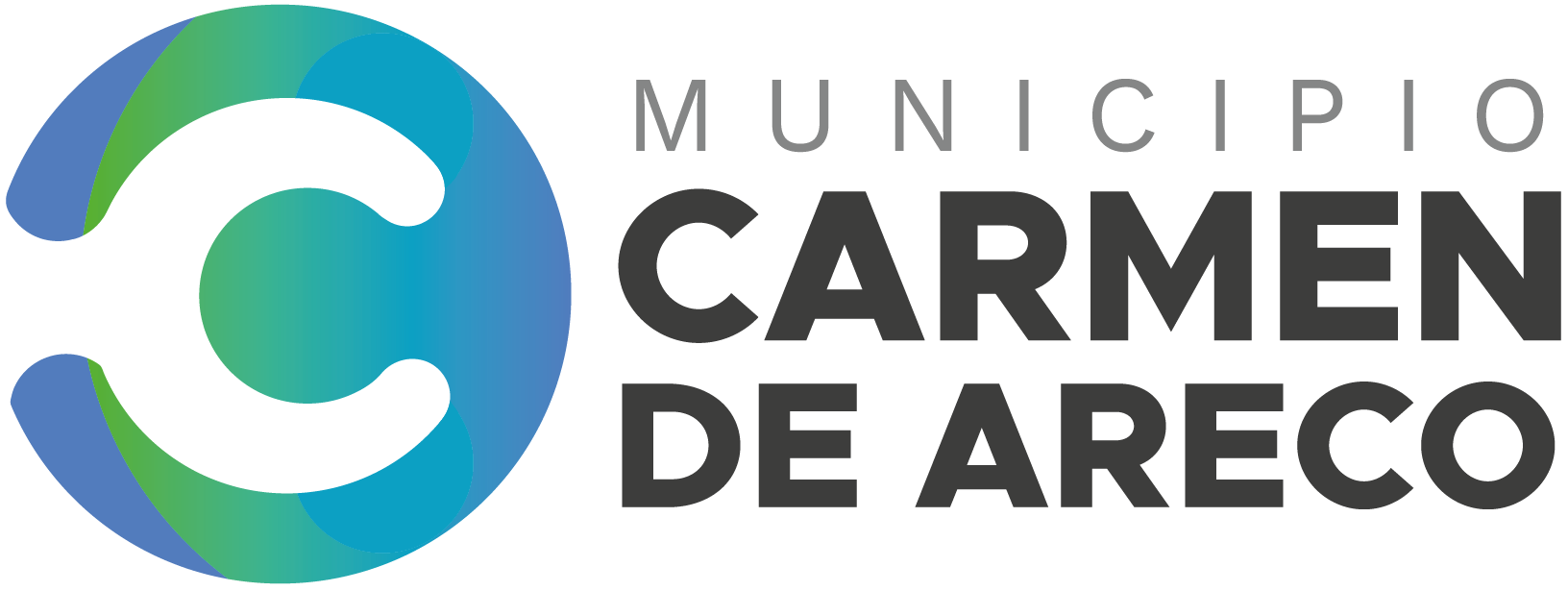

- Location of Carmen de Areco Partido in Buenos aires Province
- Coordinates: 34°23′S 59°49′W
- Country: Argentina
- Established: September 26, 1812
- Seat: Carmen de Areco

Government
  - Intendant: Iván Villagrán (PJ)

Area
  - Total: 1,080 km^{2} (420 sq mi)

Population
  - Total: 13,992
  - Density: 13.0/km^{2} (33.6/sq mi)
- Demonym: arecense
- Postal Code: B2725
- IFAM: BUE022
- Area Code: 02273
- Website: carmendeareco.gob.ar

Carmen de Areco is a partido of Buenos Aires Province in Argentina.

The provincial subdivision has a population of about 14,000 inhabitants in an area of 1,080 km^{2} (420 sq mi), and its capital city is Carmen de Areco, which is 140 km (87 mi) from Buenos Aires.

== Settlements ==
- Carmen de Areco
- Gouin
- Tres Sargentos
- Kenny
- Tatay
