= Mariano Pavone =

Argentine professional footballer (born 1982)

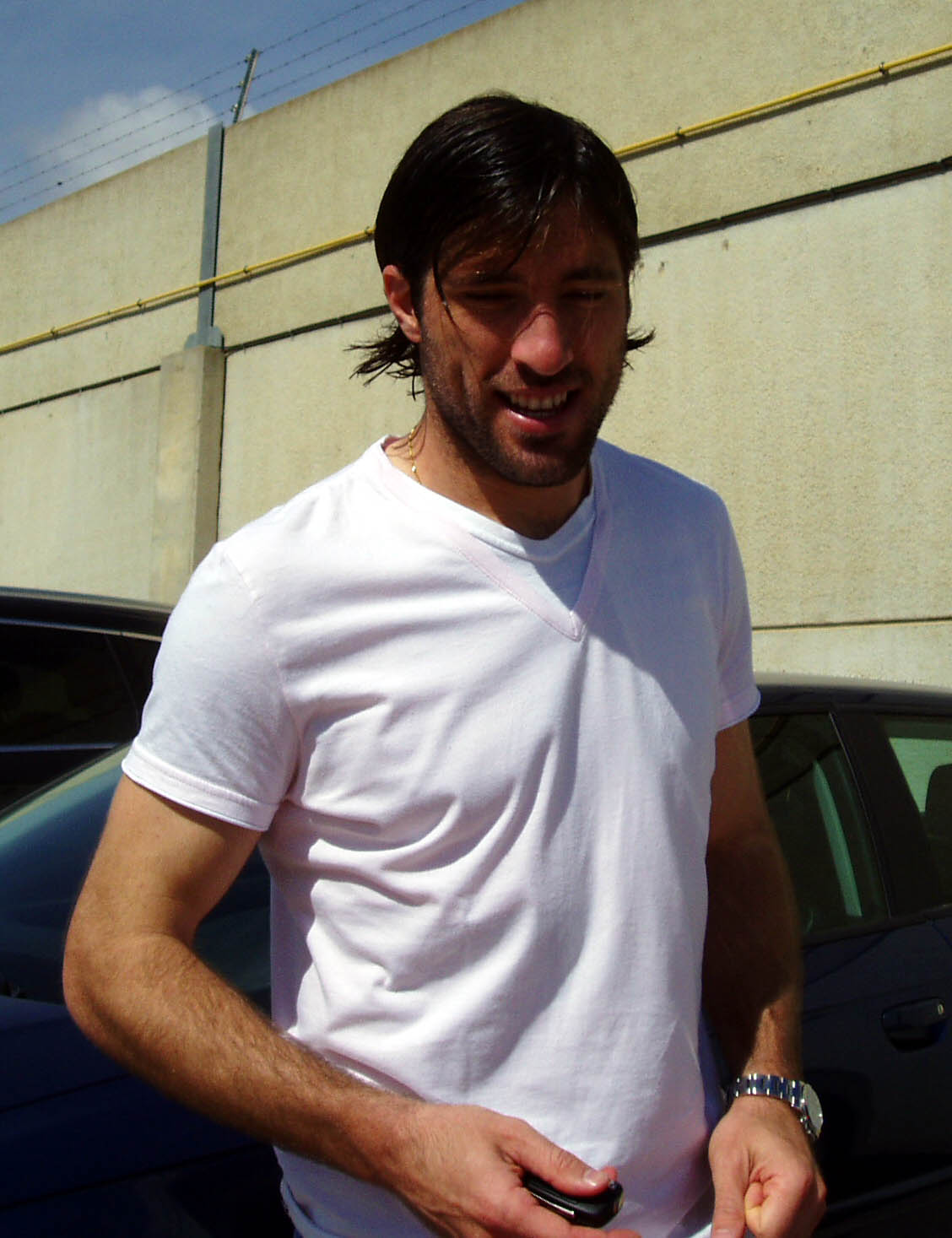
- Pavone in 2008

Personal information
- Full name: Hugo Mariano Pavone
- Date of birth: 27 May 1982 (age 44)
- Place of birth: Tres Sargentos, Argentina
- Height: 1.77 m (5 ft 10 in)
- Position: Striker

Team information
- Current team: Quilmes
- Number: 10

Youth career
- Boca Juniors
- 1996–2000: Estudiantes

Senior career*
Years	Team	Apps	(Gls)
2000–2007	Estudiantes	172	(51)
2007–2011	Betis	76	(16)
2010–2011	→ River Plate (loan)	34	(10)
2011–2012	Lanús	29	(10)
2012–2015	Cruz Azul	88	(34)
2015	→ Vélez Sarsfield (loan)	15	(6)
2015–2016	Racing Club	14	(2)
2016–2017	Vélez Sarsfield	36	(18)
2017–2019	Estudiantes	42	(7)
2019	Defensor	15	(9)
2020–2023	Quilmes	62	(13)

International career
2007	Argentina	1	(0)
- * Club domestic league appearances and goals as of 15:37, 26 July 2022 (UTC)

Hugo Mariano Pavone (born 27 May 1982) is an Argentine former professional footballer who last played for Quilmes Atlético Club as a striker.

== Club career ==
=== Estudiantes ===
Born in Tres Sargentos, Buenos Aires Province, Pavone left his childhood club Boca Juniors at the age of 14, and went on to feature for Estudiantes de La Plata in the Argentine Primera División during seven years (11 comprising youth). His first notable achievement there was scoring 16 goals in the 2005 edition of the Clausura, being crowned the competition's top scorer; furthermore, he was the joint top scorer of the 2006 Copa Libertadores with five goals.

Pavone was selected by sports newspaper Olé as the best player in the 2006 Apertura tournament, where he helped Estudiantes win the championship playing 17 games and scoring 11 goals. These included his team's first and last goals of the tournament, against Quilmes Atlético Club and his "alma mater" Boca Juniors respectively; he also excelled at assisting his teammates, as in the fifth goal against Club de Gimnasia y Esgrima La Plata in a 7–0 win on 15 October derby (in which he also netted once).

=== Betis ===
Pavone signed for Real Betis in late June 2007. The player, who was on his honeymoon in the city of Seville, was purchased by for €6.8 million, becoming the first signing under compatriot Héctor Cúper's management.

Pavone's competitive debut came in La Liga on 26 August, as he played the full 90 minutes in a 1–1 draw at Recreativo de Huelva. In his first two seasons he failed to impress, but had a good run from November 2007–January 2008, when he netted six goals in five matches, including braces against Real Zaragoza (a 2–1 win, as a late substitute) and UD Almería (a 3–1 victory).

Pavone only scored twice in the 2008–09 season, and Betis returned to the second division after nine years. He was supposed to sign for Calcio Catania in Italy on 1 February 2010 but, due to Ewerthon's refusal to sign with the Andalusians in order to take his place, the deal was cancelled.

=== Return to Argentina ===
On 23 July 2010, Club Atlético River Plate and Betis arranged a one-year loan deal for Pavone, who returned to his country after three years. He scored five goals in the Apertura, helping the club climb out of the relegation zone.

River, however, would be scheduled to appear in the relegation playoffs against Club Atlético Belgrano. On 26 June 2011, after a 0–2 away loss, he scored in the first minutes of the game but also had a penalty saved by Juan Carlos Olave, in an eventual 1–3 aggregate defeat which sent the historical Buenos Aires team to the second level for the first time in its history.

On 5 August 2011, Pavone signed for Club Atlético Lanús on a free transfer. He made his debut on the 16th against Club Atlético Independiente, coming in at the 27th minute of the second half and scoring the game's only goal in injury time.

Pavone had a good run in the second semester, netting seven times in the 2012 Clausura and another four in the 2012 Copa Libertadores.

=== Cruz Azul ===
In June 2012, Pavone joined Cruz Azul in the Liga MX, helping to the conquest of two major titles in two years, including the 2013–14 edition of the CONCACAF Champions League where he scored his team's only goal in the finals and was awarded the Golden Ball.

=== Back to Argentina ===
On 13 January 2015, Club Atlético Vélez Sarsfield signed Pavone on loan. In June, after his contract expired, he rejected an offer from his first club Estudiantes and joined Racing Club de Avellaneda.

After five months at the Estadio Presidente Juan Domingo Perón, Pavone returned to Vélez for the 2016 season.

=== Later career ===
In July 2017, Pavone rejoined Estudiantes. He made his league debut in his second spell on 29 August, playing the entire 2–1 home victory over Arsenal de Sarandí.

On 22 May 2019, having contributed to a 5–1 defeat of Sarmiento de Resistencia in the round of 64 of the Copa Argentina, Pavone scored his 70th competitive goal for Los Pincharratas. On 25 June, the 37-year-old moved to Defensor Sporting of the Uruguayan Primera División after agreeing to a one-and-a-half-year contract.

== International career ==
Pavone played one game for the Argentina national team, against Chile on 18 April 2007.

== Personal life ==
Pavone's older brother, Gonzalo, was also a footballer and a striker. He played for nearly 15 clubs during his career, also competing in Spain (lower leagues exclusively).

== Club statistics ==
As of 20 February 2016

Season	Country	Club	Appearances	Goals
2000–01	Argentina	Estudiantes	7	0
2001–02	Argentina	Estudiantes	7	1
2002–03	Argentina	Estudiantes	27	3
2003–04	Argentina	Estudiantes	29	4
2004–05	Argentina	Estudiantes	37	20
2005–06	Argentina	Estudiantes	28	5
2006–07	Argentina	Estudiantes	36	18
2007–08	Spain	Betis	30	9
2008–09	Spain	Betis	18	2
2009–10	Spain	Betis	28	6
2010–11	Argentina	River Plate	32	9
2011–12	Argentina	Lanús	29	10
2012–13	Mexico	Cruz Azul	38	20
2013–14	Mexico	Cruz Azul	35	10
2014	Mexico	Cruz Azul	15	4
2015	Argentina	Vélez Sarsfield	15	6
2015	Argentina	Racing Club	14	2
2016–	Argentina	Vélez Sarsfield	3	2

== Honours ==
=== Club ===
Estudiantes

- Argentine Primera División: 2006 Apertura

Cruz Azul

- Copa MX: 2013 Clausura
- CONCACAF Champions League: 2013–14

=== Individual ===
- Argentine Primera División Top Scorer: 2005 Clausura
- Copa Libertadores Top Scorer: 2006 (joint)
- CONCACAF Champions League Golden Ball: 2014
