= Tercio de Vizcaínos =

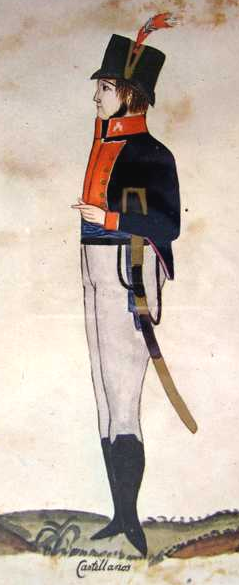
- Official uniform belonging to the 1st company of Vizcaínos Castellanos
- Disbanded: 1809
- Country: Argentina
- Allegiance: Spanish Empire
- Type: Infantry
- Engagements: British invasions of the River Plate; Mutiny of Álzaga

The Tercio de Vizcaínos was a unit of the Buenos Aires militia composed in its majority by volunteers of Basque, Castilian and Asturian origin. This infantry unit was established after the first British invasion of the River Plate in 1806.

== History ==
The Tercio de Vizcaínos was created on September 8, 1806, and was formed with a company of militiamen from Cantabria, under the command of Prudencio Murguiondo, five companies of Vascos and Navarros, and two militia companies formed by volunteers from Asturias. The Vizcaínos also had a Cuerpo de Cazadores Correntinos, composed of sixty-seven soldiers under the Captain Juan José Blanco.

Prudencio Murguiondo and Miguel Cuyar, Captain of the 8th Compañía de Asturianos, were distinguished by the Supreme Junta of Seville on behalf of Fernando VII of Spain, for their actions in the recapture of Buenos Aires from the British.

The Tercio de Vizcaínos was dissolved in 1809, after its members took part in the Mutiny of Álzaga against the Viceroy Santiago de Liniers.
