= Banco Español del Río de la Plata =

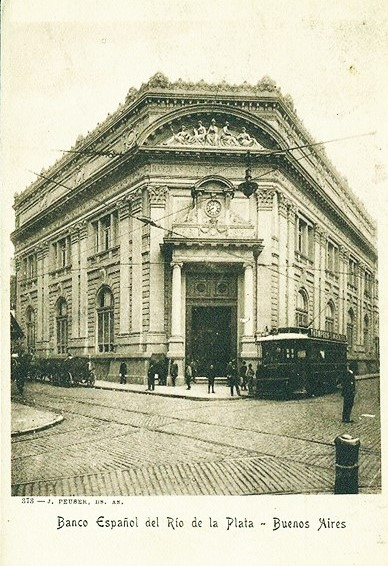
- facade of the Banco de Español del Río de la Plata, c. 1910
- Industry: Banking and Financial services
- Founded: 1886
- Defunct: 1983
- Headquarters: Buenos Aires, Argentina
- Area served: Buenos Aires

Banco Español del Río de la Plata (in English: Spanish Bank of the Río de la Plata) was an Argentine bank which operated in Buenos Aires between 1886 and 1983.

== History ==
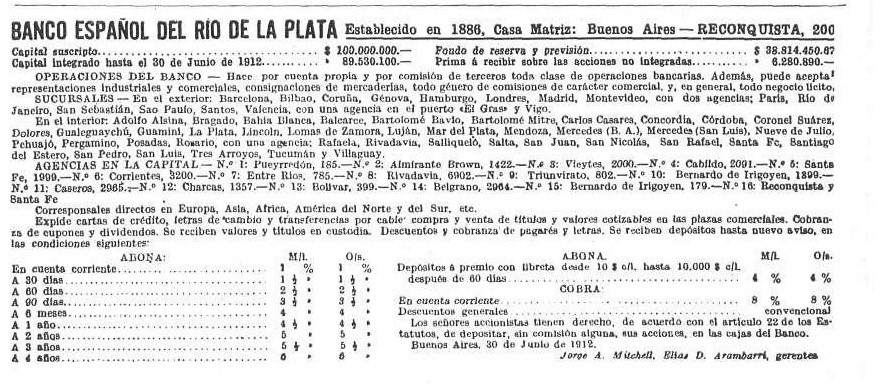
Advertisement of the Banco Español del Río de la Plata in the magazine Caras y Caretas

The Bank was founded in 1886 by Augusto J. Coelho, born in Montevideo, Uruguay. This entity was also in charge of Jorge A. Mitchell, who served as Manager of The Banco Español and Río de la Plata for several years.

Originally its building was located on the Calle de la Piedad (current Bartolomé Mitre), neighborhood of San Nicolás. In 1905 a new building was built by the architect Carlos Agote, located at the intersections of Reconquista and Cangallo (Buenos Aires). Its original headquarters was acquired by Banco Galicia in 1988, who demolished the original building in 2001.

The Banco Español del Río de la Plata had branches in several European cities, including Barcelona, Madrid (Caryatid Building) and London. It was merged with the Banco Comercial del Norte in 1983.

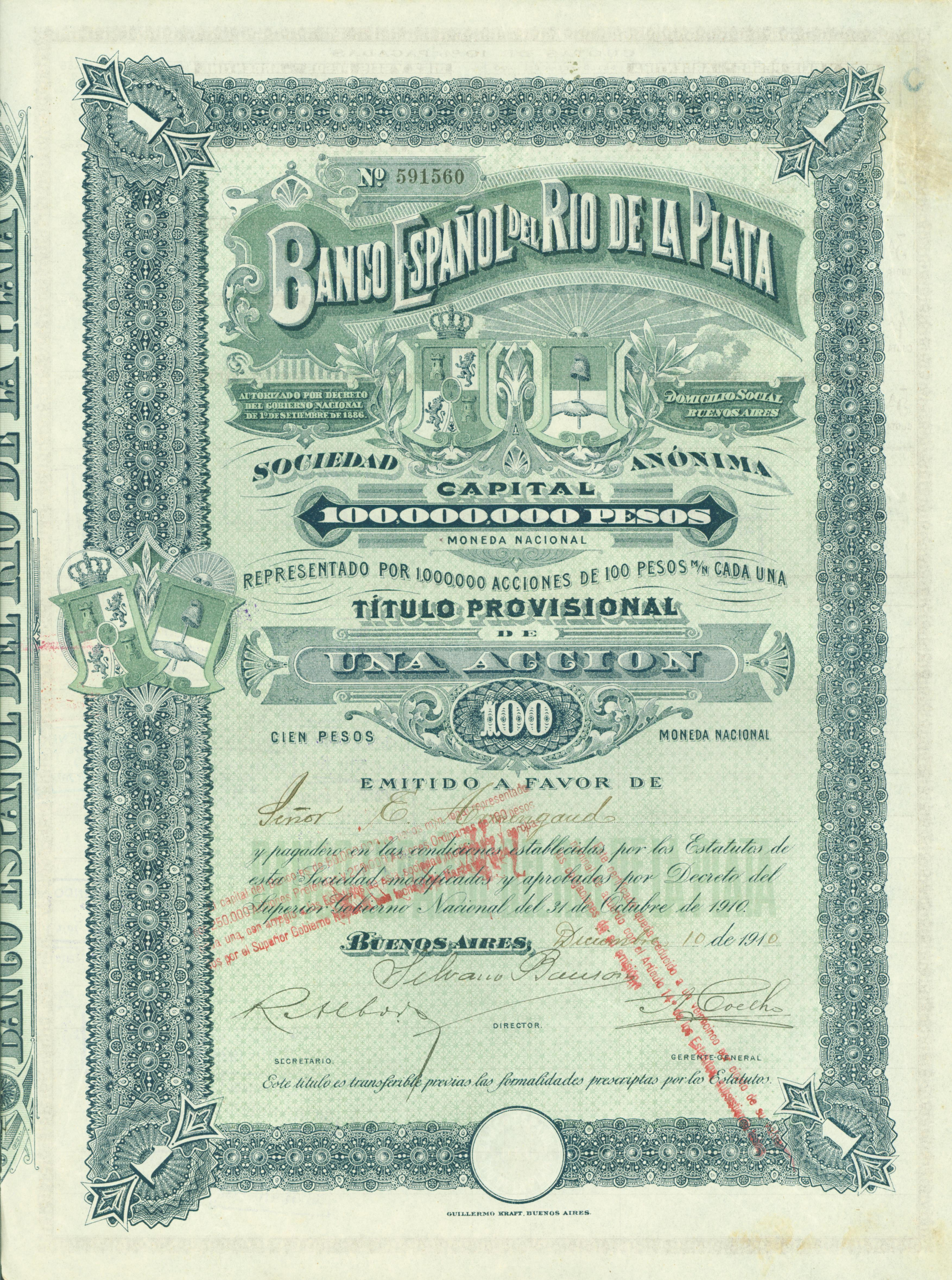
Share of the Banco Español del Río de la Plata, issued 10 December 1910]

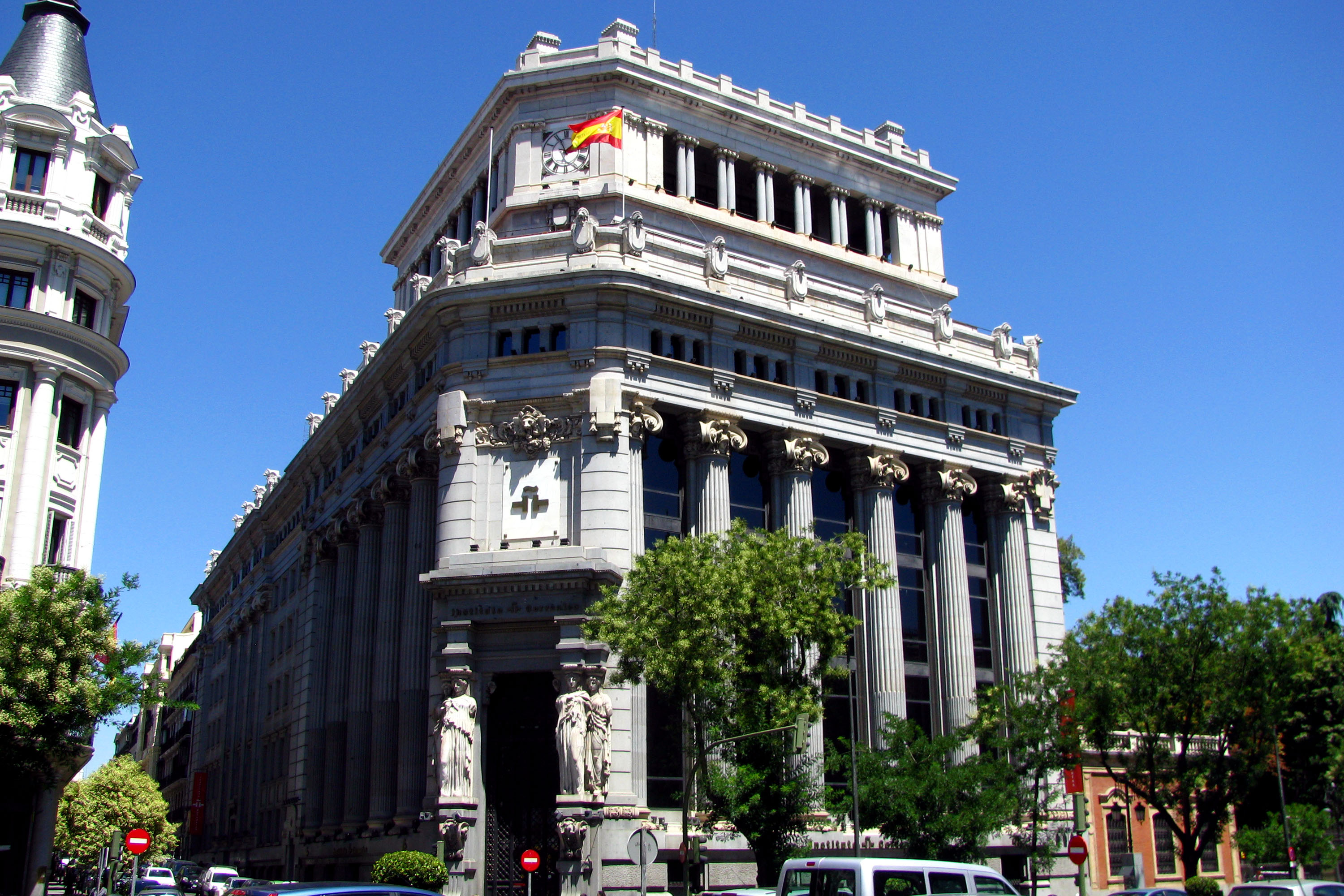
The bank's building in Madrid

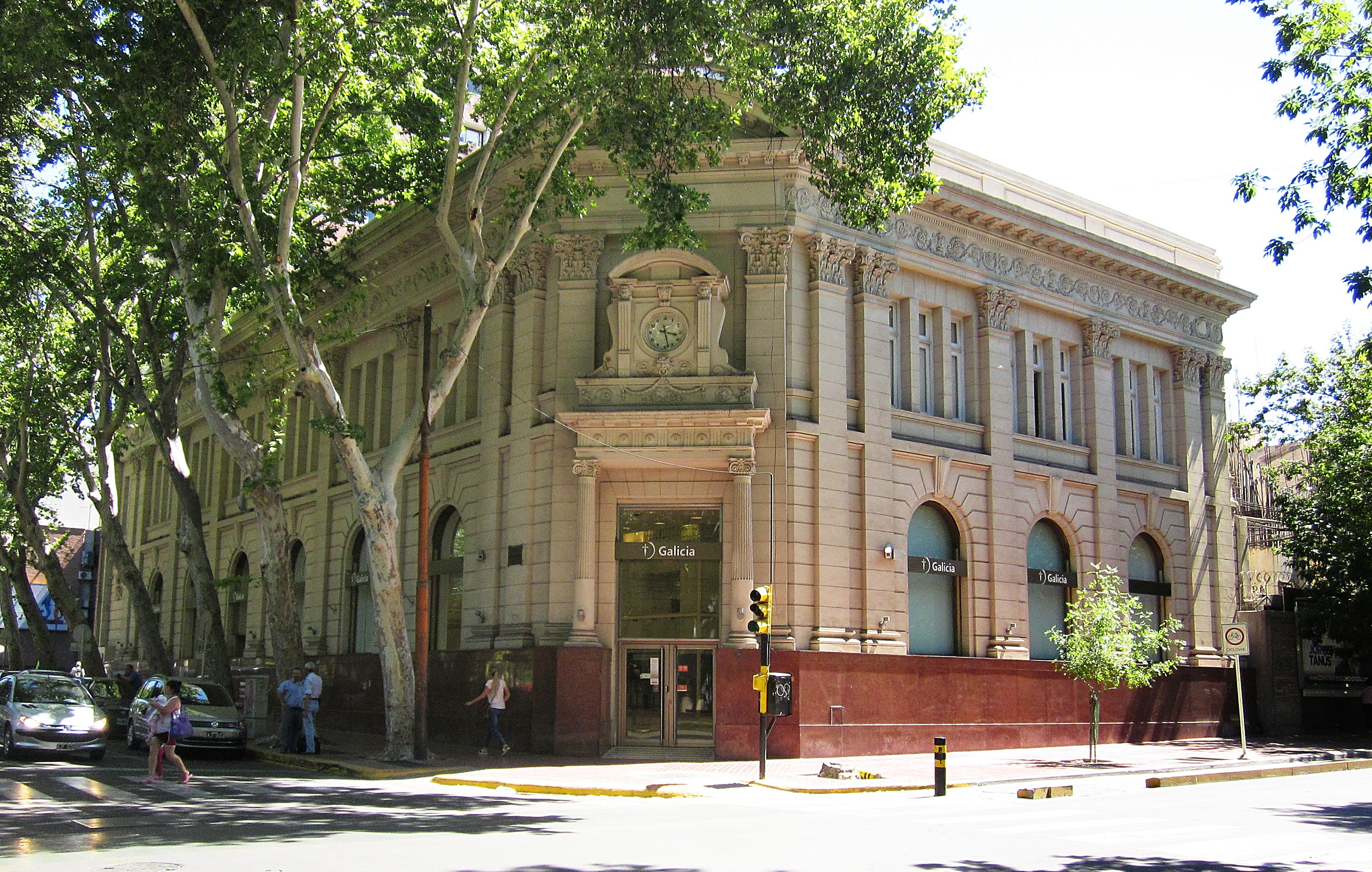
Branch building in Mendoza, Argentina

== See also ==
- Banco Transatlántico
