= Carmen de Areco =

Town in Buenos Aires Province, Argentina

- Town
- Location in Argentina
- Coordinates: 34°23′9″S 59°49′46″W
- Country: Argentina
- Province: Buenos Aires
- Partido: Carmen de Areco
- Founded: 1780

Population (2001 census [INDEC])
  - Total: 12,008
- CPA Base: B 2273
- Area code: +54 6727

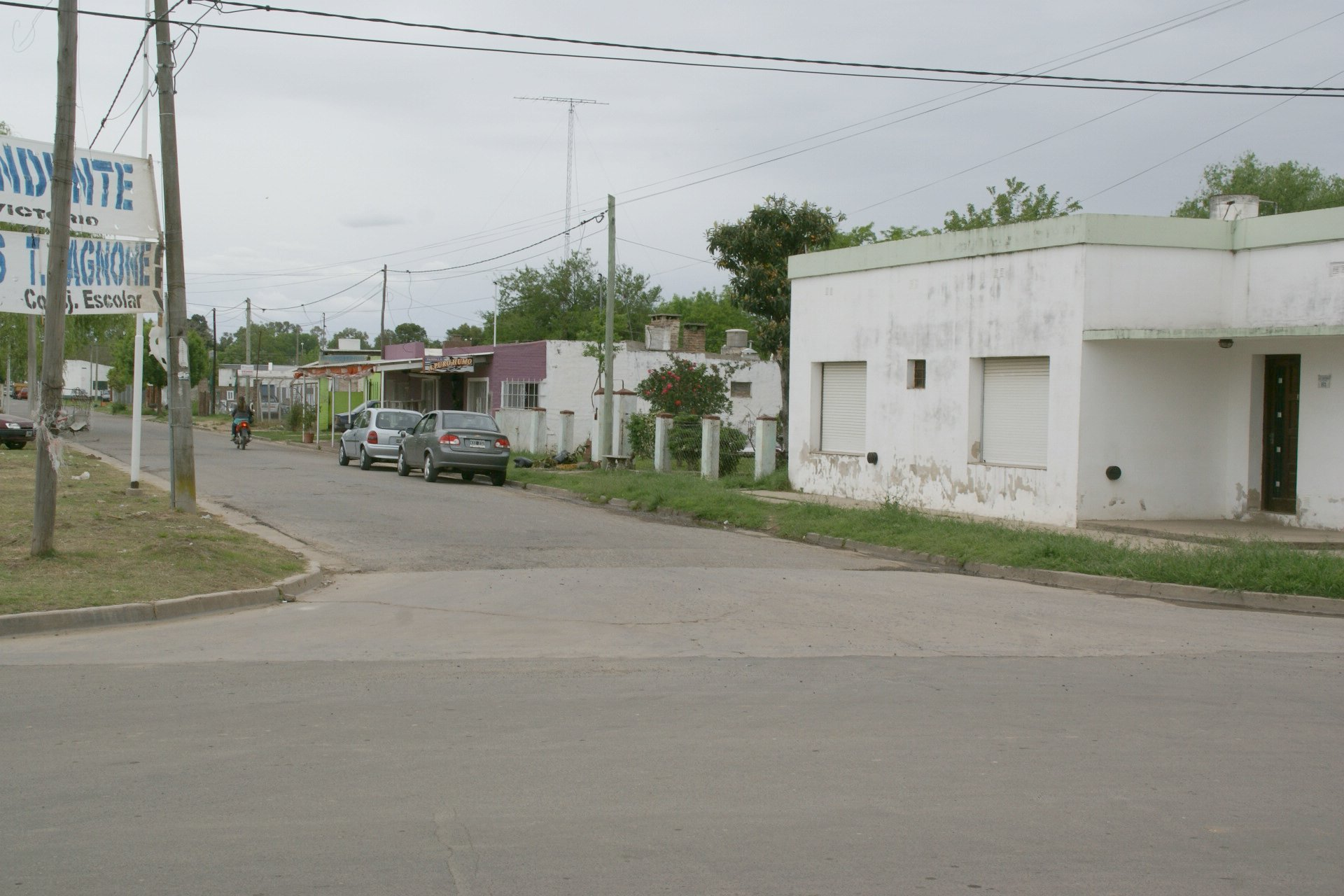
A street in Carmen de Areco

Carmen de Areco is a town in Buenos Aires Province, Argentina. It is the administrative centre for Carmen de Areco Partido.

== History ==
In 1779, Viceroy Vértiz ordered Lieutenant Colonel Francisco Bergezé de Ducás to reinforce the line of defence against the native Argentine aborigines. On January 1, 1780, Juan José Sardén officially established the fort and village of "San Claudio de Areco". On September 26, 1812, Carmen de Areco Partido was officially founded. 1857, the name of the town officially changed to "Carmen de Areco". On 24 October 1864, the settlement was declared a town (municipalidad) by provincial law Ley No. 422.

Carmen de Areco was since the colonial period, residence of a large number of Irish immigrants, including the prisoners of the English Invasions. The first families of Irish immigrants, mostly Catholics, were arrived in the town of Areco, around 1840.

These Irish people were engaged in rural tasks, raising livestock and agriculture, including their participation in politics as Miguel Duffy, belonging to a family of Leinster, who served as mayor of Carmen de Areco for several periods.

The Parish of Nuestra Señora del Carmen was established in 1815, and the St. Patrick Parish of Areco, towards the end of the 19th century.

In 1907, the train station was built in the English Colonial style, and on January 22, 1908, the first passenger service arrived in the town.
