= British invasions of the River Plate =

Battles during the Anglo-Spanish War of 1796–1808

- Part of Anglo-Spanish War (1796–1808)
- William Beresford surrenders to Santiago de Liniers (1806)
Date	1806–1807
Location	River Plate, Viceroyalty of the River Plate, Kingdom of Spain and the Indies (present-day Argentina and Uruguay)
Result	Spanish victory

Belligerents
Kingdom of Spain and the Indies; Viceroyalty of the Río de la Plata	United Kingdom of Great Britain and Ireland

Commanders and leaders
Rafael de Sobremonte; Santiago de Liniers; Pascual Ruiz Huidobro; Martín de Álzaga; Juan Martín de Pueyrredón	Home Riggs Popham; William Beresford (surrendered); John Whitelocke; Samuel Auchmuty; Charles Stirling; George Murray

Strength
First invasion: ~2,500 soldiers; Second invasion: ~2,000 soldiers in Montevideo; ~7,000–8,000 soldiers in Buenos Aires	First invasion: ~1,668 soldiers; Second invasion: ~6,000 soldiers in Montevideo; ~9,000–12,000 in Buenos Aires

Casualties and losses
First invasion: 205 dead and wounded; Second invasion; 1,500 casualties in Montevideo; 600 killed and wounded in Buenos Aires	First invasion: 157 dead and wounded, 1,300 captured; Second invasion; 600 casualties in Montevideo; 311 killed, 208 missing, 679 wounded, 1,600 captured in Buenos Aires

The British invasions of the River Plate were two unsuccessful British attempts to seize control of the Spanish colony of the Viceroyalty of the Río de la Plata, located around the Río de la Plata in South America – in present-day Argentina and Uruguay. The invasions took place between 1806 and 1807, as part of the Napoleonic Wars, War of the Third Coalition at a time when Spain was an ally of Napoleonic France. In Argentine historiography, the two successive defeats of the British expeditionary forces are known collectively as the Reconquista and the Defensa, respectively.

== Overview ==
The invasions occurred in two phases. A detachment from the British army occupied Buenos Aires for 46 days in 1806 before being expelled. In 1807, a second force stormed and occupied Montevideo, remaining for several months, and a third force made a second attempt to take Buenos Aires. After several days of street fighting against the local militia and Spanish colonial army, in which half of the British forces were killed or wounded, the British were forced to capitulate and withdraw from Montevideo two months later.

The social effects of the invasions are among the causes of the May Revolution. The criollos, who had so far been denied important positions, could get political strength through military roles. The successful resistance with little help from Spain fostered the desire for self-determination. An open cabildo and the Royal Audiencia of Buenos Aires deposed the viceroy Rafael de Sobremonte and designated instead the local popular hero Santiago de Liniers, which was a completely unprecedented action: before that, the viceroy was only subject to the King of Spain himself, and no one from the colonies had authority over him.

== Background ==
River Plate, 1806

Pedro de Mendoza founded the Ciudad de Nuestra Señora del Buen Ayre (The City of Our Lady of the Fair Winds) on 2 February 1536 as a Spanish settlement. The site was abandoned in 1541, but it was re-established in 1580 by Juan de Garay with the name Ciudad de la Santísima Trinidad y Puerto de Santa María del Buen Ayre (City of the Most Holy Trinity and Port of Saint Mary of the Fair Winds), and the city became one of the largest in the Americas. A Portuguese colony was founded at Colonia del Sacramento, on the opposite bank of the Río de la Plata, in 1680. To deter Portuguese expansion, the Spanish founded Montevideo in 1726, and Colonia was finally ceded to Spain under the Treaty of San Ildefonso in 1777, one year after the creation of the Spanish Viceroyalty of the Río de la Plata, the forerunner of modern Argentina.

The South Sea Company was granted trading concessions in South America in the time of Queen Anne, under the Treaty of Utrecht. The British had long harboured ambitions in South America, considering the estuary of the Río de la Plata as the most favourable location for a British colony.

The Napoleonic Wars played a key role in the Rio de la Plata conflict and since the beginning of the European conquest of the Americas, the British had been interested in the riches of the region. The Peace of Basel in 1795 ended the war between Spain and France. In 1796, by the Second Treaty of San Ildefonso, Spain joined France in its war with the United Kingdom, thus giving the United Kingdom cause for military action against Spanish colonies. In 1805 the United Kingdom judged it the right moment after the defeat of the Franco-Spanish fleet at the Battle of Trafalgar. This battle forced Spain to reduce to a minimum its naval communications with its American colonies. Historically, Buenos Aires had been relatively neglected by Spain, which sent most of its ships to the more economically important city of Lima. The last time a significant Spanish military force had arrived in Buenos Aires had been in 1784.

=== British interest in the region ===
Great Britain had long harboured interests in taking control of the region from the Spanish before the invasions. Attempts had been made by the British in past conflicts to establish a foothold in South America, like in the Battle of Cartagena de Indias, at the peak of the War of Jenkins' Ear.

In 1711, John Pullen stated that the Río de la Plata was the best place in the world for making a British colonial trading base. His proposal included Santa Fe and Asunción, and would have generated an agricultural area with Buenos Aires as the main port. Admiral Vernon also declared the benefit of opening markets in those areas in 1741. By 1780 the British government approved a project of colonel William Fullarton to take the Americas with attacks from both the Atlantic (from Europe) and the Pacific (from India). This project was cancelled.

In 1789 war between Great Britain and Spain seemed imminent during the Nootka Crisis. The Venezuelan revolutionary Francisco de Miranda took the opportunity to appear before prime Minister William Pitt with his proposal to emancipate the New World territories under Portuguese and Spanish rule and turn them into a great independent empire governed by a descendant of the Incas. The plan presented in London requested the assistance of Great Britain and the United States to militarily occupy the major South American cities, ensuring that the people would greet the British cordially and would rush to organize sovereign governments. In return for this help, the British would receive the benefits of unrestricted trade and usufruct of the Isthmus of Panama, in order to build a channel for the passage of ships. Pitt accepted the proposal and began to organize the expedition. The Nootka Convention in 1790 ended hostilities, and the Miranda mission was canceled.

Nicholas Vansittart made a new proposal in 1796: the plan was to take Buenos Aires, then move to Chile and attack from there the Spanish stronghold of El Callao in Peru. This proposal was canceled the following year, but was improved by Thomas Maitland in 1800 as the Maitland Plan. The new plan was to seize control of Buenos Aires with 4,000 soldiers and 1,500 cavalry, move to Mendoza, and prepare a military expedition to cross the Andes and conquer Chile. From there, the British would move from sea to seize Peru and then Quito.

All these proposals were discussed in 1804 by William Pitt, Lord Henry Melville, Francisco de Miranda and Sir Home Riggs Popham. Popham did not believe a complete military occupation of South America was practical but argued for taking control of key locations to allow the main objective, to open new markets for the British economy. Although there was consensus for weakening Spanish control over its South American colonies, there was no agreement as to the system and the moment to take such action. For instance, it was not even agreed whether the cities be turned into British colonies after their capture or just be made into British protectorates.

== First invasion ==
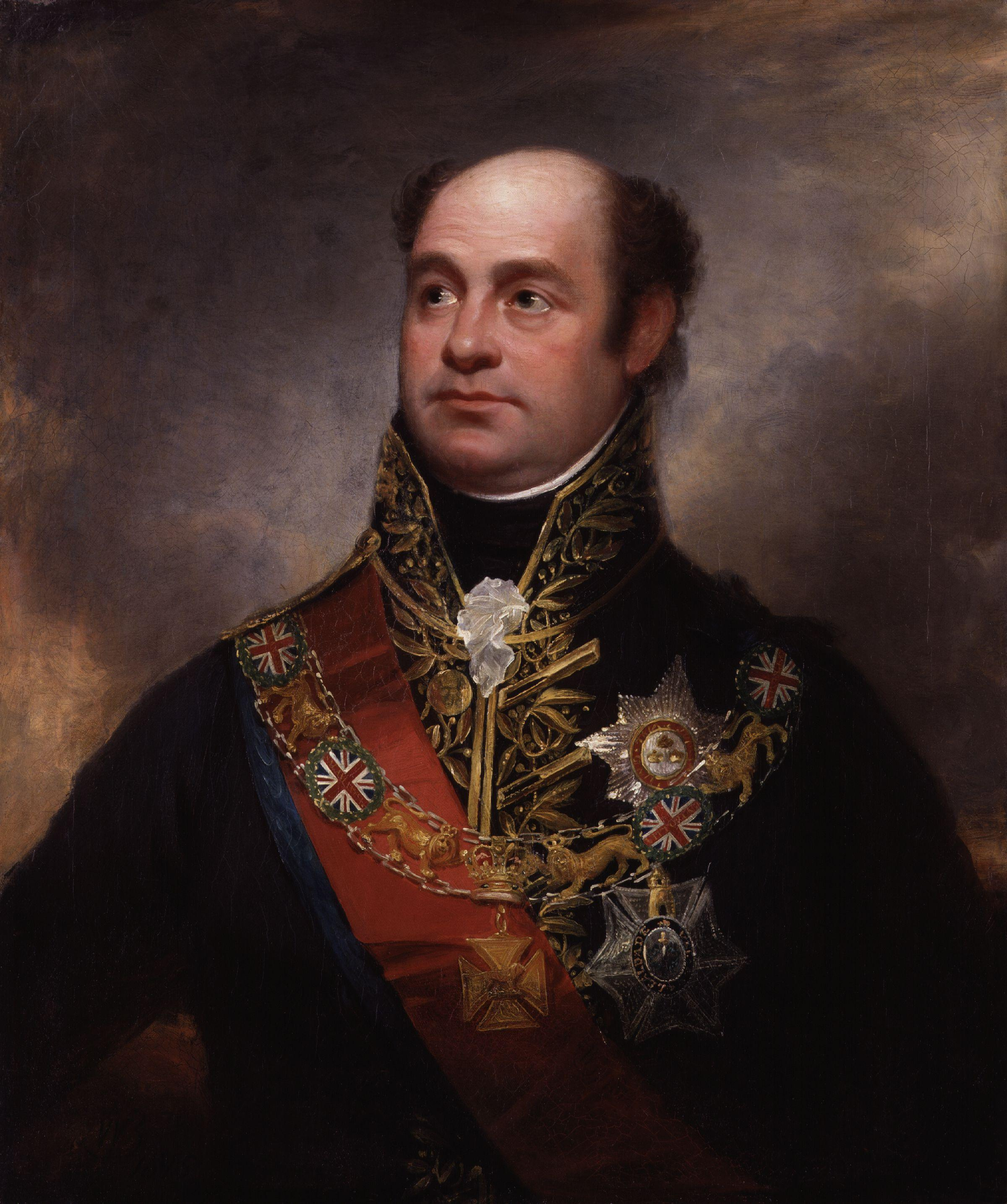
Sir William Beresford, commander of the British troops. Portrait of Lord Beresford by William Beechey, 1815

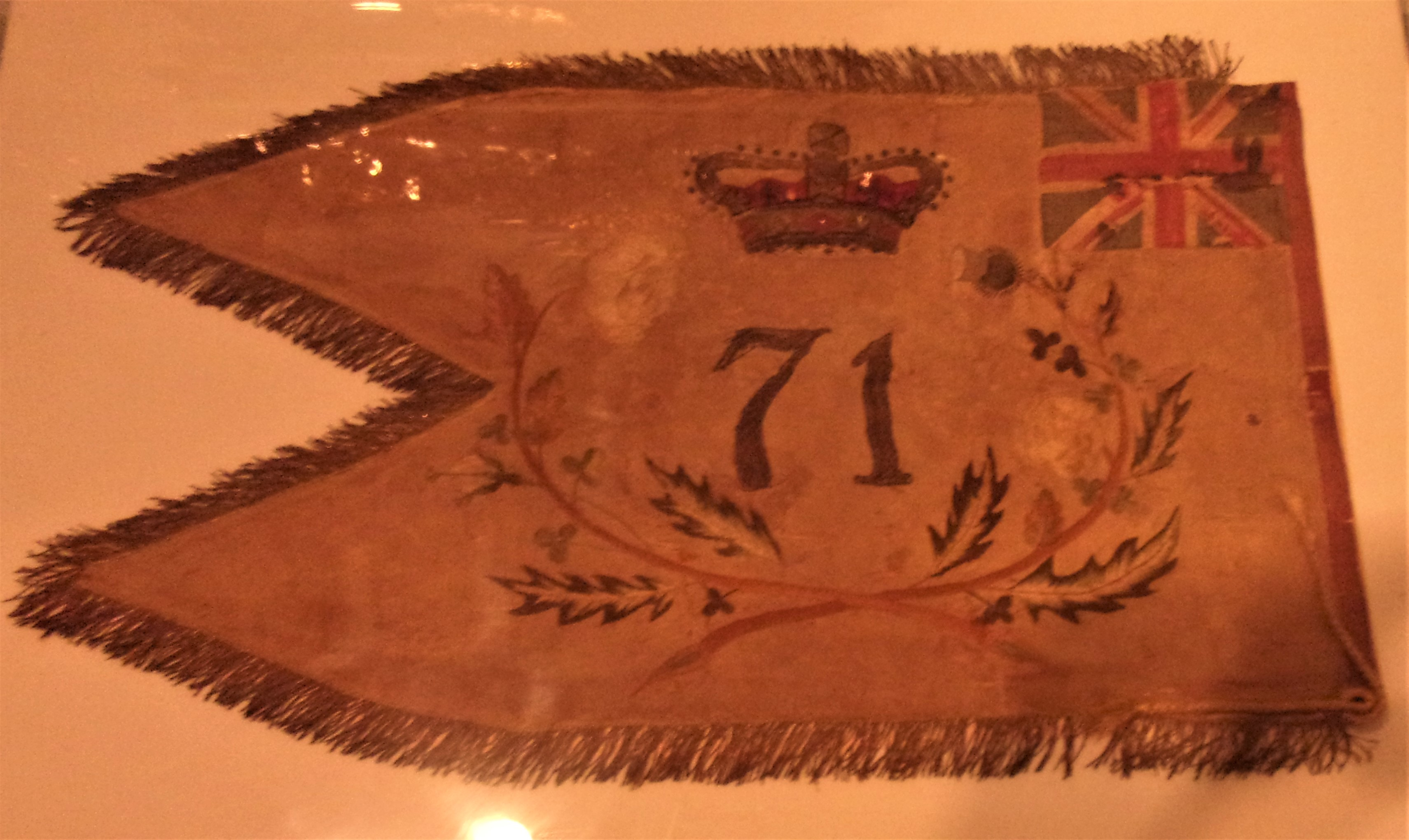
71st Regiment of Foot Colour, captured by the Spanish forces during the first battle of Buenos Aires

In 1805 Popham received orders to escort the David Baird-led expedition against the Dutch colony of the Cape of Good Hope, which was allied with Napoleon. With nearly 6,300 men they took it in January 1806. Popham received new orders from the admiralty to patrol the east coast of South America, from Rio de Janeiro to the Río de la Plata, in order to detect any attempt to counterattack the Cape. However, Popham had the idea of taking the Río de la Plata with a military action similar to the one made at the Cape. His agent William White had informed him about the local politics of the city, such as the discontent among some groups about the restrictive regulations enforced by Spain about international commerce. Popham manifested Baird his will to take the zone, with or without his help. Baird gave him the 71st Regiment of Infantry, artillery and 1,000 men to attempt the invasion. Baird promoted William Carr Beresford to general and designated him vice governor of the zone if it was taken. The expedition got reinforcements of 300 men from the Artillery and [St Helena] Regiment.

The Spanish Viceroy, Marquis Rafael de Sobremonte, had asked the Spanish Crown for reinforcements many times, but only received a shipment of several thousand muskets and instructions to form a militia. Buenos Aires was then a large settlement housing approximately 45,000, but the Viceroy was reluctant to give weapons to the Creole population. The best troops had been dispatched to Upper Peru, present-day Bolivia, to guard the frontiers from Túpac Amaru II's revolt, and when Sobremonte learned of the British presence in the area he dispatched the remaining troops to Montevideo, considering that the attack would be in that city. Thus, the British found Buenos Aires almost defenseless.

The British took Quilmes, near Buenos Aires, on 25 June 1806, and reached and occupied Buenos Aires on 27 June. The Viceroy fled to Córdoba with the city's treasury, but lost it to British forces during his escape. Although his action was in line with a law enacted by former Viceroy Pedro de Cevallos, which required the treasury to be kept safe in case of a foreign attack, he was seen as a coward by the population because of it.

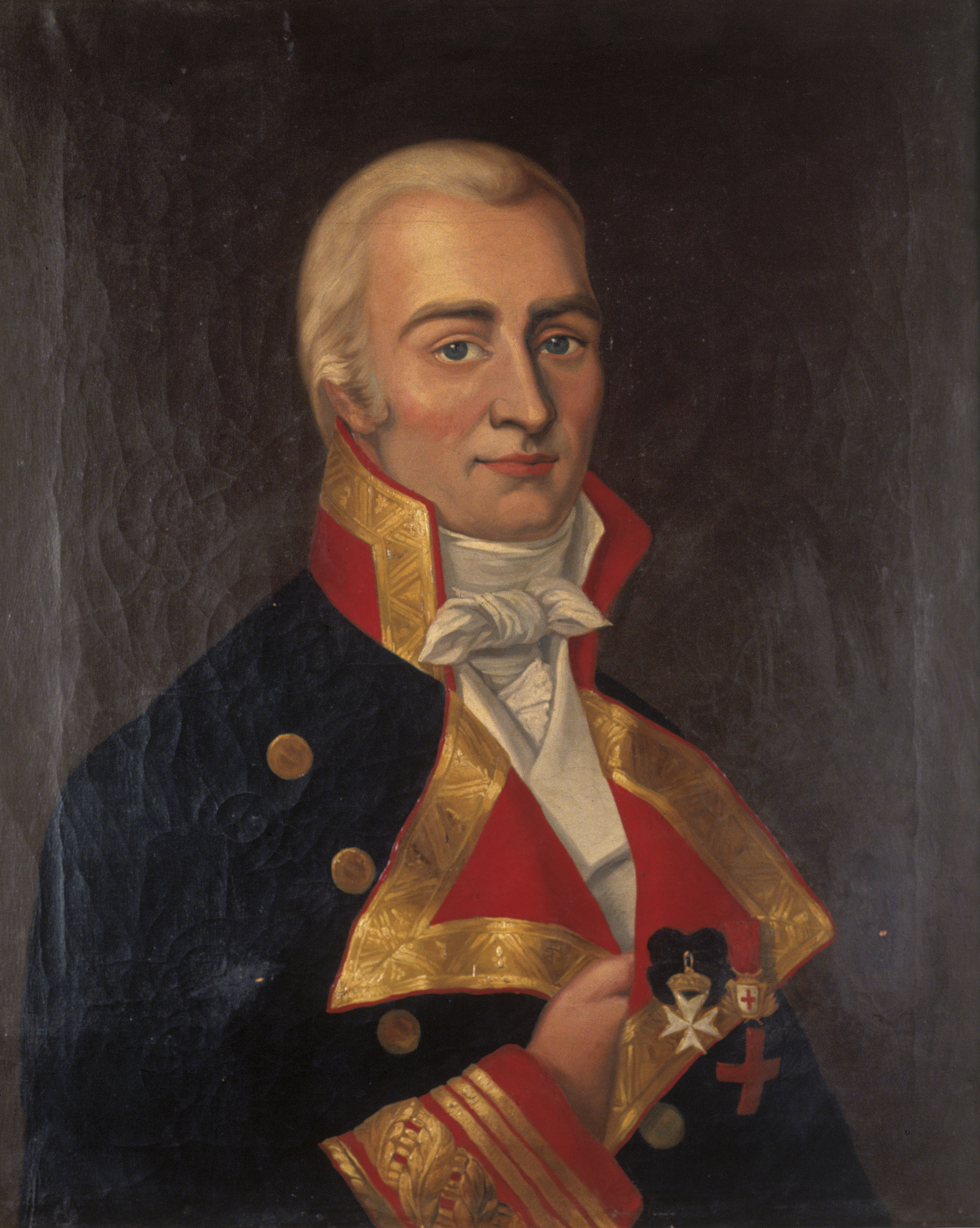
Portrait of Don Santiago de Liniers. Naval Museum of Madrid.

Initially the British forces were met with a lukewarm welcome by the residents of the city, with some wealthy families throwing feasts in honour of the British officers. Nevertheless, some political figures remained antagonistic. Manuel Belgrano said "Queremos al antiguo amo o a ninguno" (we want the old Master or none at all) before leaving to Uruguay. Religious leaders swore loyalty as well, after the promise that the Roman Catholic religion would be respected. The Royal Audience ceased its activities. Some merchants were displeased by the repeal of the Spanish monopoly and the opening to British trade, as it harmed their interests; one of their leaders was Martín de Álzaga.

Juan Martín de Pueyrredón organised a militia near the city, but was discovered before being ready, and his troops were defeated. Santiago de Liniers, who was assigned to guard a nearby coast defense, got into the city and weighed the situation. He convinced Álzaga to hold on his plan, and moved to Montevideo. The governor Pascual Ruiz Huidobro gave him command of 550 veterans and 400 soldiers to return to Buenos Aires and attempt the re-conquest. Sobremonte was doing the same in Córdoba, but Liniers got to Buenos Aires first.

On 4 August 1806, Liniers landed at Las Conchas, north of Buenos Aires, and advanced with a mixed force of Buenos Aires line troops and Montevideo Militia toward the city. On 10 August he took control of the strategic points of Miserere and El Retiro, holding the north and west entries to the city. Beresford finally surrendered on 14 August. An open cabildo decided afterwards to depose Sobremonte from having military authority, and giving such authority, instead, to the victorious Liniers. Sobremonte would not return to Buenos Aires, and moved to Montevideo instead. The open cabildo also decided to prepare the city against the possibility of a British counter-attack.

Foreseeing the possibility of a second invasion, militias were formed by the Spanish and criollos, such as the Patricios, Arribeños, Húsares (of Pueyrredón), Pardos and Morenos. The creation of such local forces created concern within the Spanish elite, fearful of an attempt of secession from the Spanish Crown.

On this first invasion, the 71st Regiment of Foot lost both of its Regimental Colours during the combat, which are currently held in Argentina. On the second invasion, there was a frustrated attempt to recover both flags. They were retaken by the Buenos Aires militia and returned to the Santo Domingo convent.

== Second invasion ==
=== Battle of Montevideo ===
Lieutenant-General John Whitelocke, commander of the British forces in the second invasion.

On 3 February 1807 Montevideo, defended by approximately 5,000 men, was besieged at 2:00am by a 15,000 strong British force in a joint military and naval operation under General Sir Samuel Auchmuty and a naval squadron under Admiral Sir Charles Stirling. Reinforcements for the defenders came en route from Buenos Aires, so that the rapid success of the operation was essential.

Swiftly breached, the city was then assaulted by the 40th regiment and the elite 95th (Rifle) regiment. Once inside the walls, the British met heavy resistance as the Spanish fought to halt their advance, but they gradually spread out and forced back the defenders. On the other side of the city a second assault was launched, spearheaded by the 87th Regiment of Foot taking the Spanish defenders in the rear. The Spanish Governor Ruiz Huidobro accepted Auchmuty's demand of unconditional surrender around 5:00 a.m. The Spanish took 600 casualties and a further 2,000 were taken prisoner while the British had taken 600 casualties.

On 10 May, Lieutenant-General John Whitelocke arrived in Montevideo to take overall command of the British forces – this had about 13,000 soldiers, due to the losses suffered in Montevideo – on the Río de la Plata, landing on 27 June.

=== Second Battle of Buenos Aires ===
On 1 July, the force led by Liniers engaged the British but was overwhelmed by superior numbers at Miserere, in the city environs. At this crucial moment, Whitelocke did not attempt to enter the city, but twice demanded the city's surrender. Meanwhile, Buenos Aires' mayor Martín de Álzaga organised the defence of the city by digging trenches, fortifying buildings and erecting fences with great popular support for the Creoles hungered for independence. Finally, three days after forcing the troops under Liniers to retreat, Whitelocke resolved to attack Buenos Aires. Trusting in the superiority of his soldiers, he divided his army into 12 columns and advanced without the protection of the artillery. His army was met on the streets by a mixed-race militia, including 686 African slaves, stiffened by the local 1st Naval Infantry Battalion and 1st 'Patricios' Infantry Regiment, and fighting continued on the streets of Buenos Aires on 4 July and 5 July. Whitelocke underestimated the importance of urban combat, in which the inhabitants employed cooking pots filled with burning oil and boiling water from rooftops, injuring several soldiers of the 88th Regiment. The locals eventually overwhelmed the British troops. The British suffered more than 1,000 casualties.

By the end of 5 July 1807, the British controlled Retiro and Residencia at the cost of about 70 officers and 1,000 other ranks killed or wounded, but the city's centre was still in the hands of the defenders, and the invaders were now demoralized. At this point, a counter-attack by the militias and colonial troops present, defeated many important British commanders, including Robert Craufurd and Denis Pack. Then Whitelocke proposed a 24-hour truce, which was rejected by Liniers, who ordered an artillery attack.

After suffering 311 killed, 679 wounded and 1,808 captured or missing, Whitelocke signed an armistice with Liniers on 12 August; the local marines playing an important part in defeating Brigadier-General Robert Craufurd and his two thousand troops at the Battle of Plaza del Mercado which is now recalled by the people of Buenos Aires as 'The Defence'. In the confusion of defeat, many British soldiers deserted their units and more than 50 were returned to the British and were court-martialed, while others were allowed to stay and would form part of the 1,200-strong British contingent that would help in the liberation of Chile. Whitelocke left the Río de la Plata basin taking with him the British forces in Buenos Aires, Montevideo, and Colonia, but leaving behind 400 seriously wounded. On his return to the United Kingdom, he was court-martialled and cashiered, mainly for surrendering Montevideo. There was much criticism in the British newspapers in the way Whitelocke had conducted himself, and for having surrendered to a largely militia force. Whitelocke would claim that in the 71st Regiment of Foot alone there were 170 deserters. Liniers was later named Viceroy of the Río de la Plata by the Spanish Crown.

The failure of the expedition resulted in the capitulation of several high-ranking British officers who would later achieve prominence in the Napoleonic Wars. Figures such as Denis Pack and Robert Craufurd experienced multiple surrenders—first at the reconquest of Buenos Aires in 1806, and subsequently after the failed assaults of July 1807. Pack's departure from his designated confinement zone in Luján prior to the second campaign became a point of severe contention regarding military honor and parole agreements between British command and the local Río de la Plata authorities.

Uruguayan journalist Juan José de Soiza Reilly claimed in a 1939 article that hundreds of British dead are buried in a mass grave under passageway 5 de Julio, adjacent to Santo Domingo friary, near Avenida Belgrano in downtown Buenos Aires. Santo Domingo friary was the site of the last stand of the British Expedition.

In commemoration of the 1806 victory and, by extension, of the campaign as a whole, 12 August is celebrated in Argentina as the day of the "Reconquista de Buenos Aires".

== Towards independence ==
Coat of arms of Santiago de Liniers, 1st Count of Buenos Aires, which he used as viceroy of the Río de la Plata. Observe the six flags captured from the British during the British Invasions.

After having to fight the British invasions by themselves with little direct help from Spain that at the moment was involved in the Napoleonic Wars, the seeds of independence in Argentina were starting to grow among the Criollos. Local militia battalions being commanded mostly by revolutionaries (like Cornelio Saavedra, Manuel Belgrano, Esteban Romero, Juan Martín de Pueyrredón, Juan José Viamonte and Martín Rodriguez) also contributed to the growth of revolutionary zeal. In 1808, Napoleon placed his brother Joseph Bonaparte on the throne of Spain giving the chance in 1810 for the May Revolution to take place, as a prelude to the Declaration of Independence of Argentina of 1816.

== See also ==
- Argentine War of Independence

== Bibliography ==
- Hughes, Ben (2014). The British Invasion of the River Plate 1806–1807 : How the Redcoats Were Humbled and a Nation Was Born. South Yorkshire, UK: Pen & Sword Book Ltd. ISBN 978-178-159-066-9.
- Fletcher, Ian (2006). The Waters of Oblivion: The British Invasion of the Rio de la Plata, 1806–1807. Staplehurst, Kent, UK: Spellmount. ISBN 186-227-342-1.
- Luna, Félix (1994). Breve historia de los Argentinos (in Spanish). Buenos Aires: Planeta / Espejo de la Argentina. ISBN 950-742-415-6.
- Luna, Félix (2003). Los conflictos armados (in Spanish). Buenos Aires: La Nación. ISBN 950-49-1123-4.
