= John Fremantle (British Army officer) =

British army officer

John Fremantle CB
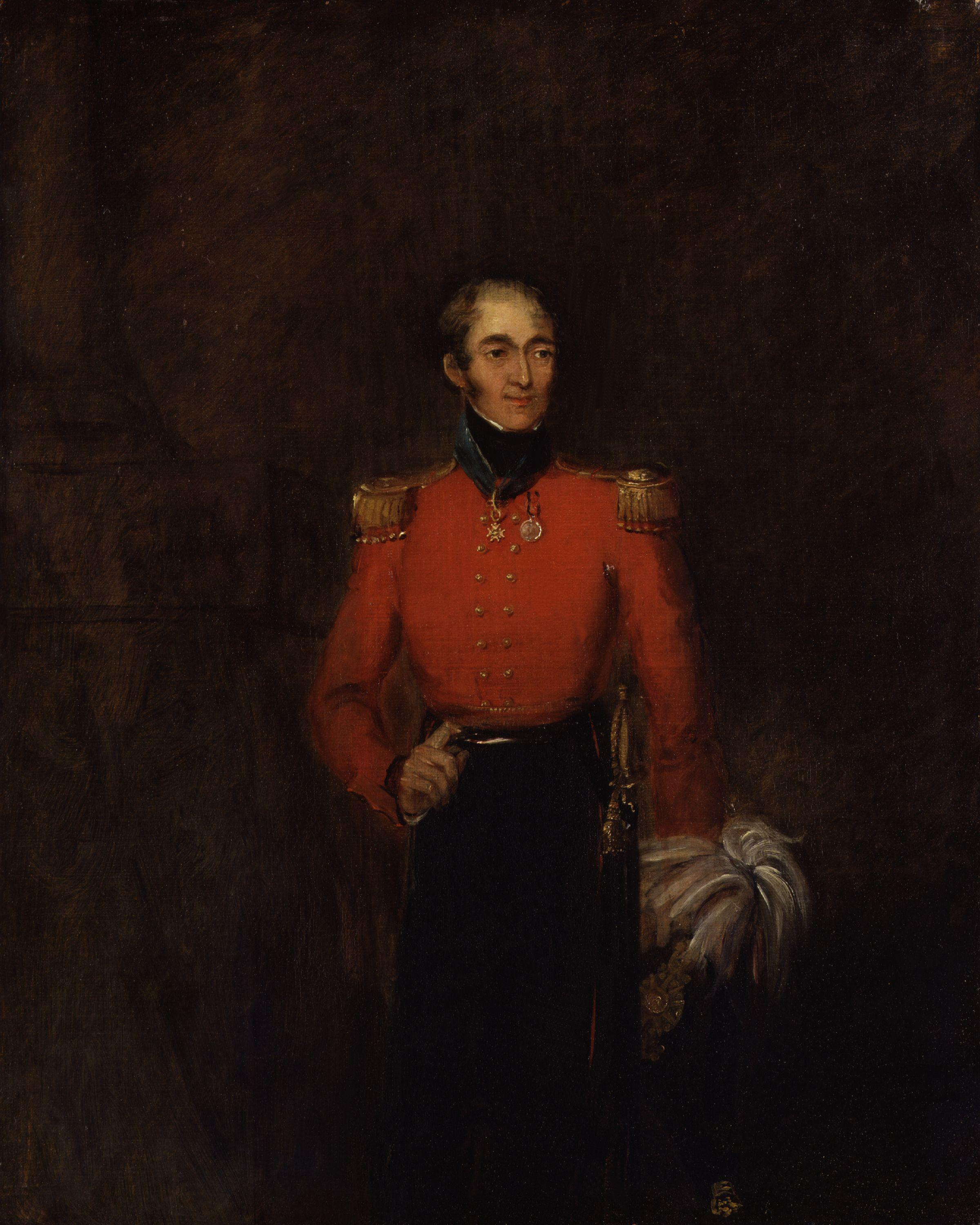
- Portrait by William Salter
- Born: 1790
- Died: 1845 (aged 54–55)
- Education: Royal Military College, High Wycombe; Lüneburg University
- Spouse: Agnes Lyon
- Children: 6, including Arthur Lyon Fremantle
- Relatives: Stephen Fremantle (father); Albinia Jeffrys (mother); William Fremantle (uncle)
- Military career
- Service: British Army
- Rank: Lieutenant-general
- Conflicts: British invasions of the River Plate; Peninsular War; Battle of Waterloo

Lieutenant-general John Fremantle CB (1790–1845) was a British Army officer of the Napoleonic Era.

== Life ==
He was the eldest son of Colonel Stephen Fremantle, by Albinia, daughter of Sir John Jeffrys, Bart., and after his father died when he was four, he was mentored by his uncle William. He joined the 2nd Foot Guards on 17 October 1805 following an education at the Royal Military College, High Wycombe and Lüneburg University. He joined the army in Bremen as an ensign under Lord Cathcart.

He took part in the 1806–07 expedition to seize Buenos Aires from the Spanish Empire as aide-de-camp (ADC) to General John Whitelocke where he was taken prisoner while fighting with the Rifle Corps.

Promoted to Lieutenant and Captain on 2 August 1810, as private secretary he accompanied Lord Howden to Lisbon where he served in most of the actions of the Peninsular War as adjutant until 1812 when he was appointed extra ADC. During the war he carried despatchs to England announcing the battles of Vitoria (1813) and Orthez (1814)

In 1813 he was appointed ADC and private secretary to the Duke of Wellington and was present at the Battle of Waterloo.

After hostilities ceased, Fremantle remained in France with the Army of Occupation and was empowered by the Duke of Wellington to ratify the Convention of St. Cloud on 7 July 1815.

Fremantle died in London in 1854.

== Family ==
On 17 February 1829 he married Agnes, third daughter of David Lyon from whom she inherited £50,000. They had the following issue:

- Arthur Lyon Fremantle (1835–1901) who followed his father into the army and witnessed the Battle of Gettysburg during the American Civil War.
- Fitzroy Fremantle, became a major-general in the British Army and served in Crimea under FitzRoy Somerset, 1st Baron Raglan, after whom he was named.
- Delvin Fremantle, whose daughter Lelia Hope Fremantle married noted admiral Sydney Fremantle.
- John Fremantle
- Augusta Fremantle
- Frances Fremantle

Agnes died in Rome on 20 February 1864.
