= Lewis Lochée =

Military author

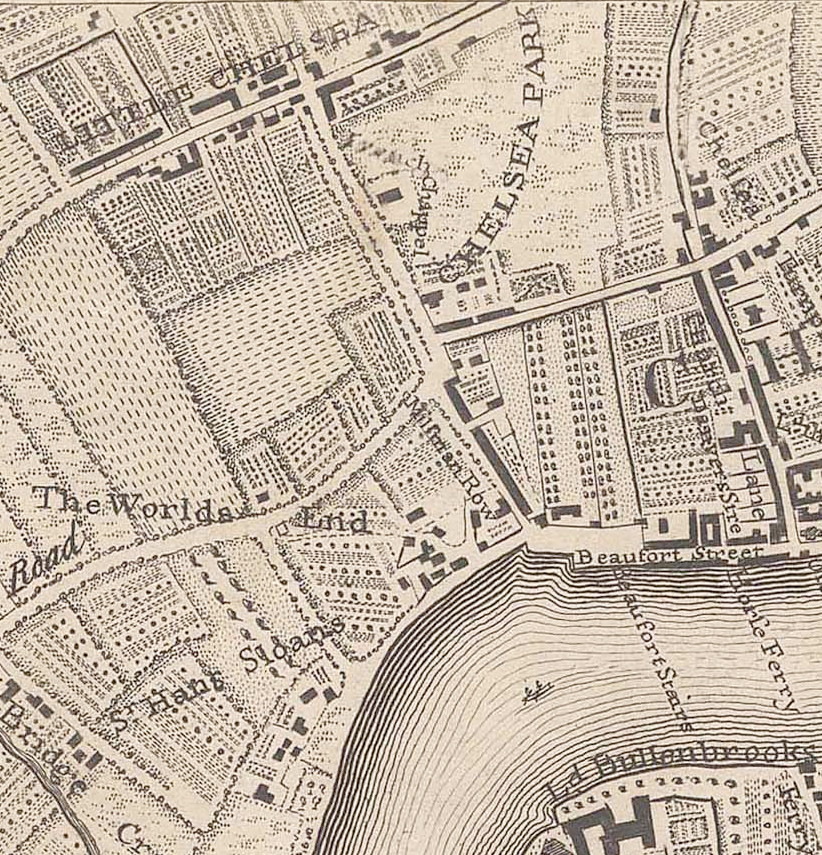
Little Chelsea (top left), in Roque's Map of London, 1746

Lewis Lochée (died 8 June 1791) was a military author born in the Austrian Netherlands. From the early 1770s, he was the proprietor and master of a military academy at Little Chelsea, at that time a rural hamlet near Westminster, in Great Britain.

After closing his academy in 1790, Lochée returned to the Netherlands to fight for the freedom of the Province of Brabant from the Austrians. In 1791, shortly before his death in France, he published a history of the Revolution.

== Early life ==
When Lochée was naturalised as a British subject by an Act of Parliament on 8 May 1780, he said he was the son of John and Theresa Lochée, had been born at Brussels in the Province of Brabant, and had "constantly professed the true Protestant Religion"; apart from this, his origins remain obscure.

== Life in England ==
In the words of the Oxford Dictionary of National Biography entry on Lochée, “It is unknown when or why he moved to England, though he was living in Camberwell, Surrey, in 1767. He was possibly a political exile from Austrian rule and certainly a protestant.“ On 26 August 1767, Lochée married Elizabeth Dubourg at St James's, Westminster.

Lochée owned and occupied property in Chelsea from 1770 until his death, establishing there by 1773 what he called the Royal Military Academy, for the training of infantry and cavalry officers, of which he was Master. There, the sons of gentlemen were taught History, Geography, Tactics, Fortification, Mathematics, Map Reading, Military Sketching, and languages. This was after the foundation in 1741 of the Woolwich Military Academy, which was for training artillery and engineer officers, but long before the establishment in 1801 of the Royal Military College. At a time when most British army officers were trained privately, if at all, Lochée‘s academy taught its students "the Modern Languages and all the Military Sciences."

In 1776 Lochée bought Hollywood Grove, a large brick house at Little Chelsea to the west of Hollywood Road, which had been owned by Henry Middleton, a planter in South Carolina and a landowner in Barbados, the father of Arthur Middleton, one of the signatories of the United States Declaration of Independence, also in 1776. There Lochée continued his academy, and over several years wrote and published books on military education.

On 16 October 1784, from Lochée’s property in Chelsea, there was a pioneering ascent by two balloonists, Jean-Pierre Blanchard and John Sheldon.

Lochée’s notable students included General John Whitelocke (1757–1833).

On 1 March 1790, in The Times, Lochée announced that he had retired and closed his military academy in Chelsea and was selling various effects, including carriages and library bookcases.

== Brabant Revolution ==
After winding up his academy, Lochée fought as an officer in the military campaign of the United Belgian States to free Brabant from Austrian control. On 18 May 1790 he was in command of Belgian forces in a battle at Ychipe. In June, after anonymous attacks were made on him regarding the battle, at Lille in French Flanders he published a 45-page letter setting out his account of what had happened.

In 1791, after the end of the unsuccessful Brabant Revolution, Lochée published two books about it. Shortly afterwards, he died at Lille: his death was recorded in The Gentleman's Magazine of June 1791:

"At Lisle, in Flanders, Lewis Lochee esq. late Lieutenant Colonel of the Belgic Legion, and formerly keeper of the Royal Military Academy at Chelsea".

== Aftermath ==
Probate was granted on Lochée‘s Will dated 28 March 1787, in which he left his property equally between his wife, Elizabeth, and his son John Lochée, a minor.

In 1797 and 1798, Mrs Lochée and her son sold the large site of the former military academy in three parts, but the Lochée family continued owning other investment property in the locality until 1836.

== Selected publications ==
- An Essay on Military Education, by Lewis Lochée, Master of the Military Academy (London: Printed for J. Nource, in the Strand, 1773; reprinted by Kessinger Publishing, 2010, ISBN 978-1165895281)
- Lewis Lochée, A System of Military Mathematics Volume 1 (1776); Volume 2 (1777)
- Lewis Lochée, An Essay on Castrametation (1778)
- Lewis Lochée, Elements of Fortification (1780)
- Lewis Lochée, Elements of Field Fortification: By Lewis Lochee (1783)
- Lewis Lochée, A Monsieur le Baron Schoenfeldt (Lille, 1790)
- Lewis Lochée, Relation de ce qui c’est passé le 18 Mai entre les Autrichiens et les Patriotes, & particuliérement dans l'attaque du Village d‘Ychipe par les Autrichiens (1790)
- Lewis Lochée, Histoire de la derniere révolution Belgique (Lille: J. Roelenbosch, 1791)
- Lewis Lochée, Observations sur la Révolution Belgique, et réflexions sur un certain imprimé adressé au Peuple Belgique, qui sert de justification au Baron de Schoenfeldt, etc. (1791)
