= Hollywood Arms =

Hollywood Arms may refer to:

- Hollywood Arms (play), 2002 play
- The Hollywood Arms, Kensington, pub in London
