= Three Months in the Southern States =

Book by Arthur Fremantle

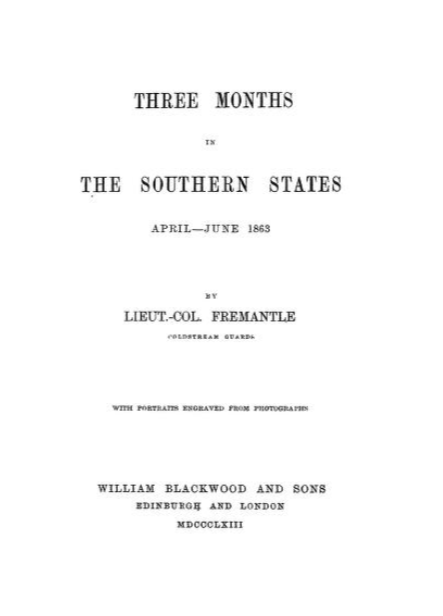
- Title page for Three Months in the Southern States (1863)
- Author: Colonel Arthur Fremantle
- Language: English
- Publisher: University of Nebraska Press; Reprint edition (March 1991)
- Publication date: 1864
- Publication place: United Kingdom
- Pages: 329 pages

Three Months in the Southern States is a book written by British Colonel Arthur Fremantle, of the Coldstream Guards, upon his return to England from his three-months traveling through the Confederacy during the American Civil War in 1863, from April 2 until July 16.

Most specifically mentioned in the book are Fremantle's travels through Texas and the Deep South, and finally – when he arrived at Robert E. Lee's Army of Northern Virginia on June 27, and witnessed the Battle of Gettysburg at first-hand – as part of a cadre of foreign observers attached to the headquarters of Lt. Gen. James Longstreet, in charge of that amy's 1st Corps, and Lee's longest-serving subordinate commander.

When published, the book became a best seller in Great Britain and in America, both North and South, but was then mostly forgotten until its reissue on the eve of the centennial of the Civil War.
