= Hollywood Road, Brompton =

Residential street in London, England

Hollywood Road, Chelsea
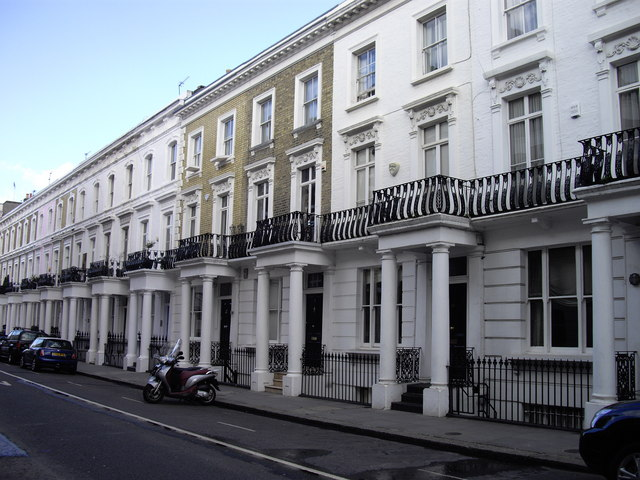
- Houses in Hollywood Road

- Location within Royal Borough of Kensington and Chelsea Location within Greater London

General information
- Location: Hollywood Road, Chelsea, London, England
- Coordinates: 51.4886°N 0.1810°W
- Completed: 1865-1868

Hollywood Road is a residential street in the Brompton area, London, SW10. It runs roughly north to south from Tregunter Road to Fulham Road. The area is now located inside the Boltons Conservation Area, set up in 1970 by the Royal Borough of Kensington & Chelsea. Hollywood Road was put up early in the 1860s, before the more famous Hollywood in California was settled.

== History ==
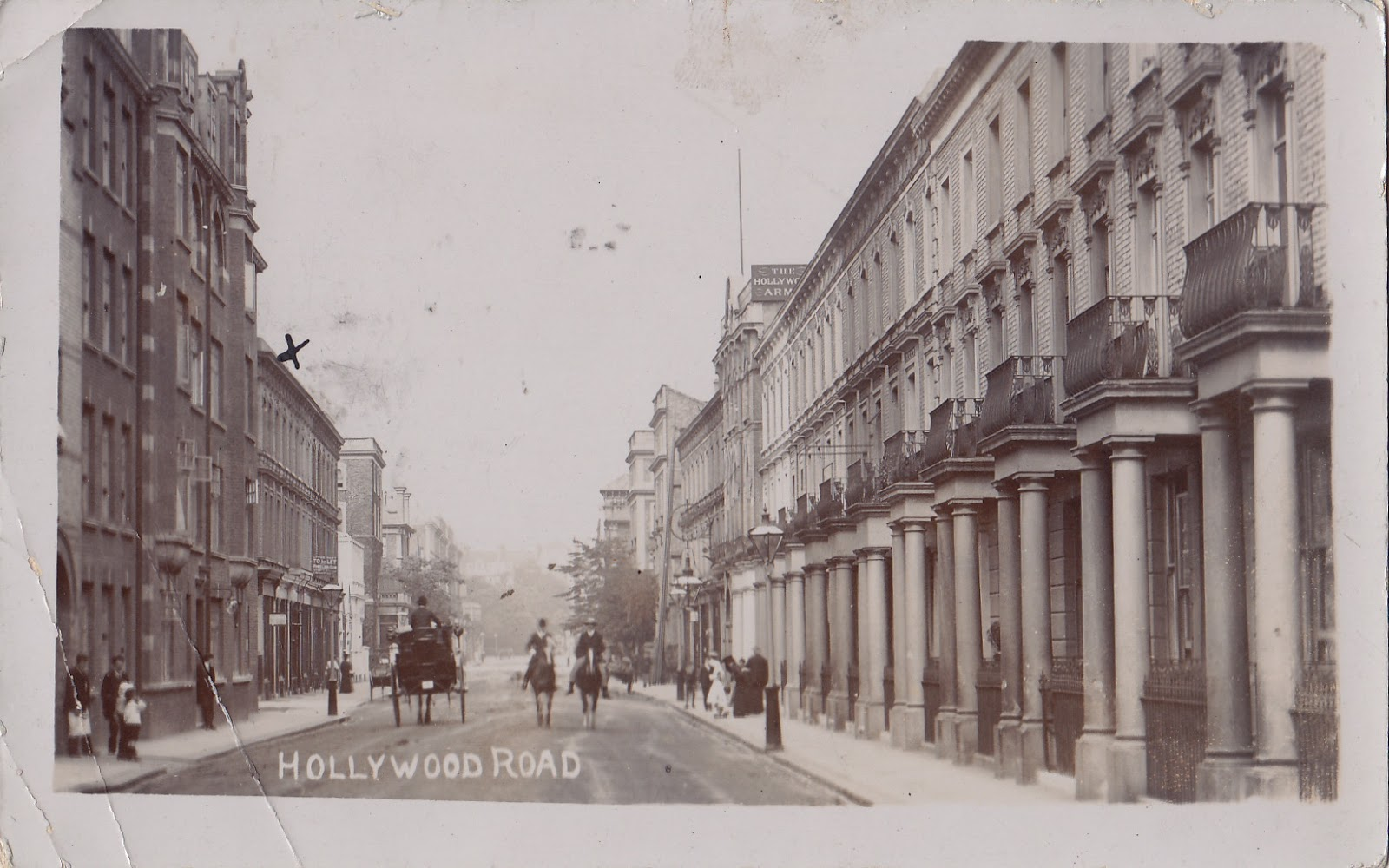
Vintage postcard picturing Hollywood Road (Chelsea, London) in the 1890s

Part of the larger development of the Gunter Estate (of what is now known as the Boltons Conservation Area) between 1850 and 1876, Hollywood Road itself was built between 1865 and 1868. The street mainly contains flat fronted houses with open Doric porches and black painted cast iron balcony railing above.

The main terrace extending to the Hollywood Arms was built under ninety-nine-year leases granted by James Gunter to William Corbett or Alexander McClymont which ran from Christmas 1863. Hollywood Road marked the only place where James or Robert Gunter's building campaigns in Kensington reached the Fulham Road.

== Notable buildings and residents ==
- Hollywood Arms, built in 1865 by builders Corbett and McClymont. Grade II listed building.
