= Royal Military College, High Wycombe =

British military training facility

Coordinates: 51.62900°N 0.74972°W

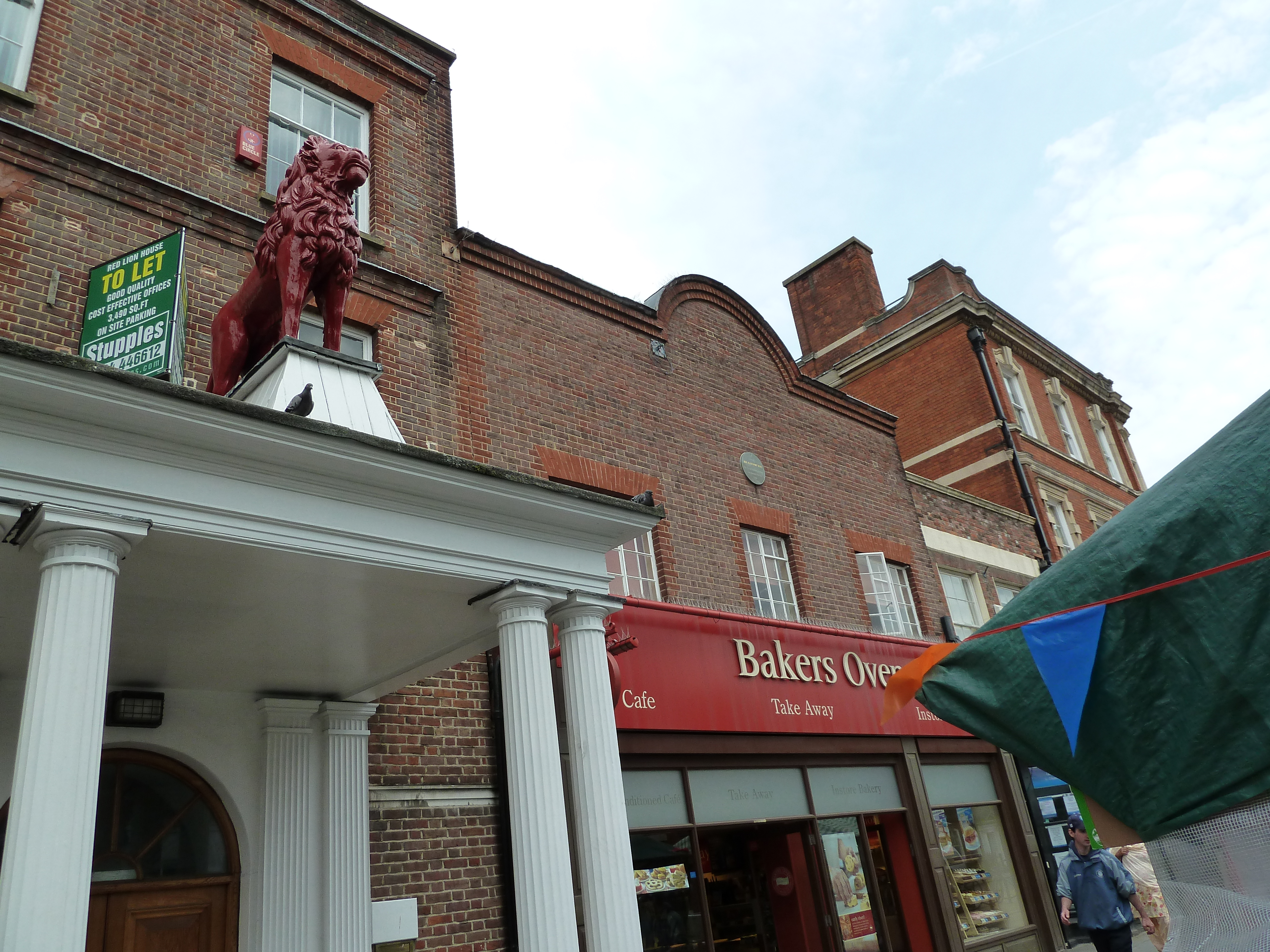
The Royal Military College, High Wycombe (now occupied by a shop)

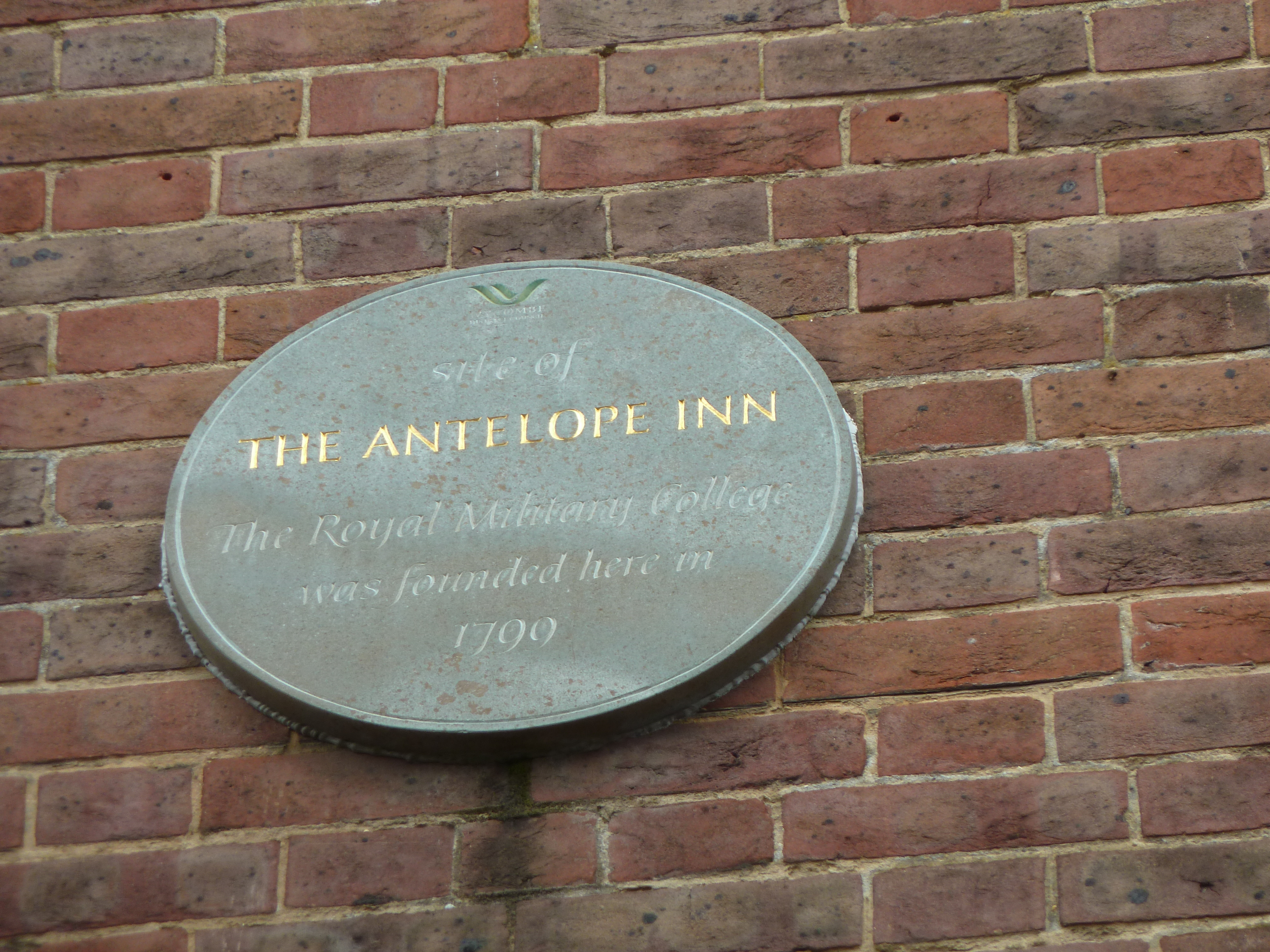
Blue plaque on the front of the building

The Royal Military College, High Wycombe was a military training facility for British Army officers in High Wycombe in Buckinghamshire.

== History ==
The college was founded by Colonel John Le Marchant at the Antelope Inn in 1799 as a facility for training junior officers in the British Army who aspired to staff duties. Training was provided in trigonometry, geometry, French language and siege warfare. The facilities proved too small and the institution moved to a building in West Street in Farnham in 1813 before being redesignated the Senior Division of the Royal Military College, Sandhurst in 1820 and then becoming the Staff College, Camberley in 1858.
