= The Hollywood Arms, Kensington =

Grade II listed public house in London

The Hollywood Arms
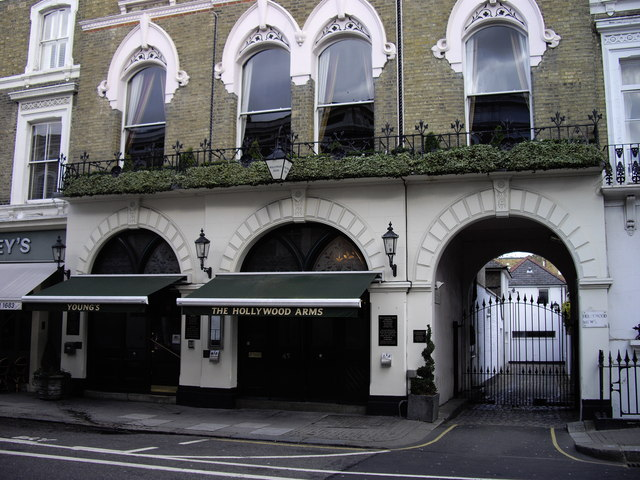
- The Hollywood Arms

- Location within Royal Borough of Kensington and Chelsea Location within Greater London

General information
- Location: Hollywood Road, Kensington, London, England
- Coordinates: 51.4863°N 0.1843°W
- Completed: 1865

Design and construction
- Designations

Listed Building – Grade II
- Official name: Hollywood Arms Public House
- Designated: 7 November 1984
- Reference no.: 1358204

The Hollywood Arms is a Grade II listed public house at Hollywood Road, Kensington, London.

It was built in 1865, and the architect is not known".
