= Royal Military College, Sandhurst =

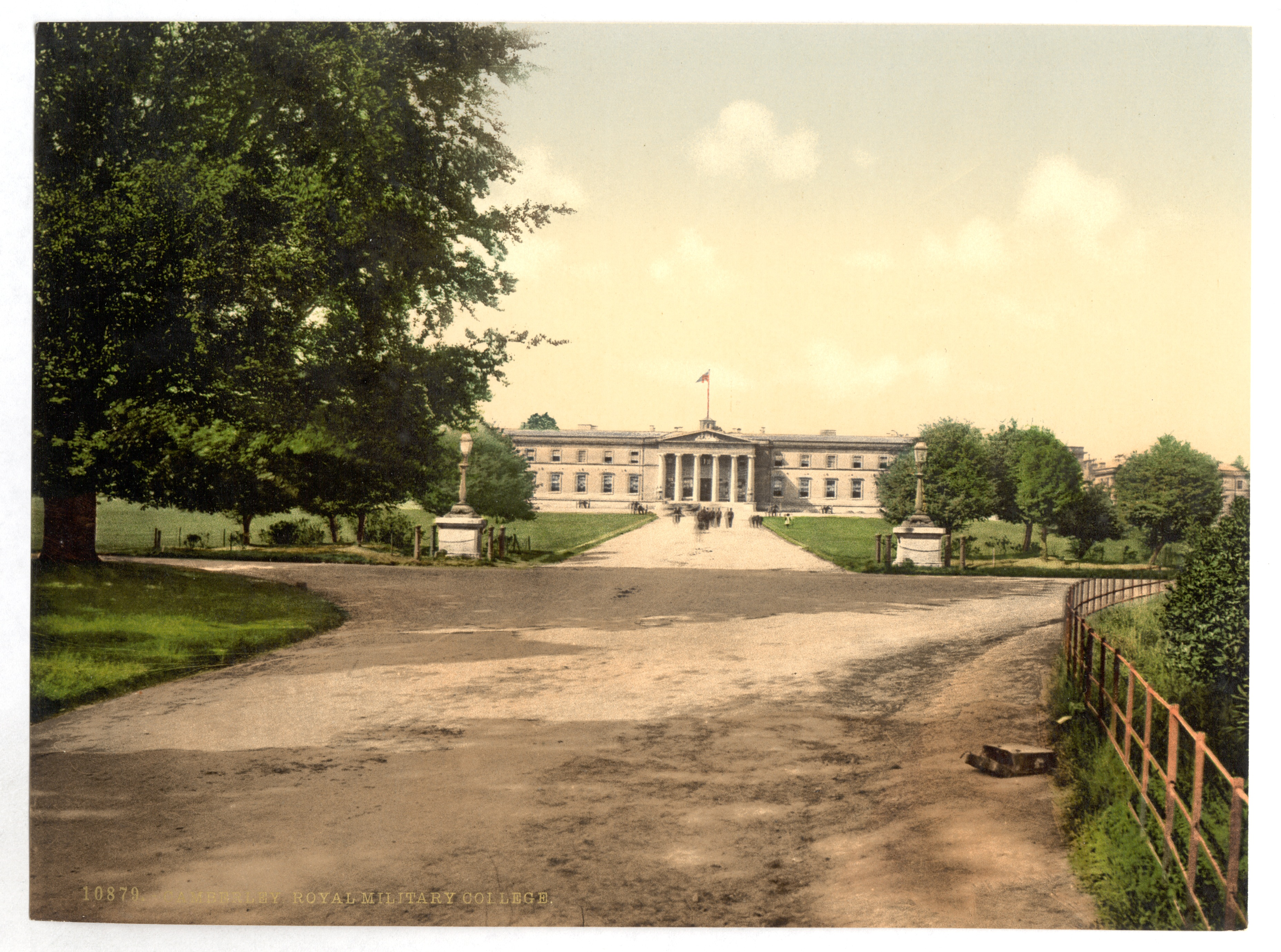
- The Royal Military College, c. 1900
- Active: 1801–1939
- Country: United Kingdom
- Branch: British Army
- Role: Training infantry and cavalry officers
- Garrison/HQ: Sandhurst, Berkshire 51°28′30″N 0°3′27″E

Commanders
- Governors, commandants: List of governors and commandants of Sandhurst

The Royal Military College, Sandhurst (RMCS) was a British military academy for training infantry and cavalry officers of the British and Indian Armies. It was founded in 1801 at Great Marlow and High Wycombe in Buckinghamshire, but moved in October 1812 to Sandhurst, Berkshire.

The RMC was reorganised at the outbreak of the Second World War, but some of its units remained operational at Sandhurst and Aldershot. In 1947, the Royal Military College was merged with the Royal Military Academy, Woolwich, to form the present-day all-purpose Royal Military Academy Sandhurst.

== History ==
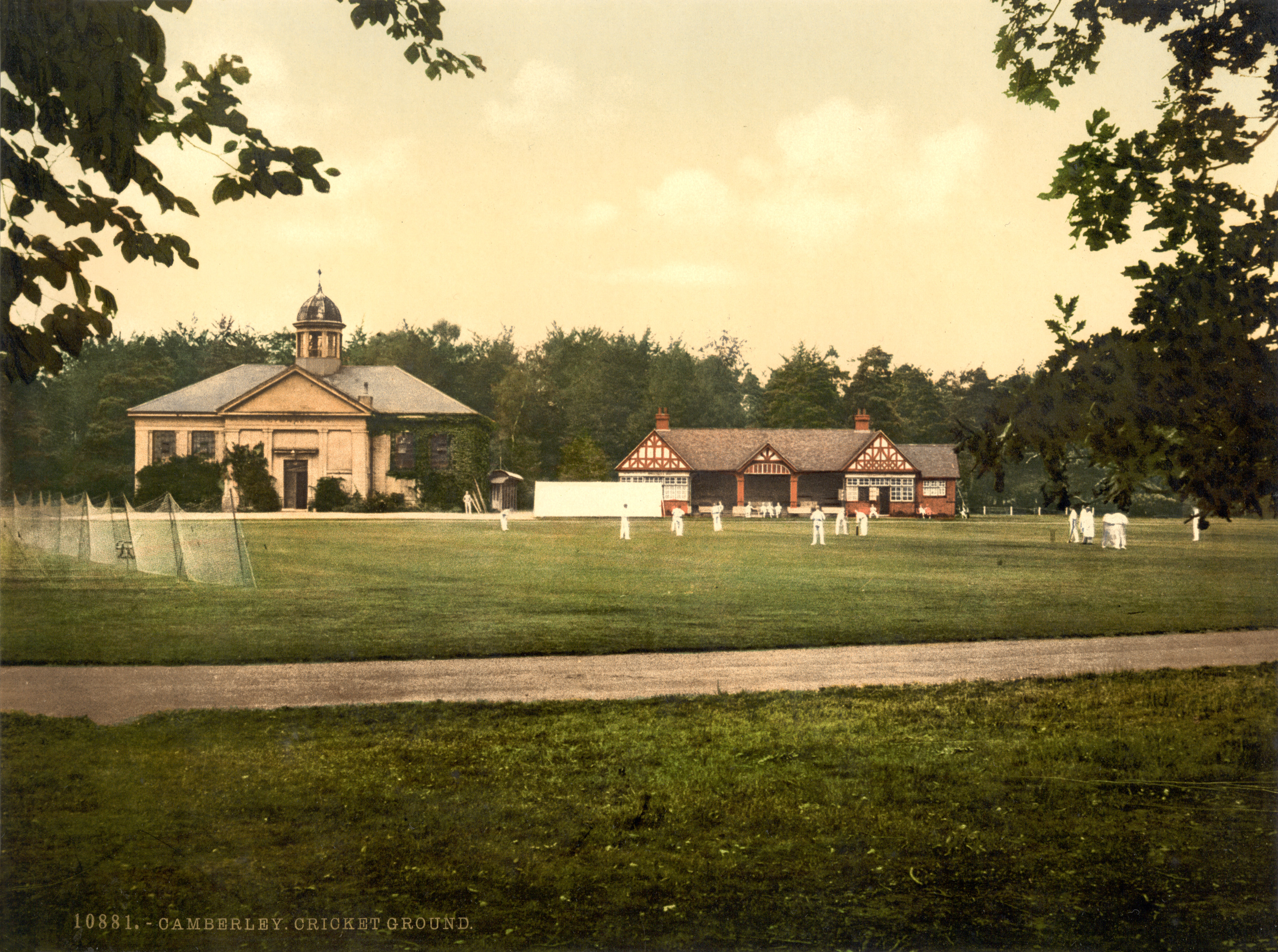
The RMC cricket field, c. 1895

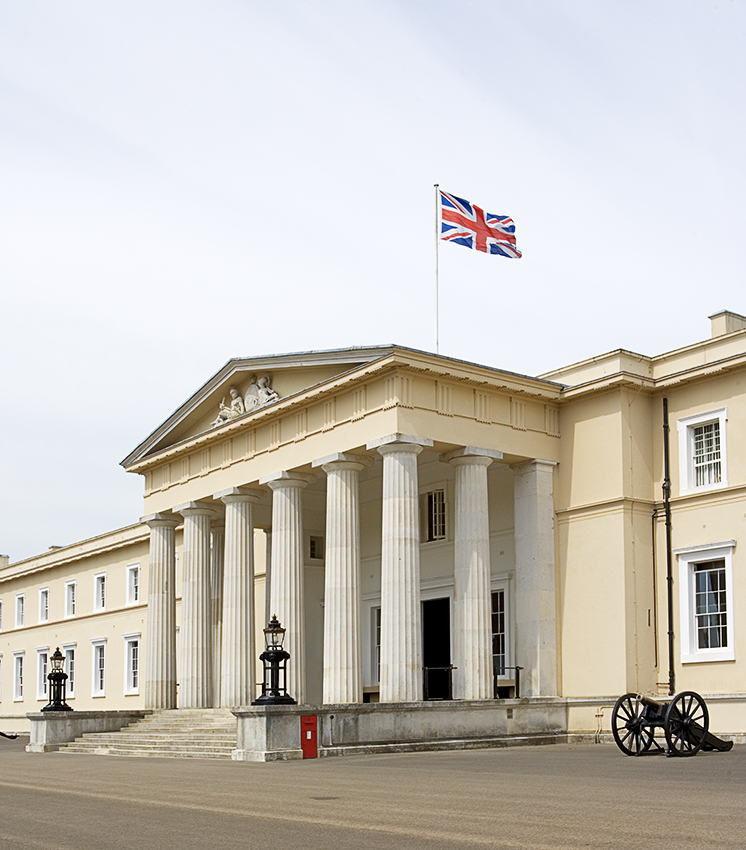
Old College building at Sandhurst

Pre-dating the college, the Royal Military Academy, Woolwich, had been established in 1741 to train artillery and engineer officers, but there was no such provision for training infantry and cavalry officers.

The Royal Military College was conceived by Colonel John Le Marchant, whose scheme for establishing schools for the military instruction of officers at High Wycombe and Great Marlow first met strong resistance on the grounds of cost.

There were already some small private military academies for aspiring infantry and cavalry officers in existence, notably one which had been operated at Chelsea by Lewis Lochée from about 1770 until he closed his 'Royal Military Academy' in 1790, but none of them had any formal approval from the British government.

In 1799, Le Marchant established a school for staff officers at High Wycombe. In 1801, Parliament voted a grant of £30,000 for his more ambitious proposals, and in 1801 the school for staff officers at High Wycombe became the Senior Department of the new Military College. In 1802, having been appointed as the first Lieutenant Governor of the College, Le Marchant opened its Junior Department at a large house called Remnantz in West Street, Great Marlow, to train gentleman cadets for the infantry and cavalry regiments of the British Army and for the presidency armies of British India. 1802 was the same year as the founding of the French Army's Saint-Cyr and of West Point in the United States. General Sir William Harcourt was appointed as the first Governor of the Royal Military College at Great Marlow and continued in post until 1811.

In January 1809, the East India Company established its own East India Military Seminary at Addiscombe to train officers for its armies.

In 1812, the College's Junior Department moved from Great Marlow into purpose-built buildings at Sandhurst designed by James Wyatt, and was soon joined there by the Senior Department, migrating from High Wycombe. In 1858 this became a separate institution, the Staff College.

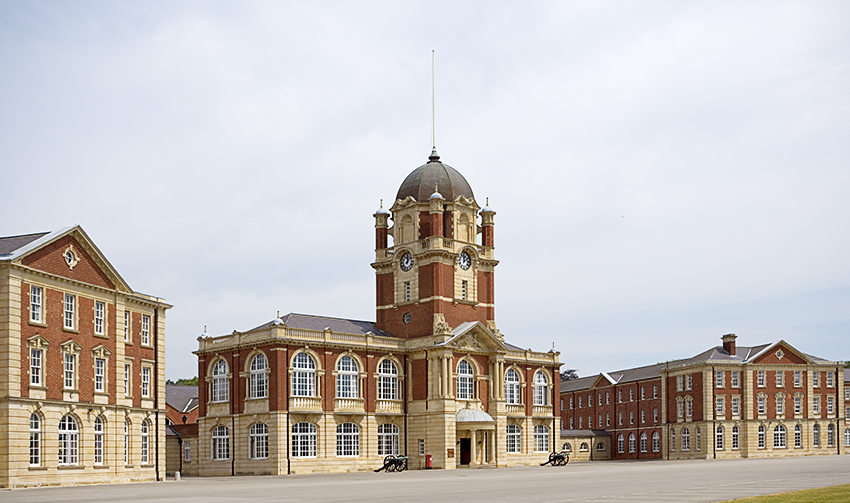
The New College Buildings

On the outbreak of the Second World War, many of the cadets and staff of the Royal Military College were mobilised for active service, but the buildings at Sandhurst remained the home of the RMC's 161 Infantry Officer Cadet Training Unit. In 1942, this unit moved to Mons Barracks, Aldershot, and for the rest of the war the Sandhurst campus was used as a Royal Armoured Corps Officer Cadet Training Unit.

In 1947, a new Royal Military Academy Sandhurst was formed on the site of the Royal Military College, merging the Royal Military Academy, Woolwich (which had trained officers for the Royal Artillery and Royal Engineers from 1741 to 1939) and the Royal Military College (1802 to 1942), with the objective of providing officer training for all arms and services.

== Governors and commandants ==
The Royal Military College was originally led by a governor, who was a figurehead, often non-resident, a lieutenant governor, who had actual day-to-day command of the college, and a commandant, who was the officer in charge of the cadets. In 1812, the posts of Lieutenant Governor and Commandant were merged into the role of Commandant. In 1888 the two remaining senior posts, the Governor and the Commandant, were merged into the single appointment of Governor and Commandant, which in 1902 was retitled as "Commandant".

== Notable cadets ==
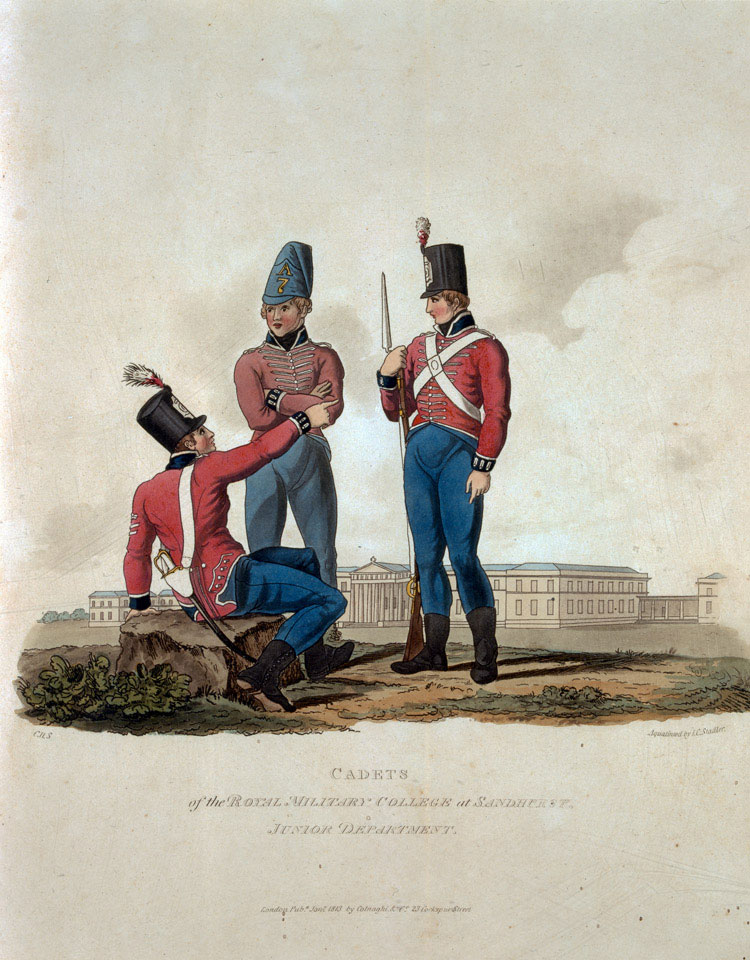
Engraving of RMC cadets, 1812

The most notable cadets of RMC Sandhurst include:

- Sir William Denison (1825–1826), Governor of New South Wales
- Field Marshal Prince Edward of Saxe-Weimar (1840–1841)
- Field Marshal Frederick Roberts, 1st Earl Roberts (1850–1851)
- Frederick Stanley, 16th Earl of Derby (1861–1862), Governor General of Canada
- King Alfonso XII of Spain (1876)
- Field Marshal Herbert Plumer, 1st Viscount Plumer (1875–1876)
- John Hope, 1st Marquess of Linlithgow (1878–1879), Governor-General of Australia
- Ronald Munro Ferguson, 1st Viscount Novar (1879–1880), Governor-General of Australia
- Field Marshal Viscount Allenby (1881–1882)
- Sir Eric John Eagles Swayne (1882), Governor of British Honduras
- Sir Charles Fergusson, 7th Baronet (1882–1883), Governor-General of New Zealand
- Field Marshal Earl Haig (1884–1885)
- Sir Winston Churchill (1894)
- Prince Alexander of Teck (1894), later the Earl of Athlone, Governor-General of the Union of South Africa and Governor General of Canada
- Field Marshal Earl Wavell (1900–1901), Viceroy of India
- Field Marshal Viscount Montgomery of Alamein (1903–1904)
- Sir Oswald Mosley, 6th Baronet (1914), Chancellor of the Duchy of Lancaster
- Field Marshal Kodandera Madappa Cariappa (1918–1919), First native-Indian full General of the Indian Army
- Field Marshal Prince Henry, Duke of Gloucester (1919), Governor General of Australia
- General Maharaj Shri Rajendrasinhji Jadeja (1920–1921), second Indian Commander in Chief of Indian Army
- Thakur Nathu Singh Rathore (1921–1922), Lieutenant General, Indian Army
- Field Marshal Ayub Khan (1926–1927), President of Pakistan
- Lieutenant General Azam Khan (1928), Governor of East Pakistan
- Major General Iftikhar Khan (1928), Pakistani general, killed in an aviation accident in 1949.
- Major General Iskandar Mirza, President of Pakistan
- Ian Fleming (1927), author, creator of James Bond
- David Niven (1930), actor, novelist
- Mohammad Usman (1932–1934), Brigadier, Indian Army, "Lion of Naushera"
