= John Whitelocke =

British Army officer and colonial administrator (1757–1833)

Lieutenant-General John Whitelocke
- 1808 portrait
- Born: 1757
- Died: 23 October 1833 (aged 75–76); Hall Barn Park, Beaconsfield, Buckinghamshire
- Burial place: Bristol Cathedral
- Military career
- Allegiance: Great Britain; United Kingdom
- Branch: British Army
- Service years: 1778–1808
- Rank: Lieutenant-general
- Conflicts: British invasions of the Río de la Plata

Lieutenant-General John Whitelocke (1757 – 23 October 1833) was a British Army officer and colonial administrator. He is known for leading the failed invasion of Buenos Aires and the forfeit of Montevideo to the Spanish by way of treaty.

== Military career ==
Educated at Marlborough Grammar School and at Lewis Lochée's military academy in Chelsea, Whitelocke entered the army in 1778 and served in Jamaica and in San Domingo. He was appointed Lieutenant-Governor of Portsmouth and General Officer Commanding South-West District on 25 June 1799, commanding the garrison during the height of invasion scares in Britain. On 10 November 1804 he was made a lieutenant-general and inspector-general of recruiting, during a period of significant expansion of the British Army.

In 1807 Whitelocke was appointed to command an expedition to seize Buenos Aires from the Spanish Empire, which was in disarray due to events in Europe. The attack failed and the British surrendered after suffering "the lamentable loss of a great proportion of the gallant army engaged in it." Whitelocke undertook negotiations with the opposing general, Santiago de Liniers, and having decided that the British position was untenable, signed the surrender and ordered the British forces to abandon Montevideo and return home later that year.

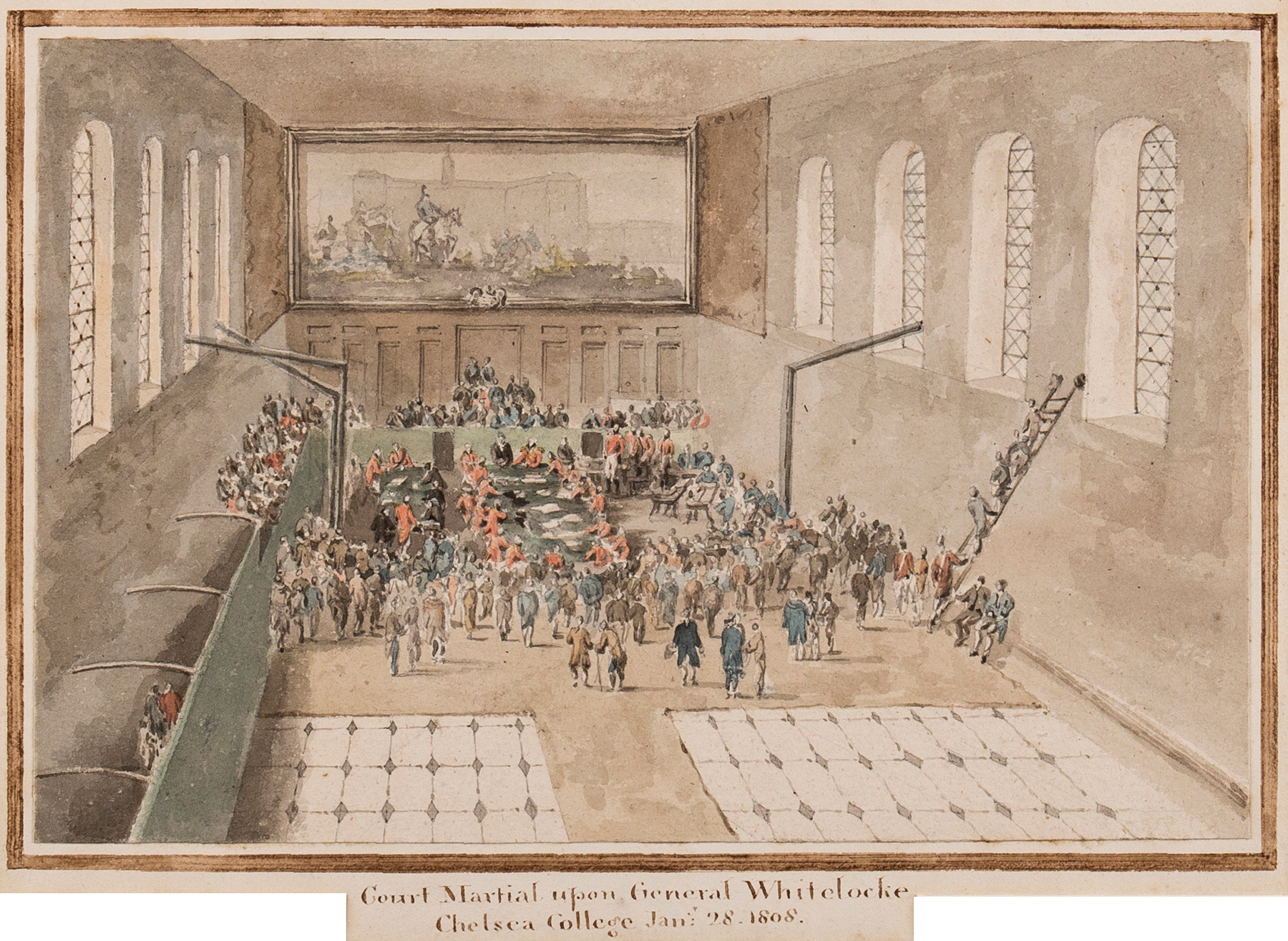
Court Martial upon General Whitelocke Chelsea College, Jan.28th 1808: a contemporary illustration by an anonymous hand

This proceeding was regarded with great disfavour by many under his command and the British Army and public, and its author was brought before a court-martial convened at The Royal Hospital in London in 1808. On all the charges, except one, he was found guilty and he was dismissed from the service , being found 'totally unfit and unworthy to serve His Majesty in any military capacity whatever.' He lived in retirement until his death at Hall Barn Park, Beaconsfield, Buckinghamshire on 23 October 1833.

== Notes ==
Military offices
Preceded by Thomas Murray	GOC South-West District; 1799–1804	Succeeded by Hildebrand Oakes
